= 2017 United Bowl =

| Arizona Rattlers | Sioux Falls Storm |
| (12–4) | (14–2) |
| Intense | United |
| 50 | 41 |
| Head coach: Kevin Guy | Head coach: Kurtiss Riggs |
| | 1 | 2 | 3 | 4 | Total |
|---|---|---|---|---|---|
| Arizona | 14 | 20 | 0 | 16 | 50 |
| Sioux Falls | 7 | 0 | 21 | 13 | 41 |
- Date: July 8, 2017
- Stadium: Denny Sanford Premier Center
- Location: Sioux Falls, South Dakota, U.S.
- MVP: Arizona LB Justin Shirk

United States TV coverage
- Network: YouTube
- Announcers: Kevin Ray and Dale Hellstrae (Rattlers); Rich Roste (Storm)

The 2017 United Bowl was the championship game of the 2017 Indoor Football League season. It was played between the Intense Conference Champion Arizona Rattlers and the United Conference Champion Sioux Falls Storm. The game was played at Denny Sanford Premier Center in Sioux Falls, South Dakota. The Rattlers won the game by a score of 50–41.

This was the Sioux Falls Storm's seventh consecutive United Bowl appearance and first loss, snapping a 6-game championship streak. It was the Arizona Rattlers' first United Bowl appearance in their first season in the IFL after joining from the Arena Football League.

== Venue ==
The game was played at Denny Sanford Premier Center in Sioux Falls, South Dakota, as the Sioux Falls Storm had the home field advantage by cause of having a better regular season record.

== Background ==
=== Arizona Rattlers ===
On October 17, 2016, the Arizona Rattlers announced their move to the IFL from the Arena Football League. They started on a 2-game losing streak heading into their first bye week before defeating the Colorado Crush at home 71–29. The Rattlers finished the season with a conference best 12–4, including a season-ending 8 game win streak, earning the first seed in the Intense Conference. In the Intense Conference championship, they defeated the Nebraska Danger at home by a score of 62–36.

2017 Intense Conference
| | W | L | T | PCT | PF | PA | CON | GB | STK |
|---|---|---|---|---|---|---|---|---|---|
| y - Arizona Rattlers | 12 | 4 | 0 | .750 | 782 | 610 | 8–1 | — | W8 |
| x - Nebraska Danger | 9 | 7 | 0 | .563 | 717 | 660 | 5–2 | 3.0 | W1 |
| Spokane Empire | 8 | 8 | 0 | .500 | 654 | 677 | 7–5 | 4.0 | L3 |
| Salt Lake Screaming Eagles | 5 | 11 | 0 | .313 | 675 | 762 | 4–8 | 7.0 | W1 |
| Colorado Crush | 3 | 13 | 0 | .188 | 629 | 821 | 2–10 | 8.0 | L4 |

=== Sioux Falls Storm ===
In 2017, the Storm began the regular season with 8 straight wins, including a 40–29 victory over the Arizona Rattlers in week 1, before a 44–36 loss to the Wichita Falls Nighthawks. They finished the season with a 14–2 record, earning the top seed in the United Conference and the best record in the league, which they secured with a 45–24 victory over the Iowa Barnstormers in week 18. In the United Conference championship, they were victorious in their rematch against the Barnstormers by a score of 66–32.

2017 United Conference
| | W | L | T | PCT | PF | PA | CON | GB | STK |
|---|---|---|---|---|---|---|---|---|---|
| y - Sioux Falls Storm | 14 | 2 | 0 | .875 | 769 | 467 | 9–2 | — | W3 |
| x - Iowa Barnstormers | 13 | 3 | 0 | .813 | 702 | 580 | 8–3 | 1.0 | L1 |
| Wichita Falls Nighthawks | 12 | 4 | 0 | .750 | 832 | 745 | 6–2 | 2.0 | L1 |
| Green Bay Blizzard | 3 | 13 | 0 | .188 | 513 | 665 | 2–9 | 11.5 | W1 |
| Cedar Rapids Titans | 1 | 15 | 0 | .063 | 494 | 780 | 1–10 | 13.0 | L10 |

== Box score ==
| Quarter | 1 | 2 | 3 | 4 | Total |
|---|---|---|---|---|---|
| Rattlers (I1) | 14 | 20 | 0 | 16 | 50 |
| Storm (U1) | 7 | 0 | 21 | 13 | 41 |

at Denny Sanford Premier Center, Sioux Falls, South Dakota

- Date: July 8, 2017
- Game time: 5:05 p.m. CDT

Scoring summary

| Quarter | Time | Drive | | | Team | Scoring information | Score | |
| Quarter | Time | Plays | Yards | TOP | Team | Scoring information | ARI | SFX |
|---|---|---|---|---|---|---|---|---|
| 1 | 12:21 | 4 | 28 | 2:36 | ARI | Monroe 2-yard touchdown run, Petre kick good | 7 | 0 |
| 1 | 11:31 | — | — | — | SFX | Williams 50-yard kickoff return TD, Syrovatka kick good | 7 | 7 |
| 1 | 09:33 | 2 | 42 | 1:06 | ARI | Miles 34-yard touchdown reception from Sokol, Petre kick good | 14 | 7 |
| 2 | 14:57 | 7 | 25 | 5:10 | ARI | Monroe 2-yard touchdown run, Petre kick no good | 20 | 7 |
| 2 | 02:45 | — | — | — | ARI | Fumble recovery returned 29 yards for touchdown by Gordon, Petre kick good | 27 | 7 |
| 2 | 00:14 | 1 | 5 | 0:20 | ARI | Amos 5-yard touchdown reception from Sokol, Petre kick good | 34 | 7 |
| 3 | 12:31 | 4 | 30 | 2:26 | SFX | Harold 17-yard touchdown reception from Brown, Syrovatka kick good | 34 | 14 |
| 3 | 08:09 | 4 | 15 | 2:38 | SFX | Rouse 7-yard touchdown run, Syrovatka kick good | 34 | 21 |
| 3 | 05:40 | — | — | — | SFX | Interception returned 2 yards for touchdown by Peguese, Syrovatka kick good | 34 | 28 |
| 4 | 13:54 | 2 | 9 | 1:03 | ARI | Monroe 7-yard touchdown run, Petre kick good | 41 | 28 |
| 4 | 08:59 | 6 | 10 | 3:21 | ARI | 19-yard field goal by Petre | 44 | 28 |
| 4 | 05:25 | 7 | 47 | 3:31 | SFX | Harold 5-yard touchdown reception from Brown, 2-point run failed | 44 | 34 |
| 4 | 02:36 | 6 | 29 | 2:44 | ARI | 23-yard field goal by Petre | 47 | 34 |
| 4 | 02:05 | 1 | 40 | 0:26 | SFX | Tatum 40-yard touchdown reception from Brown, Syrovatka kick good | 47 | 41 |
| 4 | 00:47 | 4 | -1 | 0:42 | ARI | 28-yard field goal by Petre | 50 | 41 |
| "TOP" = time of possession. For other American football terms, see Glossary of American football. | | | | | | | ARI | SFX |
