= 2017 Spokane Empire season =

Indoor Football League team season

- Owner: IFL Partners, LLC (Nader Naini, Managing Owner)
- General manager: Ryan Eucker
- Head coach: Adam Shackleford
- Home stadium: Spokane Veterans Memorial Arena

Results
- Record: 8–8
- Conference place: 3rd
- Playoffs: Did not qualify

The 2017 Spokane Empire season was the second season for the professional indoor football franchise in the Indoor Football League (IFL). The Empire were one of ten teams that competed in the IFL for the 2017 season and were members of the Intense Conference.

Led by head coach Adam Shackleford, the Empire played their home games at Spokane Veterans Memorial Arena in Spokane, Washington. After the season, the team ceased operations.

== Roster changes ==
=== Free agents ===
Position	Player	2016 team	Notes
QB	Aaron Aiken	Arizona Rattlers	Signed with the Rattlers on November 1, 2016
WR	Diondre Borel	Arizona Rattlers	Signed with the Rattlers on October 27, 2016
DL	Brett Bowers	Spokane Empire	Re-signed on October 4, 2016, released February 20, 2017
OL	Michael Boyefio	TBD	
DB	Robert Brown	Spokane Empire	Re-signed on August 22, 2016
WR	Samuel Charles	Spokane Empire	Re-signed on August 23
K	Patrick Clarke	Beijing Lions	Drafted in the 18th round of the China Arena Football League
QB	Charles Dowdell	Spokane Empire	Re-signed on August 23
DB	Josh Ferguson	TBD	
OL	Kyle Fischer	Spokane Empire	Re-signed on September 1, 2016
LB	Nick Haag	Spokane Empire	Re-signed on October 18, 2016
WR	J. J. Hayes	Spokane Empire	Re-signed on August 23
WR	Justin Helwege	Spokane Empire	
OL	Brandon Haskins	TBD	
DL	Toby Jackson	Spokane Empire	Re-signed on October 18, 2016
DB	Adrian James	Spokane Empire	Re-signed on September 10, 2016
RB	Trevor Kennedy	Spokane Empire	Re-signed on February 7, 2017
OL	Dave Lefotu	Spokane Empire	Re-signed on September 10, 2016
DL	C. J. Olaniyan	TBD	
DL	Ben Perry	TBD	
RB	Antonio Pierce	TBD	
DL	Michael Reynolds	Spokane Empire	Re-signed on August 12, released February February 21, 2017
DB	Tyree Robinson	Spokane Empire	Re-signed on August 22
DL	Donte Rumph	TBD	
DB	Cassius Sendish	TBD	
WR	Carl Sims	Spokane Empire	Re-signed on February 16, 2017
OL	Mike Trice	TBD	
LB	Pasquale Vacchio	Spokane Empire	Re-signed on January 17, 2017
DB	Lorenzo White	Spokane Empire	Re-signed on October 11, 2016, released February February 21, 2017

=== Signings ===
Position	Player	2016 Team	Notes
OL	Sedrick Flowers	Rookie	Signed August 12, 2016, released February 20, 2017
OL	Darren Pinnock	Rookie	Signed August 12, 2016
QB	Austin Trainor	None	Signed August 12, 2016, released February 20, 2017
DL	Rika Levi	Rookie	Signed August 13, 2016, released February 20, 2017
OL	Jonah Austin	Rookie	Signed August 22, 2016
OL	Larry Mazyck	Rookie	Signed August 23, 2016, released February 16, 2017
DB	John Hardy-Tuliau	None	Signed August 23, 2016
WR	Orlandus Harris	Bloomington Edge	Signed August 30, 2016
LB	Andrew Jackson	None	Signed August 30, 2016
WR	Thomas Shuler	None	Signed August 30, 2016, released February 16, 2017
RB	Rob Brown	Tri-Cities Fever	Signed September 10, 2016, released February 21, 2017
RB	Mulku Kalokoh	None	Signed September 10, 2016
WR	Dejuan Miller	Tri-Cities Fever	Signed September 10, 2016
OL	Siosifa Tufunga	Rookie	Signed September 22, 2016
OL	James Atoe	Colorado Crush	Signed October 4, 2016
DL	Royce LaFrance	None	Signed October 11, 2016
DB	Norris Wrenn III	Billings Wolves	Signed October 11, 2016, released February February 21, 2017
DL	Pat McNeil	Rookie	Signed October 15, 2016, released February 16, 2017
QB	Aaron Wilmer	Rookie	Signed October 15, 2016
OL	Bill Vavau	Colorado Crush	Signed October 24, 2016
OL	Deveric Gallington	Portland Steel	Signed November 1, 2016
DB	Stephen Godbolt	Tri-Cities Fever	Signed November 1, 2016, released February February 21, 2017
DL	O. J. Mau	None	Signed November 11, 2016
WR	Lamont Bryant	None	Signed January 24, 2017, released February February 20, 2017
OL	Cassidy Curtis	None	Signed January 24, 2017, released February February 21, 2017
DL	Junior Alexis	Rookie	Signed February 7, 2017
OL	Mikingson Marsaille	Rookie	Signed February 7, 2017, released February 16, 2017
WR	Devonn Brown	Rookie	Signed February 8, 2017
DL	J. D. Griggs	Colorado Crush	Signed February 9, 2017
DB	Malcolm Griggs	Rookie	Signed February 7, 2017, released February 16, 2017
DL	Harold Love III	Dodge City Law	Signed February 16, 2017
WR	Bryan Pray	Iowa Barnstormers	Signed February 16, 2017
K	Craig Peterson	Tampa Bay Storm	Signed February 21, 2017

Indicates that the player was a free agent at the end of his respective team's 2016 season.

== Staff ==
2017 Spokane Empire staff
Front office: Majority owner – IFL Partners, LLC; General manager – Ryan Eucker; Director of sponsorship sales – Suzie Dunn; Director of game operations – Karen Kiehl; Director of community relations – Crystal Medina; Director of ticket sales – Chris Combo; Group tickets coordinator – Hannah Holman; Corporate account executive – Jake Martin; Account executive – Ryan Hagel	Coaches: Head coach – Adam Shackleford; Assistant head coach – Cleveland Pratt; Other assistant coaches: Anthony Payton; Marquise Liverpool; Marshall Hart

== Schedule ==
Key: Win Tie Loss Bye

=== Regular season ===
All start times are local time

Week	Day	Date	Kickoff	Opponent	Results		Location	Attendance
Week	Day	Date	Kickoff	Opponent	Score	Record	Location	Attendance
1	BYE							
2	Thursday	February 23	7:00pm	Green Bay Blizzard	W 34–31	1–0	Spokane Veterans Memorial Arena	
3	Friday	March 3	5:05pm	at Wichita Falls Nighthawks	L 56–57 (2OT)	1–1	Kay Yeager Coliseum	
4	Monday	March 13	6:00pm	at Salt Lake Screaming Eagles	W 41–35	2–1	Maverik Center	4,196
5	Friday	March 17	5:00pm	at Colorado Crush	W 70–37	3–1	Budweiser Events Center	
6	Friday	March 24	7:00pm	Salt Lake Screaming Eagles	W 53–36	4–1	Spokane Veterans Memorial Arena	
7	Saturday	April 1	7:00pm	Nebraska Danger	L 36–42	4–2	Spokane Veterans Memorial Arena	
8	BYE							
9	Friday	April 14	7:00pm	Colorado Crush	W 36–24	5–2	Spokane Veterans Memorial Arena	
10	Saturday	April 22	7:00pm	at Arizona Rattlers	W 60–51	6–2	Talking Stick Resort Arena	12,725
11	Sunday	April 30	3:00pm	Salt Lake Screaming Eagles	W 31–29	7–2	Spokane Veterans Memorial Arena	
12	Saturday	May 6	5:05pm	at Sioux Falls Storm	L 32–62	7–3	Denny Sanford Premier Center	
13	Friday	May 12	7:00pm	Arizona Rattlers	L 35–49	7–4	Spokane Veterans Memorial Arena	
14	Thursday	May 18	5:00pm	at Colorado Crush	L 36–45	7–5	Budweiser Events Center	
15	Friday	May 26	7:00pm	Colorado Crush	W 48–43	8–5	Spokane Veterans Memorial Arena	
16	Saturday	June 3	7:00pm	Arizona Rattlers	L 16–33	8–6	Spokane Veterans Memorial Arena	
17	Friday	June 9	5:05pm	at Iowa Barnstormers	L 28–58	8–7	Wells Fargo Arena	7,153
18	Friday	June 16	6:00pm	at Salt Lake Screaming Eagles	L 42–45	8–8	Maverik Center	4,581

==== Standings ====
2017 Intense Conference
	W	L	T	PCT	PF	PA	CON	GB	STK
y - Arizona Rattlers	12	4	0	.750	782	610	8–1	—	W8
x - Nebraska Danger	9	7	0	.563	717	660	5–2	3.0	W1
Spokane Empire	8	8	0	.500	654	677	7–5	4.0	L3
Salt Lake Screaming Eagles	5	11	0	.313	675	762	4–8	7.0	W1
Colorado Crush	3	13	0	.188	629	821	2–10	8.0	L4

== Roster ==
2017 Spokane Empire roster
Quarterbacks: 3 Marcus McDade; 16 Aaron Wilmer; Running backs: 18 Trevor Kennedy; 30 Andrew Pierce; Wide receivers: 10 Devonn Brown; 6 Rashaad Carter; 1 Samuel Charles; 2 Orlandus Harris; 2 Bryan Pray	Offensive linemen: 70 Jonah Austin; 66 Deveric Gallington; 57 Dante Moses; 74 Darren Pinnock; 55 Bill Vavau; Defensive linemen: 12 Kaelin Burnett; 93 J. D. Griggs; 95 Terrance Woodard	Linebackers: 47 Nick Haag; 8 Andrew Jackson; 7 Joseph Thornton; 13 Pasquale Vacchio; Defensive backs: 20 Qua Cox; 33 John Hardy-Tuliau; 21 Antoine Tharpe; Special teams: 19 Craig Peterson	Reserve lists: 60 James Atoe OL (Exempt); 79 Cassidy Curtis OL (Exempt); 72 Kyle Fischer; 80 J. J. Hayes WR (DNR); 12 Toby Jackson DL (DNR); 22 Adrian James DB (Exempt); 48 Royce LaFrance DL (Exempt); 56 Dave Lefotu OL (Exempt); 91 O. J. Mau DL (IR/DFR); 5 Tyree Robinson DB (IR); rookies in italics Roster updated June 14, 2017; 26 Active, 10 Inactive
