= 2017 Colorado Crush season =

Indoor Football League team season

- Owner: Project FANchise
- Head coach: Jose Jefferson (weeks 1-10); Marvin Jones (interim)
- Home stadium: Budweiser Events Center

Results
- Record: 3–13
- Conference place: 5th
- Playoffs: Did not qualify

The 2017 Colorado Crush season was the eleventh season for the professional indoor football franchise and ninth in the Indoor Football League (IFL). It was the second season of the franchise being labeled the Crush after playing nine seasons under the Ice moniker. The Crush were one of ten teams that competed in the IFL for the 2017 season. The Crush were members of the Intense Conference.

Led by first-year head coach Jose Jefferson for the first ten weeks and then interim head coach Marvin Jones, the Crush played their home games at the Budweiser Events Center in Loveland, Colorado.

On October 19, 2016, it was announced that Project FANchise had purchased the Crush.

== Roster changes ==
=== Free agents ===
| Position | Player | 2017 team | Notes |
|---|---|---|---|
| RB | Breon Allen | Salt Lake Screaming Eagles | Signed with the Screaming Eagles on November 7, 2016 |
| OL | James Atoe | Spokane Empire | Signed with the Empire on October 4, 2016 |
| DL | Derrick Billups | TBD | |
| DB | Dominique Bridges | TBD | |
| DL | Braylon Broughton | TBD | |
| DB | Louis Covington | TBD | |
| DL | Tevin Davis | Wichita Force | Signed with the Force on December 14, 2016 |
| DB | Darnell Evans | TBD | |
| QB | Damien Fleming | Colorado Crush | Re-signed November 11, 2016, released on January 4, 2017. |
| RB | Josh Ford | Colorado Crush | Re-signed on October 21, 2016 |
| LB | Nai Fotu | TBD | |
| DB | Evan Frierson | TBD | |
| DL | David Gilbert | Colorado Crush | Re-signed on December 1, 2016, released February 16, 2017 |
| DL | J. D. Griggs | Spokane Empire | Signed with Empire on February 9, 2017 |
| OL | Michael Howell | TBD | |
| K | Spencer Groner | Colorado Crush | Re-signed February 16, 2017 |
| LB | Austin Jacques | TBD | |
| LB | Jake Johnson | TBD | |
| WR | Jermaine Jones | TBD | |
| WR | Kyle Kaiser | Colorado Crush | Re-signed on November 11, 2016 |
| OL | Kenneth Maryon | Colorado Crush | Re-signed on December 1, 2016 |
| DB | Daniel Masifilo | Colorado Crush | Re-signed on October 21, 2016, released on February 16, 2017 |
| OL | Kamalie Matthews | Washington Valor | Assigned to the Valor on February 1, 2017 |
| WR | Jerome McGee | TBD | |
| DB | Carl Miles Jr. | TBD | |
| QB | Brandon Mitchell | TBD | |
| OL | Dante Moses | Jacksonville Sharks | Signed with the Sharks on February 11, 2017 |
| DB | Quinton Richardson | TBD | |
| DB | Corey Sample | TBD | |
| DB | L. J. Stroman | TBD | |
| OL | Scott Stuller | TBD | |
| OL | Bill Vavau | Spokane Empire | Signed with the Empire on October 24, 2016 |
| WR | Demarius Washington | Arizona Rattlers | Signed with the Rattlers on October 28, 2016 |
| WR | Alex Wheat | Salt Lake Screaming Eagles | Signed with the Screaming Eagles on October 18, 2016 |
| WR | Doug Williams | TBD | |
| DL | Khalid Wilson | TBD | |
| DL | Armonti Yharbrough | Corpus Christi Rage | Signed with the Rage on December 15, 2016 |

=== Signings ===
| Position | Player | 2016 team | Notes |
|---|---|---|---|
| WR | Anthony Eboreime | Iowa Barnstormers | Signed on November 11, 2016, released February 10, 2017 |
| DB | Terry Johnson | None | Signed on November 11, 2016 |
| RB | Jordan James | None | Signed on November 11, 2016, released February 16, 2017 |
| QB | Jonathan Bane | Tampa Bay Storm | Signed on November 14, 2016, released January 30, 2017 |
| WR | William Dukes | Spokane Empire | Signed on November 14, 2016, released on December 13, 2016 |
| OL | Forrestal Hickman | Montreal Alouettes | Signed on November 14, 2016 |
| LB | Donte Savage | None | Signed on November 14, 2016 |
| DL | Kwame Bell | None | Signed on November 17, 2016 |
| DB | Majique Key | None | Signed on November 17, 2016, released February 16, 2017 |
| DL | Jamil Merrell | Los Angeles KISS | Signed on November 17, 2016 |
| OL | Raphael Smiley | None | Signed on November 17, 2016, released February 10, 2017 |
| RB | Jonathan Wallace | None | Signed on November 17, 2016, released on February 6, 2017 |
| OL | Cedric Brittnum | None | Signed on November 22, 2016, released February 16, 2017 |
| OL | Joe Kaleta | None | Signed on November 22, 2016, released March 8, 2017 |
| DB | Antonio Marshall | Bloomington Edge | Signed on November 22, 2016 |
| DB | Derrick Morgan | Iowa Barnstormers | Signed on November 22, 2016 |
| LB | Ace Clark | Spokane Empire | Signed on November 29, 2016 |
| WR | Chris Gant | Iowa Barnstormers | Signed on November 29, 2016 |
| DL | V. J. Holmes | None | Signed on November 29, 2016, released March 8, 2017 |
| WR | Marquis Cushion | Iowa Barnstormers | Signed on December 13, 2016, released on January 30, 2017 |
| WR | Jarrett Davis | None | Signed on December 13, 2016, released on January 17, 2017 |
| WR | Tim Lukas | Florida Tarpons | Signed on December 13, 2016 |
| LB | Marquiz Edget | None | Signed on January 3, 2017, released on February 6, 2017 |
| WR | Nick Jones | None | Signed on January 3, 2017, released on February 7, 2017 |
| QB | Sean Goldrich | None | Signed on January 4, 2017, |
| DB | Cardelro Jones | Wichita Falls Nighthawks | Signed on January 4, 2017, |
| DL | Malcolm Goines | Wichita Falls Nighthawks | Signed on January 17, 2017, released on February 21, 2017 |
| WR | Jack Spady | None | Signed on January 17, 2017, released on February 6, 2017 |
| RB | Paris Cotton | Calgary Stampeders | Signed on January 20, 2017, |
| DL | Phillip Dukes | None | Signed on January 20, 2017, released on January 30, 2017 |
| DB | ShaRon Irwin | None | Signed on January 20, 2017, released on February 6, 2017 |
| DB | James Stanfield | None | Signed on January 20, 2017, released on February 6, 2017 |
| QB | Aaron Aiken | Spokane Empire | Signed on January 26, 2017, |
| WR | Nnamdi Agude | None | Signed on January 26, 2017, |
| DL | Jonathan Powell | None | Signed on January 30, 2017, released on February 6, 2017 |
| WR | Donte Moore | None | Signed on February 7, 2017, released February 10, 2017 |
| DB | Vincent Taylor | Billings Wolves | Signed on February 10, 2017, released February 16, 2017 |
| LB | Azziz Higgins | None | Signed on February 20, 2017 |
| OL | Chad Kolumber | Iowa Barnstormers | Signed on February 20, 2017 |
| DB | Daniel Lindsey | None | Signed on February 20, 2017 |
| DL | Philip Lewis | Iowa Barnstormers | Signed on February 21, 2017 |
| DL | Tevin Hood | None | Signed on March 8, 2017 |
| DL | Terrance Surratt | Iowa Barnstormers | Signed on March 8, 2017 |
| WR | Love Rose III | None | Signed on March 8, 2017 |
| LB | Mikell Mair | Florida Tarpons | Signed on March 9, 2017 |
| WR | Marquis Avery | None | Signed on March 15, 2017 |
| WR | Erick Brundidge | Sioux Falls Storm | Signed on March 15, 2017 |

| Indicates that the player was a free agent at the end of his respective team's 2016 season. |

=== Trades ===
- October 14: The Crush acquired defensive back Deante' Purvis in a trade that sent defensive back Rashard Smith to the Wichita Falls Nighthawks.
- February 13: The Crush acquired offensive lineman Sean Brown in a trade that sent future considerations to the Green Bay Blizzard.

== Staff ==
2017 Colorado Crush staff
| Front office: Principal owner – Project FANchise; General manager – vacant; Director of operations – Aaron Ontiveros; Account Representative - George Martinez; Director of group sales – Nick Rezvani; Business Operations, Sales Representative - Josh Swado; Public Relations, Sales Representative - Breanne Jackson | Head coach: Interim head coach – Marvin Jones; Offensive coaches: Offensive Coordinator -; Wide Receivers - Tristan Johnson; Defensive coaches: Defensive coordinator – Marvin Jones; Special Team coaches: Special teams coordinator – |

== Schedule ==
Key: Win Tie Loss Bye

=== Regular season ===
All start times are local time

| Week | Day | Date | Kickoff | Opponent | Results | | Location | Attendance |
| Week | Day | Date | Kickoff | Opponent | Score | Record | Location | Attendance |
|---|---|---|---|---|---|---|---|---|
| 1 | BYE | | | | | | | |
| 2 | Sunday | February 26 | 3:00pm | Salt Lake Screaming Eagles | L 41–42 (OT) | 0–1 | Budweiser Events Center | |
| 3 | Sunday | March 5 | 3:00pm | Nebraska Danger | L 36–54 | 0–2 | Budweiser Events Center | |
| 4 | Saturday | March 11 | 7:00pm | at Arizona Rattlers | L 27–71 | 0–3 | Talking Stick Resort Arena | 14,962 |
| 5 | Friday | March 17 | 6:00pm | Spokane Empire | L 37–70 | 0–4 | Budweiser Events Center | |
| 6 | Saturday | March 25 | 7:05pm | at Nebraska Danger | L 23–55 | 0–5 | Eihusen Arena | |
| 7 | Friday | March 31 | 7:00pm | at Salt Lake Screaming Eagles | W 52–49 | 1–5 | Maverik Center | 4,121 |
| 8 | BYE | | | | | | | |
| 9 | Friday | April 14 | 8:00pm | at Spokane Empire | L 24–36 | 1–6 | Spokane Veterans Memorial Arena | |
| 10 | Friday | April 21 | 6:00pm | Wichita Falls Nighthawks | W 77–73 | 2–6 | Budweiser Events Center | |
| 11 | Saturday | April 29 | 7:05pm | at Iowa Barnstormers | L 21–33 | 2–7 | Wells Fargo Arena | 6,942 |
| 12 | Sunday | May 7 | 4:30pm | Salt Lake Screaming Eagles | L 41–64 | 2–8 | Budweiser Events Center | |
| 13 | Friday | May 12 | 7:00pm | at Salt Lake Screaming Eagles | L 37–38 | 2–9 | Maverik Center | 4,855 |
| 14 | Thursday | May 18 | 6:00pm | Spokane Empire | W 45–36 | 3–9 | Budweiser Events Center | |
| 15 | Friday | May 26 | 8:00pm | at Spokane Empire | L 43–48 | 3–10 | Spokane Veterans Memorial Arena | |
| 16 | Saturday | June 3 | 5:00pm | Sioux Falls Storm | L 29–51 | 3–11 | Budweiser Events Center | |
| 17 | Saturday | June 10 | 6:05pm | at Wichita Falls Nighthawks | L 52–54 | 3–12 | Kay Yeager Coliseum | |
| 18 | Friday | June 16 | 6:00pm | Arizona Rattlers | L 44–47 (OT) | 3–13 | Budweiser Events Center | |

==== Standings ====
2017 Intense Conference
| | W | L | T | PCT | PF | PA | CON | GB | STK |
|---|---|---|---|---|---|---|---|---|---|
| y - Arizona Rattlers | 12 | 4 | 0 | .750 | 782 | 610 | 8–1 | — | W8 |
| x - Nebraska Danger | 9 | 7 | 0 | .563 | 717 | 660 | 5–2 | 3.0 | W1 |
| Spokane Empire | 8 | 8 | 0 | .500 | 654 | 677 | 7–5 | 4.0 | L3 |
| Salt Lake Screaming Eagles | 5 | 11 | 0 | .313 | 675 | 762 | 4–8 | 7.0 | W1 |
| Colorado Crush | 3 | 13 | 0 | .188 | 629 | 821 | 2–10 | 8.0 | L4 |

== Roster ==
2017 Colorado Crush roster
| Quarterbacks: 5 Sean Goldrich; 16 Liam Nadler; Running backs: 13 Josh Ford; 1 Zavier Steward; Wide receivers: 12 Anthony Jones Jr.; 8 Kyle Kaiser; 4 Rose Love III; 88 Kendall Sanders | Offensive linemen: 68 Daniel Anousheh; 65 Sean Brown; 78 Forrestal Hickman; 66 Casey Perry; Defensive linemen: 59 Kwame Bell; -- Terrance Evans; 48 Tevin Hood; 99 Phillip Lewis; 95 Terrance Surratt | Linebackers: 21 Ace Clark; 10 Azziz Higgins; Defensive backs: 6 Cardelro Jones; 18 Daniel Lindsey; 7 Antonio Marshall; 2 Derrick Morgan; 25 Keith Trumps; Special teams: 32 Miles Bergner | Reserve lists: 12 Aaron Aiken QB (IR); -- Nnamdi Agude WR (IR); 3 Erick Brundidge WR (IR); 22 Paris Cotton RB (DNR); 9 Chris Gant WR (DNR); 1 Terry Johnson DB (DNR); 79 Chad Kolumber OL (IR/DFR); 66 Lance McDowdell DL (DNR); 91 Jamil Merrell DL (IR); 20 Deante Purvis DB (IR); rookies in italics Roster updated June 1, 2017; 25 Active, 10 Inactive |
