= 2017 Iowa Barnstormers season =

Indoor Football League team season

- Owner: Jeff Lamberti
- General manager: John Pettit
- Head coach: Dixie Wooten
- Home stadium: Wells Fargo Arena

Results
- Record: 13–3
- Conference place: 2nd
- Playoffs: Lost United Conference Championship Game 32–66 (Storm)

The 2017 Iowa Barnstormers season was the team's seventeenth season as a professional indoor football franchise and third in the Indoor Football League (IFL). One of ten teams that competed in the IFL for the 2017 season, the Barnstormers were members of the United Conference.

Led by first-year head coach Dixie Wooten, the Barnstormers played their home games at the Wells Fargo Arena in the Des Moines, Iowa.

== Staff ==
2017 Iowa Barnstormers staff
Front office: Principal owner – Jeff Lamberti; Owner/Vice President/COO – John Pettit; Owner – Don Lamberti; Honorary owner – Ben Silverstein; Owner – David Silverstein; Owner – Scott Thurber; Owner – Dave Knau; Owner – Jim Gocke; Owner – Dan Stanbrough; Owner – Jeff Lipman; Owner – Tom Nelson; Owner – Dan Ochylski; Owner – Brian Chittenden	Head coach - Dixie Wooten Offensive coaches: Assistant head coach / offensive line coach – Michael Custer; Defensive coaches: Defensive coordinator / defensive backs coach – Marcus Coleman; Defensive line coach / special teams coordinator – Malcolm Nelson; Strength & conditioning: Rodney Filer

== Schedule ==
Key: Win Tie Loss Bye

=== Pre-season ===
Week	Day	Date	Kickoff	Opponent	Results		Location
Week	Day	Date	Kickoff	Opponent	Score	Record	Location
1	Saturday	February 4	7:05pm	Cedar Rapids Titans	W 38–26	1–0	U.S. Cellular Center

=== Regular season ===
All start times are local time

Week	Day	Date	Kickoff	Opponent	Results		Location	Attendance
Week	Day	Date	Kickoff	Opponent	Score	Record	Location	Attendance
1	Saturday	February 18	7:05 PM	at Wichita Falls Nighthawks	L 53–68	0–1	Kay Yeager Coliseum	3,353
2	Sunday	February 26	5:00 PM	at Arizona Rattlers	W 51-47	1-1	Talking Stick Resort Arena	11,438
3	BYE							
4	Sunday	March 12	3:05 PM	at Green Bay Blizzard	W 49–30	2–1	Resch Center	4,409
5	Monday	March 20	6:05 PM	at Sioux Falls Storm	L 13–70	2–2	Denny Sanford Premier Center	5,246
6	Sunday	March 26	3:05 PM	Cedar Rapids Titans	W 46–23	3–2	Wells Fargo Arena	5,653
7	BYE							
8	Saturday	April 8	7:05 PM	Green Bay Blizzard	W 27–26	4–2	Wells Fargo Arena	6,028
9	Saturday	April 15	7:05 PM	Nebraska Danger	W 48–14	5–2	Wells Fargo Arena	5,683
10	Saturday	April 22	7:05 PM	at Cedar Rapids Titans	W 31–25	6–2	U.S. Cellular Center	
11	Saturday	April 29	7:05 PM	Colorado Crush	W 33–21	7–2	Wells Fargo Arena	6,942
12	Saturday	May 6	7:05 PM	at Green Bay Blizzard	W 41–34	8–2	Resch Center	
13	Saturday	May 13	7:05 PM	Cedar Rapids Titans	W 56–54	9–2	Wells Fargo Arena	7,763
14	Saturday	May 20	7:05 PM	at Wichita Falls Nighthawks	W 50–47	10–2	Kay Yeager Coliseum	
15	Friday	May 26	7:05 PM	Green Bay Blizzard	W 64–12	11–2	Wells Fargo Arena	8,377
16	Friday	June 2	8:00 PM	at Salt Lake Screaming Eagles	W 58–36	12–2	Maverik Center	3,873
17	Friday	June 9	7:05 PM	Spokane Empire	W 58–28	13–2	Wells Fargo Arena	7,153
18	Saturday	June 17	7:05 PM	Sioux Falls Storm	L 24–45	13–3	Wells Fargo Arena	8,638

==== Standings ====
2017 United Conference
	W	L	T	PCT	PF	PA	CON	GB	STK
y - Sioux Falls Storm	14	2	0	.875	769	467	9–2	—	W3
x - Iowa Barnstormers	13	3	0	.813	702	580	8–3	1.0	L1
Wichita Falls Nighthawks	12	4	0	.750	832	745	6–2	2.0	L1
Green Bay Blizzard	3	13	0	.188	513	665	2–9	11.5	W1
Cedar Rapids Titans	1	15	0	.063	494	780	1–10	13.0	L10

=== Postseason ===
Round	Day	Date	Kickoff	Opponent	Score	Location
United Conference Championship	Saturday	July 24	7:05pm	at Sioux Falls Storm	L 32–66	Denny Sanford Premier Center

== Roster ==
2017 Iowa Barnstormers roster
Quarterbacks: -- Taylor Genuser; 14 Travis Partridge; Running backs: 32 Keshaudas Spence; 20 Rasheed Williams; Wide receivers: 1 Ryan Balentine; 4 Jared Elmore; 12 Lucas Hefty; 5 DeJay Lester; 11 Brady Roland	Offensive linemen: 77 Dashawn Johnson; 75 D'Angelo McCray; 70 Jayson Palmgren; -- Tyrone Patterson; Defensive linemen: 90 Bryon Bennett; 56 B. J. Butler; 55 Keith Jones Jr.; 17 Frank Mays; 45 Ra'Shawde Myers	Linebackers: 35 Zachary Allen; 23 Javicz Jones; Defensive backs: 24 Jamie Bender; 8 Bryce Enyard; 21 Matt Goldsmith; 2 Dee Maggitt; Kickers: 3 Cody Barber	Reserve lists: -- Kody Afusia OL (Exempt); 74 Mitchell Bell OL (Exempt); -- Dasmine Cathey (DNR); 19 Kenton Chun K (IR); -- Danny Farr DL (DNR); -- Cory Johnson DL (Exempt); 3 Xavier Milton WR (DNR); 5 Quinton Pedroza WR (DNR); 71 Jeremy Schonbrunner OL (IR); 22 Damond Smith DB (Exempt); rookies in italics; Roster updated June 22, 2017; 26 Active, 10 Inactive
