= 2017 Arizona Rattlers season =

Indoor football season

- Owner: Ron Shurts
- General manager: Kevin Guy
- Head coach: Kevin Guy
- Home stadium: Talking Stick Resort Arena

Results
- Record: 12–4
- Conference place: 1st
- Playoffs: Won Intense Conference Championship 36–62 (Danger); Won 2017 United Bowl 50–41 (Storm)

The 2017 Arizona Rattlers season was the twenty-fifth season for the professional indoor football franchise and first in the Indoor Football League (IFL). The Rattlers were one of ten teams that competed in the IFL for the 2017 season, the Rattlers were members of the Intense Conference.

Led by head coach Kevin Guy, the Rattlers played their home games at Talking Stick Resort Arena in Phoenix, Arizona.

== Staff ==
2017 Arizona Rattlers staff
Front office: CEO / majority owner – Ron Shurts; General manager - Kevin Guy; President – Chris Presson; Assistant general manager - Jeff Jarnigan; Director of team operations – J. T. Thompson; Director of business operations – Ashley Stovall; Director of media / community relations – Peter Garbow; Operations assistant – Karra Labombarde; Sidewinders dancers director – Angie Baker	Head coach: Head coach – Kevin Guy; Offensive coaches: Assistant head coach – Kani Kauahi; Defensive coaches: Defensive Line Coach - Jeff Jarnigan

== Schedule ==
Key: Win Tie Loss Bye

=== Regular season ===
All start times are local time

Week	Day	Date	Kickoff	Opponent	Results		Location	Attendance
Week	Day	Date	Kickoff	Opponent	Score	Record	Location	Attendance
1	Friday	February 17	7:05pm	at Sioux Falls Storm	L 29–40	0–1	Denny Sanford Premier Center	8,963
2	Sunday	February 26	4:00 PM	Iowa Barnstormers	L 47–51	0–2	Talking Stick Resort Arena	11,438
3	BYE							
4	Saturday	March 11	6:00 PM	Colorado Crush	W 71–27	1–2	Talking Stick Resort Arena	14,962
5	BYE							
6	Sunday	March 26	3:05 PM	at Green Bay Blizzard	W 30–29	2–2	Resch Center	
7	Saturday	April 1	6:00 PM	Wichita Falls Nighthawks	L 53–60	2–3	Talking Stick Resort Arena	10,879
8	Friday	April 7	7:05 PM	at Nebraska Danger	W 39–36	3–3	Eihusen Arena	
9	Friday	April 14	7:00 PM	at Salt Lake Screaming Eagles	W 73–60	4–3	Maverik Center	3,785
10	Saturday	April 22	7:00 PM	Spokane Empire	L 51–60	4–4	Talking Stick Resort Arena	12,275
11	Saturday	April 29	7:05 PM	Green Bay Blizzard	W 64–29	5–4	Talking Stick Resort Arena	
12	Friday	May 5	6:05 PM	at Cedar Rapids Titans	W 34–32	6–4	U.S. Cellular Center	2,612
13	Friday	May 12	7:00 PM	at Spokane Empire	W 49–35	7–4	Spokane Veterans Memorial Arena	
14	Saturday	May 20	7:00 PM	Salt Lake Screaming Eagles	W 63–33	8-4	Talking Stick Resort Arena	
15	Sunday	May 28	4:00 PM	Nebraska Danger	W 43–33	9–4	Talking Stick Resort Arena	11,384
16	Saturday	June 3	7:00 PM	at Spokane Empire	W 33–16	10–4	Spokane Veterans Memorial Arena	
17	Sunday	June 11	3:00 PM	Cedar Rapids Titans	W 56–25	11–4	Talking Stick Resort Arena	13,251
18	Friday	June 16	6:00 PM	at Colorado Crush	W 47–44 (OT)	12–4	Budweiser Events Center	

==== Standings ====
2017 Intense Conference
	W	L	T	PCT	PF	PA	CON	GB	STK
y - Arizona Rattlers	12	4	0	.750	782	610	8–1	—	W8
x - Nebraska Danger	9	7	0	.563	717	660	5–2	3.0	W1
Spokane Empire	8	8	0	.500	654	677	7–5	4.0	L3
Salt Lake Screaming Eagles	5	11	0	.313	675	762	4–8	7.0	W1
Colorado Crush	3	13	0	.188	629	821	2–10	8.0	L4

=== Postseason ===
Round	Day	Date	Kickoff	Opponent	Results		Location
Round	Day	Date	Kickoff	Opponent	Score	Record	Location
United Conference Championship	Saturday	June 24	7:05pm	Nebraska Danger	W 62–36	1–0	Talking Stick Resort Arena
2017 United Bowl	Saturday	July 8	7:05pm	at Sioux Falls Storm	W 50–41	2–0	Denny Sanford Premier Center

== Roster ==
2017 Arizona Rattlers roster
Quarterbacks: 19 Cody Sokol; 2 Darron Thomas; 17 Jon Wolf; Running backs: 42 Ketrich Harmon; 14 Derrell Monroe; Wide receivers: 5 Anthony Amos; 12 Diondre Borel; 16 Jamal Miles; 9 Antonio Vaughan; 15 Dillion Winfrey	Offensive linemen: 50 Glen Haisley; -- Michael Huey; 58 Damian Love; 94 Lamar Mady; Defensive linemen: 95 Joshua Gordon; 31 Chris McAllister; 91 Justin Martin; 49 Edward Mosley	Linebackers: 30 Justin Shirk; Defensive backs: 11 Arkeith Brown; 3 Allen Chapman; 4 Nathan Lindsey; 6 Adam Sauder; 1 Markus Smith; Kickers: 22 Sawyer Petre	Reserve list: 53 Kevin Ashak OL (IR); 21 Josh Atkinson DB (IR); -- DeWayne Boston WR (IR); 74 DeShawn Byrd OL (DNR); -- Jared Dangerfield WR (IR); 47 Cody Galea DL (DNR); -- Frederick Gammage WR (IR); -- Luke Hayes OL (IR); -- Ian Joseph OL (Exempt); 93 Leon Mackey DL (IR/DFR); -- Vernon Sainvil DL (IR); 1 Tee Shepard DB (DNR); 25 LaVance Taylor RB (IR/DFR); 8 Fred Williams WR (DNR); rookies in italics Roster updated June 20, 2017; 25 Active, 14 Inactive
