= 2017 Sioux Falls Storm season =

Indoor Football League team season

- Owner: Todd Tryon
- General manager: Tyler Pederson
- Head coach: Kurtiss Riggs
- Home stadium: Denny Sanford Premier Center

Results
- Record: 14–2
- Conference place: 1st
- Playoffs: Won United Conference Championship Game 66–32 (Barnstormers); 2017 United Bowl (Rattlers)

The 2017 Sioux Falls Storm season was the team's eighteenth season as a professional indoor football franchise and ninth in the Indoor Football League (IFL). One of ten teams that competed in the IFL for the 2017 season, the Storm were members of the United Conference.

Led by head coach Kurtiss Riggs, the Storm played their home games at the Denny Sanford Premier Center in Sioux Falls, South Dakota.

== Staff ==
2017 Sioux Falls Storm staff
Front office: Owner – Todd Tryon; General manager – Tyler Pederson; Office manager / ticketing director / lightning girl & promo girl director – Allison Norgaard; Director of corporate sales – Jim Loria; Director of media relations – Kayley Shade; Director of gameday operations – Colin Neuroth; Accounting – Jennifer Quincey; Head of player control – Donnie Hilsenroth	Head coach - Kurtiss Riggs Offensive coaches: Offensive line coach – Paul Keizer; Wide receivers / kick return coach – Blake Wilson; Defensive coaches: Defensive coordinator – Brian Hermanson; Defensive line coach – Jared Fredenburg; Defensive backs / special teams coach – Andre Fields; Assistant defensive line coach – Cory Johnsen

== Schedule ==
Key: Win Tie Loss Bye

=== Regular season ===
All start times are local time

Week	Day	Date	Kickoff	Opponent	Results		Location	Attendance
Week	Day	Date	Kickoff	Opponent	Score	Record	Location	Attendance
1	Friday	February 17	7:05 PM	Arizona Rattlers	W 40–29	1–0	Denny Sanford Premier Center	8,963
2	Saturday	February 25	7:05 PM	Cedar Rapids Titans	W 51–26	2–0	U.S. Cellular Center	3,211
3	BYE							
4	Saturday	March 11	7:05 PM	at Nebraska Danger	W 42–28	3–0	Eihusen Arena	3,443
5	Monday	March 20	6:05 PM	Iowa Barnstormers	W 70–13	4–0	Denny Sanford Premier Center	5,246
6	Saturday	March 25	7:05 PM	Wichita Falls Nighthawks	W 55–21	5–0	Denny Sanford Premier Center	8,195
7	BYE							
8	Saturday	April 8	7:05 PM	at Cedar Rapids Titans	W 46–21	6–0	U.S. Cellular Center	
9	Saturday	April 15	7:05 PM	Green Bay Blizzard	W 55–33	7–0	Denny Sanford Premier Center	
10	Saturday	April 22	7:05 PM	at Green Bay Blizzard	W 56–49	8–0	Resch Center	3,535
11	Saturday	April 29	7:05 PM	at Wichita Falls Nighthawks	L 36–44	8–1	Kay Yeager Coliseum	
12	Saturday	May 6	7:05 PM	Spokane Empire	W 62–32	9–1	Denny Sanford Premier Center	
13	Saturday	May 13	7:05 PM	at Green Bay Blizzard	W 44–24	10–1	Resch Center	2,314
14	Saturday	May 20	7:05 PM	Cedar Rapids Titans	W 54–20	11–1	Denny Sanford Premier Center	
15	Sunday	May 27	7:05 PM	Wichita Falls Nighthawks	L 21–36	11–2	Denny Sanford Premier Center	
16	Saturday	June 3	5:00 PM	at Colorado Crush	W 51–29	12–2	Budweiser Events Center	
17	Saturday	June 10	7:05 PM	Nebraska Danger	W 41–38	13–2	Denny Sanford Premier Center	
18	Saturday	June 17	7:05 PM	at Iowa Barnstormers	W 45–24	14–2	Wells Fargo Arena	8,638

==== Standings ====
2017 United Conference
	W	L	T	PCT	PF	PA	CON	GB	STK
y - Sioux Falls Storm	14	2	0	.875	769	467	9–2	—	W3
x - Iowa Barnstormers	13	3	0	.813	702	580	8–3	1.0	L1
Wichita Falls Nighthawks	12	4	0	.750	832	745	6–2	2.0	L1
Green Bay Blizzard	3	13	0	.188	513	665	2–9	11.5	W1
Cedar Rapids Titans	1	15	0	.063	494	780	1–10	13.0	L10

=== Postseason ===
Round	Day	Date	Kickoff	Opponent	Results		Location
Round	Day	Date	Kickoff	Opponent	Score	Record	Location
United Conference Championship	Saturday	June 24	7:05pm	Iowa Barnstormers	W 66–32	1–0	Denny Sanford Premier Center
2017 United Bowl	Saturday	July 8	7:05pm	Arizona Rattlers	L 41–50	1–1	Denny Sanford Premier Center

== Roster ==
2017 Sioux Falls Storm roster
Quarterbacks: 8 Lorenzo Brown; Running backs: 22 Rolandan Finch; 20 Robbie Rouse; Wide receivers: 13 Melvin German III; 11 Judd Harrold; 11 Eric Shufford; 23 Mike Tatum; 1 Korey Williams	Offensive linemen: 71 Kyle Bryant; 75 Jabari Buckley; 69 Rashaud Mungro; -- Myniya Smith; Defensive linemen: 15 Claude Davis; 16 Cory Henry; 55 Khalif Mitchell; 56 Nicholas Richardson; 95 Ino Vitale	Linebackers: 3 Tyler Knight; Defensive backs: 4 J'Vontez Blackmon; 6 Elijah Fields; 12 Matt Hermanson; 18 Jermaine Robinson; 2 Rashard Smith; 24 Carlton Watkins; Special teams: 19 Justin Syrovatka	Reserve lists: -- Sheldon Augustine WR (IR); 16 Julian Gener LB (DNR); -- Jarien Moreland OL (DNR); -- Anthony White DL (DNR); -- Damon Williams DL (DNR); -- Tay Willis WR (DNR); rookies in italics Roster updated June 15, 2017; 25 Active, 6 Inactive
