= 2017 Cedar Rapids Titans season =

Indoor Football League team season

- Owner: Chris Kokalis; Bob Sullivan; David Bradley; Kenneth Moninski
- Head coach: Marvin McNutt
- Home stadium: U.S. Cellular Center

Results
- Record: 1–15
- Conference place: 5th
- Playoffs: Did not qualify

The 2017 Cedar Rapids Titans season was the team's sixth season as a professional indoor football franchise and sixth in the Indoor Football League (IFL). One of ten teams that compete in the IFL for the 2017 season, the Titans were members of the United Conference.

Led by head coach Marvin McNutt, the Titans played their home games at the U.S. Cellular Center in downtown Cedar Rapids, Iowa.

== Staff ==
2017 Cedar Rapids Titans staff
Front office: Co-Owner/General Manager – Chris Kokalis; Co-Owner – Bob Sullivan; Co-Owner – David Bradley; Co-Owner – Kenneth Moninski; Co-Owner – Barry, Toni and Alexis Smith; Director of operations – Travis Young; Director of Player Personnel- Scott Porter	Head coach: Head coach – Marvin McNutt; Offensive coaches: Offensive coordinator - Adrian Arrington; Offensive linemen – Moe Robinson; Offensive assistant – Zen Bliss; Defensive coaches: Defensive coordinator – Mitch Madland

== Schedule ==
Key: Win Tie Loss Bye

=== Pre-season ===
Week	Day	Date	Kickoff	Opponent	Results		Location
Week	Day	Date	Kickoff	Opponent	Score	Record	Location
1	Saturday	February 4	7:05pm	Iowa Barnstormers	L 26–38	0–1	U.S. Cellular Center

=== Regular season ===
All start times are local time

Week	Day	Date	Kickoff	Opponent	Results		Location	Attendance
Week	Day	Date	Kickoff	Opponent	Score	Record	Location	Attendance
1	Friday	February 17	7:05pm	at Green Bay Blizzard	L 13–46	0–1	U.S. Cellular Center	3,176
2	Saturday	February 25	7:05pm	Sioux Falls Storm	L 26-51	0-2	U.S. Cellular Center	3,211
3	BYE							
4	Saturday	March 11	7:05pm	Wichita Falls Nighthawks	L 23-42	0-3	U.S. Cellular Center	3,484
5	Sunday	March 19	3:05pm	Green Bay Blizzard	L 28-34	0-4	U.S. Cellular Center	2,874
6	Sunday	March 26	3:05pm	at Iowa Barnstormers	L 23–46	0–5	Wells Fargo Arena	5,653
7	Saturday	April 1	7:05pm	Green Bay Blizzard	W 41–37	1–5	Resch Center	
8	Saturday	April 8	7:05pm	Sioux Falls Storm	L 21–46	1–6	U.S. Cellular Center	
9	Saturday	April 15	7:05pm	at Wichita Falls Nighthawks	L 52–81	1–7	Kay Yeager Coliseum	
10	Saturday	April 22	7:05pm	Iowa Barnstormers	L 25–31	1–8	U.S. Cellular Center	
11	Friday	April 28	7:05pm	at Nebraska Danger	L 38–50	1–9	Eihusen Arena	
12	Friday	May 5	7:05pm	Arizona Rattlers	L 32–34	1–10	U.S. Cellular Arena	2,612
13	Saturday	May 13	7:05pm	at Iowa Barnstormers	L 54–56	1–11	Wells Fargo Arena	7,763
14	Saturday	May 20	7:05pm	at Sioux Falls Storm	L 20–54	1–12	Denny Sanford Premier Center	
15	Monday	May 29	7:05pm	at Salt Lake Screaming Eagles	L 27–64	1–13	Maverik Center	2,981
16	Saturday	June 3	7:05pm	Nebraska Danger	L 46–52 (OT)	1–14	U.S. Cellular Center	2,192
17	Saturday	June 11	3:00pm	at Arizona Rattlers	L 25–56	1–15	Talking Stick Resort Arena	13,251
18	BYE							

==== Standings ====
2017 United Conference
	W	L	T	PCT	PF	PA	CON	GB	STK
y - Sioux Falls Storm	14	2	0	.875	769	467	9–2	—	W3
x - Iowa Barnstormers	13	3	0	.813	702	580	8–3	1.0	L1
Wichita Falls Nighthawks	12	4	0	.750	832	745	6–2	2.0	L1
Green Bay Blizzard	3	13	0	.188	513	665	2–9	11.5	W1
Cedar Rapids Titans	1	15	0	.063	494	780	1–10	13.0	L10

== Roster ==
2017 Cedar Rapids Titans roster
Quarterbacks: 7 Brion Carnes; 1 Coy Dorothy; Running backs: 23 Julian Hayes; 13 Jamuel Jones; Wide receivers: 14 Marcus Barnett; 18 Conner Hollenbeck; 11 Tre' Parmalee; 6 Damond Powell	Offensive linemen: 78 Kyle Grome; 69 Grant Jones; 72 Byron Pinkston; 60 Domonique Wyatt; Defensive linemen: 42 Reshard Simmons; 91 Carlif Taylor; 10 Ausar Walcott	Linebackers: 45 Anthony Wallace; Defensive backs: 4 Fred Barnes; 3 Antoine Johnson; 5 B. J. Lowery; 8 Danzel McDaniel; 20 Shelton Miles; 9 Ridge Turner; 2 Jourdan Wickliffe; Special teams: 31 Michael Georgetti	Reserve lists: 69 Ben Curtis OL (DNR); 78 David Griffin OL (Exempt); 16 De'Joshua Johnson WR (DNR); 44 Delvin Jones DL (DNR); 51 Devin Jones LB (DNR); 14 Franklyn Williamson WR (IR); Roster updated June __, 2017; 23 Active, 6 Inactive
