= Damond =

Damond is a given name and surname. Notable people with the name include:

- Damond Jiniya (born 1974), American singer and lyricist
- Damond Powell (born 1992), American football player
- Damond Smith (born 1991), American football player
- Damond Williams (born 1980), American basketball player
- Justine Damond (1977–2017), Australian American fatally shot by police
