= Shelby County High School =

Shelby County High School may refer to:

- Shelby County High School (Alabama), United States
- Shelby County High School (Kentucky), United States
