= Seante Williams =

American gridiron football player (born 1981)

- Williams with the Green Bay Packers in 2004

No. 93
- Position: Defensive end

Personal information
- Born: September 16, 1981 (age 45); Newport News, Virginia, U.S.
- Listed height: 6 ft 7 in (2.01 m)
- Listed weight: 265 lb (120 kg)

Career information
- High school: Pensacola (FL) Pine Forest
- College: Coffeyville CC (2000–2001); Southern Miss (2002); Jacksonville State (2003)
- NFL draft: 2004: undrafted

Career history
- Green Bay Packers (2004)*; Jacksonville Jaguars (2004)*; Frankfurt Galaxy (2005); Colorado Crush (2006); Hamburg Sea Devils (2007); Toronto Argonauts (2008); Saskatchewan Roughriders (2008–2009); Philadelphia Soul (2011); Salt Lake Screaming Eagles (2017)
- * Offseason or practice squad member only

Seante Teron Williams (born September 16, 1981) is an American former professional football defensive end. He was originally signed by the Green Bay Packers as an undrafted free agent in 2004. He played college football at Jacksonville State.

== Early life and college ==
Williams was born in Newport News, Virginia. Williams graduated from Pine Forest High School of Pensacola, Florida in 2000. At Pine Forest, Williams lettered in basketball and football.

He originally signed with Auburn University but transferred to Coffeyville Community College. Williams redshirted his freshman year at Coffeyville in 2000 but sat out the 2001 season due to a back injury. After graduating from Coffeyville in December 2001, Williams enrolled at the University of Southern Mississippi for the spring 2002 semester.

In the 2002 season, Williams made 21 tackles in 11 games with the Southern Miss Golden Eagles. For his senior year in 2003, Williams played at the Division I-AA Jacksonville State. In 11 games, Williams made 14 tackles, 2.5 sacks, 2 tackles for loss, and 1 fumble recovery.

== Professional career ==
He signed with the Green Bay Packers as a non-drafted free agent on August 2, 2004 and was waived on August 30, 2004. He was a member of the Jacksonville Jaguars practice squad after being with the Packers.

He was allocated to the Frankfurt Galaxy of NFL Europe on April 5, 2005. He had 25 tackles, 5 sacks, 2 interceptions and a forced fumble.

He then signed with the Colorado Crush of the Arena Football League on October 28, 2005. He played two games with the Crush in 2006, recording 2 tackles before being released.

He signed as a free agent with the Toronto Argonauts on July 19, 2006. He remained on the Toronto Argonauts’ practice roster before being released on July 29, 2006.

He signed with the Hamburg Sea Devils of NFL Europa in 2007. He was part of the Sea Devils' first World Bowl in franchise history and last World Bowl championship in league history.

He signed as a free agent with the Toronto Argonauts on February 15, 2008, and was subsequently released by the Argonauts on June 21, 2008.

On July 23, 2008, he was signed to a contract with the Saskatchewan Roughriders and was placed on the Developmental Squad. Williams started in several games for the Roughriders during the 2008 season. He was released by the Riders on June 24, 2009.

On January 25, 2017, Williams signed with the Salt Lake Screaming Eagles of the Indoor Football League.
