= Damond Smith =

American gridiron football player (born 1991)

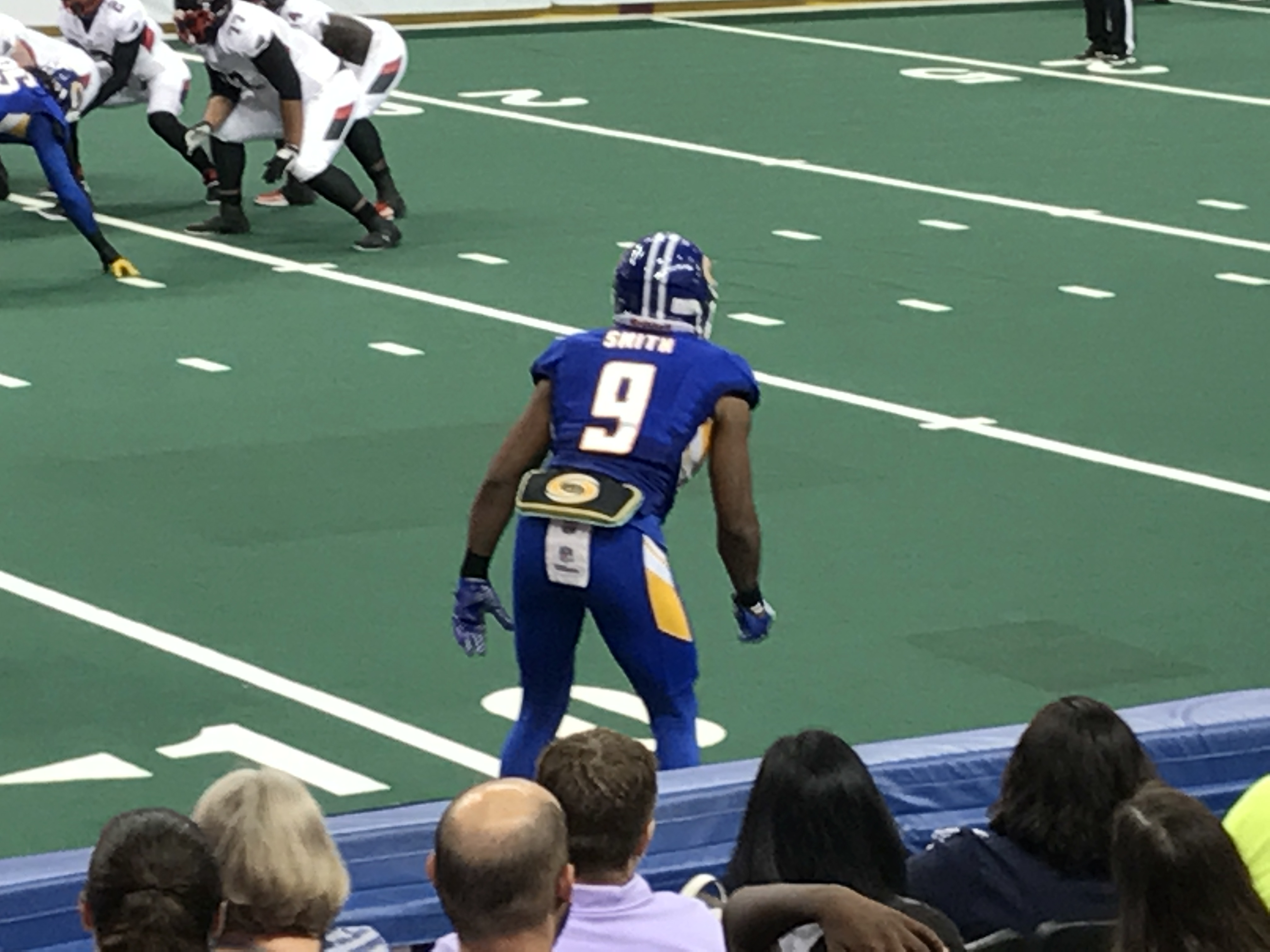
- Smith with the Tampa Bay Storm in 2017

No. 22, 9
- Position: Defensive back

Personal information
- Born: July 8, 1991 (age 35); Ecorse, Michigan, U.S.
- Listed height: 5 ft 11 in (1.80 m)
- Listed weight: 185 lb (84 kg)

Career information
- High school: Inkster (Inkster, Michigan)
- College: Western Michigan (2009–2010); South Alabama (2011)
- NFL draft: 2013: undrafted

Career history
- BC Lions (2013)*; Kansas City Chiefs (2014)*; Arizona Cardinals (2015)*; Arizona Rattlers (2017)*; Salt Lake Screaming Eagles (2017)*; Iowa Barnstormers (2017); Tampa Bay Storm (2017); Cleveland Gladiators (2017); Maine Mammoths (2018); Sioux Falls Storm (2018)
- * Offseason or practice squad member only

Career AFL statistics
- Tackles: 9
- Pass breakups: 3
- Stats at ArenaFan.com

Damond Earl Smith II (born July 8, 1991) is an American former professional football defensive back. He played college football for the Western Michigan Broncos and South Alabama Jaguars.

== Early life ==
Smith attended Inkster High School, where he played football.

College recruiting
Name	Hometown	School	Height	Weight	40^{‡}	Commit date
Damond Smith; CB	Inkster, Michigan	Inkster High School	6 ft 0 in (1.83 m)	175 lb (79 kg)	4.49	Dec 14, 2008
Damond Smith; CB	Recruit ratings: Scout: Rivals: 247Sports:					
Overall recruit ranking: Scout: 189 (CB) Rivals: -- (CB), -- (MI)
Note: In many cases, Scout, Rivals, 247Sports, On3, and ESPN may conflict in their listings of height and weight.; In these cases, the average was taken. ESPN grades are on a 100-point scale.; Sources: "Western Michigan Football Commitment List". Rivals.; "Western Michigan College Football Recruiting Commits". Scout.; "Scout.com Team Recruiting Rankings". Scout.; "2009 Team Ranking". Rivals.com.

== College career ==
Smith played for the Western Michigan Broncos from 2009 to 2010. He played in 18 games over two years and helped the Broncos to 11 wins. He transferred to South Alabama in 2011. He played in only 4 games during his South Alabama career. Smith was suspended after just 4 games for a violation of team and departmental rules.

== Professional career ==
Pre-draft measurables
Height	Weight	40-yard dash	10-yard split	20-yard split	20-yard shuttle	Three-cone drill	Vertical jump	Broad jump	Bench press
5 ft 11 in (1.80 m)	184 lb (83 kg)	4.59 s	1.59 s	2.60 s	4.21 s	6.95 s	37 in (0.94 m)	9 ft 10 in (3.00 m)	18 reps
All values from Jacksonville State Pro Day

In October 2013, Smith signed with the BC Lions of the Canadian Football League.

On July 28, 2014, Smith signed with the Kansas City Chiefs. On August 26, 2014, Smith was released by the Chiefs.

In February 2015, Smith signed with the Arizona Cardinals. On August 4, 2015, Smith was cut by the Cardinals.

On October 25, 2016, Smith signed with the Arizona Rattlers of the Indoor Football League (IFL). He was released on February 15, 2017.

On March 2, 2017, Smith signed with the Salt Lake Screaming Eagles of the IFL. He was released just 4 days later.

On March 9, 2017, Smith signed with the IFL's Iowa Barnstormers. On March 28, 2017, the Barnstormers placed Smith on the transfer list.

On March 17, 2017, Smith was assigned to the Tampa Bay Storm of the Arena Football League. On May 2, 2017, Smith was placed on reassignment.

On May 3, 2017, Smith was claimed off waivers by the Cleveland Gladiators. On May 18, Smith was placed on recallable reassignment. On May 23, 2017, Smith was assigned to the Gladiators once again. On June 5, 2017, Smith was placed on reassignment.

On January 23, 2018, Smith signed with the Maine Mammoths of the National Arena League. He was released on April 5, 2018.

On April 19, 2018, Smith signed with the Sioux Falls Storm of the IFL.
