= 2017 Nebraska Danger season =

Indoor Football League team season

- Owner: Charlie Bosselman; Laurie Bosselman; Brandi Bosselman
- Head coach: Hurtis Chinn
- Home stadium: Eihusen Arena

Results
- Record: 9-7
- Conference place: 2nd
- Playoffs: Lost Intense Conference Championship 36–62 (Rattlers)

The 2017 Nebraska Danger season was the seventh season for the Nebraska Danger as a professional indoor football franchise and their seventh in the Indoor Football League (IFL). One of ten teams that competed in the IFL for the 2017 season, the Nebraska Danger were members of the Intense Conference. For the first time ever, the team played their home games under head coach Hurtis Chinn who took over for Mike Davis. The Danger played in the Eihusen Arena at the Heartland Events Center in Grand Island, Nebraska.

== Staff ==
2017 Nebraska Danger staff
Front office: Owner / president - Charlie Bosselman; Owner – Laurie Bosselman; Owner – Brandi Bosselman; COO - Brian Fausch; Director of marketing - Stephanie King; Sales - Gus Patsios	Head coach: Head coach – Hurtis Chinn; Offensive coaches: Associate head coach / offensive linemen - Kyle Moore-Brown; Quarterbacks coach – Jameel Sewell; Defensive coaches: Defensive coordinator – Pig Brown; Defensive linemen - Adrian Davis; Special teams coaches: Special teams coordinator – Adrian Davis

== Schedule ==
Key: Win Tie Loss Bye

=== Regular season ===
All start times are local time

Week	Day	Date	Kickoff	Opponent	Results		Location	Attendance
Week	Day	Date	Kickoff	Opponent	Score	Record	Location	Attendance
1	Thursday	February 16	7:00pm	at Salt Lake Screaming Eagles	W 78–47	1-0	Maverik Center	8,191
2	Saturday	February 25	7:05pm	Wichita Falls Nighthawks	L 48-65	1-1	Eihusen Arena	
3	Sunday	March 5	4:00pm	at Colorado Crush	W 54-36	2-1	Budweiser Events Center	
4	Saturday	March 11	7:05pm	Sioux Falls Storm	L 28-42	2-2	Eihusen Arena	
5	BYE							
6	Saturday	March 25	7:05pm	Colorado Crush	W 55–23	3–2	Eihusen Arena	
7	Saturday	April 1	9:00pm	at Spokane Empire	W 42–36	4–2	Spokane Veterans Memorial Arena	
8	Friday	April 7	7:05pm	Arizona Rattlers	L 36–39	4–3	Eihusen Arena	
9	Saturday	April 15	7:05pm	at Iowa Barnstormers	L 14–48	4–4	Wells Fargo Arena	5,683
10	Saturday	April 22	7:05pm	Salt Lake Screaming Eagles	W 49–30	5–4	Eihusen Arena	
11	Friday	April 28	7:05pm	Cedar Rapids Titans	W 50–38	6–4	Eihusen Arena	
12	Friday	May 5	7:05pm	at Wichita Falls Nighthawks	L 40–57	6–5	Kay Yeager Coliseum	
13	BYE							
14	Saturday	May 20	7:0pm	Green Bay Blizzard	W 41–25	7–5	Eihusen Arena	
15	Sunday	May 28	7:00pm	at Arizona Rattlers	L 33–43	7–6	Talking Stick Resort Arena	11,384
16	Saturday	June 3	7:05pm	at Cedar Rapids Titans	W 52–46 (OT)	8–6	U.S. Cellular Center	2,192
17	Saturday	June 10	7:05pm	at Sioux Falls Storm	L 38–41	8–7	Denny Sanford Premier Center	
18	Saturday	June 17	7:05pm	Wichita Falls Nighthawks	W 59–44	9–7	Eihusen Arena	

==== Standings ====
2017 Intense Conference
	W	L	T	PCT	PF	PA	CON	GB	STK
y - Arizona Rattlers	12	4	0	.750	782	610	8–1	—	W8
x - Nebraska Danger	9	7	0	.563	717	660	5–2	3.0	W1
Spokane Empire	8	8	0	.500	654	677	7–5	4.0	L3
Salt Lake Screaming Eagles	5	11	0	.313	675	762	4–8	7.0	W1
Colorado Crush	3	13	0	.188	629	821	2–10	8.0	L4

=== Postseason ===
Round	Day	Date	Kickoff	Opponent	Results		Location
Round	Day	Date	Kickoff	Opponent	Score	Record	Location
Intense Conference Championship	Saturday	July 24	7:05pm	at Arizona Rattlers	L 36-62	0-1	Talking Stick Resort Arena

== Roster ==
2017 Nebraska Danger roster
Quarterbacks: 10 Patrick McCain; 17 Drew Powell; Running backs: 2 Rob Brown; Wide receivers: 15 Jarred Haggins; 1 Carl Sims; 6 Dimitri Stimphil; 4 Eric Thomas	Offensive linemen: 65 Lawrence Martin IV; 72 Darius Savage; 71 Mike Trice; 78 Trevin Wallace; Defensive linemen: 93 Maurice Chavis; 43 Herbert Gonzalez; 11 Xzavie Jackson; 99 Colton Miles-Nash; 8 Eze Obiora	Linebackers: 45 Kendrick Causey; 44 Nikolas Sierra; Defensive backs: 7 Robert Brown; 17 Omar Cook; 5 Courtney Hall; 9 Jamar Love; 5 Demetruce McNeal; 13 Trey Wafford; Special teams: 25 Josh Gable	Reserve lists: 2 Lyle McCombs RB (IR); 20 James Ward RB (IR); Roster updated June 20, 2017; 25 Active, 4 Inactive → More rosters
