= Aaron Wilmer =

American football player (born 1992)

No. 16
- Position: Quarterback

Personal information
- Born: July 4, 1992 (age 34)
- Listed height: 5 ft 10 in (1.78 m)
- Listed weight: 215 lb (98 kg)

Career information
- High school: George Washington (Philadelphia, Pennsylvania)
- College: Delaware Valley
- NFL draft: 2015: undrafted

Career history
- BC Lions (2015)*; Calgary Stampeders (2016)*; Spokane Empire (2017)
- * Offseason or practice squad member only

Aaron Wilmer (born July 4, 1992) is an American former professional football quarterback. He played college football for the Delaware Valley Aggies.

== Early life ==
Wilmer played high school football and baseball at George Washington High School, where he was a first team All-League player as a junior and senior.

== College career ==
Wilmer started his collegiate career at West Chester University where he red-shirted as a freshman. From 2011 to 2014, he played for the Aggies at Delaware Valley University. Wilmer started all four of his collegiate seasons at Delaware Valley University where he was a four-time All-Middle Atlantic Conference (MAC) and posted a 34–9 record as a starter. He also led the Aggies to a MAC Championship in 2011 and two trips to the NCAA Division III Playoffs (2011 and 2014).

Wilmer finished his career ranked second in school history in completions (692), passing yards (10,157), passing touchdowns (84), and total offense (11,795 yards) becoming just one of 26 QB's (at any NCAA level) to reach the 10,000-1,000 passing-rushing career yardage plateaus. During his senior season in 2014, he completed 185-of-316 pass attempts for 3,228 yards and 30 touchdowns while adding 310 rushing yards and seven scores on the ground. Wilmer was teammate of Rasheed Bailey.

=== Statistics ===
Year	Team	Passing							Rushing			
Year	Team	Comp	Att	Yards	Pct.	TD	Int	QB rating	Att	Yards	Avg	TD
2010	West Chester	Redshirt										
2011	Delaware Valley	189	319	2,729	59.2	23	10	148.6	--	--	--	--
2012\	Delaware Valley	165	290	2,087	56.9	16	7	130.7	--	--	--	--
2013	Delaware Valley	153	269	2,113	56.9	15	10	133.8	--	--	--	--
2014	Delaware Valley	185	316	3,228	58.5	30	8	170.6	--	--	--	--
Career		692	1,194	10,157	58.0	84	35	145.9	--	--	--	--

== Professional career ==
After his collegiate career, Wilmer signed with MRM Agent Marty Magid, who also represented Elvis Dumervil. Wilmer worked out with the Philadelphia Eagles and competed in the NFL Regional Combine. He spent time with the Canadian Football League's BC Lions and the Calgary Stampeders.

On October 25, 2016, Wilmer signed with the Spokane Empire of the Indoor Football League.

== Personal life ==
Wilmer is the son of Thomas and Dontissa Wilmer and he has one daughter, Giovana. As well as two older brothers, Thomas and Damien.
