= Diondre Borel =

American football player (born 1988)

No. 18, 19, 12, 13
- Position: Quarterback

Personal information
- Born: December 12, 1988 (age 37); San Jose, California, U.S.
- Listed height: 6 ft 0 in (1.83 m)
- Listed weight: 199 lb (90 kg)

Career information
- High school: Freedom (Oakley, California)
- College: Utah State
- NFL draft: 2011: undrafted

Career history
- Green Bay Packers (2011–2012)*; Tampa Bay Buccaneers (2012)*; Tennessee Titans (2012–2013)*; San Jose SaberCats (2015); Spokane Empire (2016); Los Angeles KISS (2016); Arizona Rattlers (2017); Cedar Rapids River Kings (2019); Wasa Royals (2019); Oakland Panthers (2020); Fayetteville Mustangs (2023); Gillette Mustangs(2023); Salt Lake Salute (2023); Colorado Spartans (2024); Lugano Rebels (2024)*; Amarillo Venom (2024); Washington Wolfpack (2024)
- * Offseason or practice squad member only

Awards and highlights
- ArenaBowl champion (2015); United Bowl champion (2017)

Career AFL statistics
- Receptions: 8
- Receiving yards: 79
- Receiving touchdowns: 1
- Total tackles: 4
- Interceptions: 1
- Stats at ArenaFan.com
- Stats at Pro Football Reference

Diondre Michael Borel (born December 12, 1988) is an American professional football quarterback. After playing college football for Utah State University, he was signed as an undrafted free agent by the Green Bay Packers in 2011. Borel was Utah State's starting quarterback from 2008 to 2010, finishing his collegiate career ranked second in school history with 6,698 passing yards and 8,096 yards of total offense.

== College career ==
Borel earned a scholarship from Utah State University after a distinguished prep career at Freedom High School in Oakley, California. He was a multi-threat at Utah State, serving as starting quarterback and punter. Borel started three years at quarterback at Utah State, where he threw for 6,698 yards and tallied 8,096 yards of total offense during his college career.

=== Statistics ===
Year	Team	Passing								Rushing			
Year	Team	Cmp	Att	Pct	Yds	Y/A	TD	Int	Rtg	Att	Yds	Avg	TD
2007	Utah State	0	0	0.0	0	0.0	0	0	0.0	5	10	2.0	0
2008	Utah State	136	242	56.2	1,705	7.0	11	10	122.1	179	632	3.5	5
2009	Utah State	214	366	58.5	2,885	7.9	17	4	137.8	173	458	2.6	6
2010	Utah State	167	314	53.2	2,108	6.7	8	13	109.7	142	298	2.1	7
Career		517	922	56.1	6,698	7.3	36	27	124.1	499	1,398	2.8	18

== Professional career ==
=== Green Bay Packers ===
He went unselected in the 2011 NFL draft, and signed as a free agent with the Green Bay Packers, who converted him to wide receiver. Borel spent his first year in the NFL on Green Bay's practice squad.

=== Tennessee Titans ===
In 2012, he was signed by the Tennessee Titans, after spending several weeks on the practice squad of the Tampa Bay Buccaneers. On August 26, 2013, he was waived by the Titans.

=== San Jose SaberCats ===
On November 19, 2014, Borel was assigned to the San Jose SaberCats of the Arena Football League.

=== Spokane Empire ===
On April 27, 2016, Borel signed with the Spokane Empire of the Indoor Football League (IFL).

=== Los Angeles KISS ===
On July 31, 2016, Borel was assigned to the Los Angeles KISS.

=== Arizona Rattlers ===
On October 28, 2016, Borel signed with the Arizona Rattlers. On July 8, 2017, the Rattlers defeated the Sioux Falls Storm in the United Bowl by a score of 50–41.

=== The Spring League ===
Borel participated in The Spring League Showcase game in July 2017.

=== Wasa Royals ===
Borel signed with Finnish Maple League team Wasa Royals before 2019 season.

=== Fayetteville Mustangs ===
On February 21, 2023, Borel signed with the Fayetteville Mustangs of the National Arena League (NAL).
