= Toby Jackson =

American football player (born 1986)

No. 12
- Position: Defensive end

Personal information
- Born: October 18, 1986 (age 40)
- Listed height: 6 ft 4 in (1.93 m)
- Listed weight: 265 lb (120 kg)

Career information
- High school: Griffin (GA)
- College: UCF
- NFL draft: 2013: undrafted

Career history
- Dallas Cowboys (2013)*; Orlando Predators (2015); Spokane Empire (2016–2017); Columbus Lions (2017); Massachusetts Pirates (2018–?)
- * Offseason or practice squad member only

Career AFL statistics
- Tackles: 8.5
- Sacks: 1
- Stats at ArenaFan.com

Toby Jackson (born October 18, 1986) is an American former football defensive end. He played college football at the University of Central Florida.

== Early life ==
Jackson attended Griffin High School in Griffin, Georgia, where he was a standout defensive end on the football team. Jackson was heavily recruited out of high school, earning scholarship offers from Alabama, Auburn, Clemson, Georgia, Florida State, Ole Miss and Tennessee among others.

== College career ==
=== Junior college ===
Jackson signed with Georgia out of high school, but after failing to qualify academically, Jackson enrolled at Hargrave Military Academy. After a year at Hargrave, Jackson could still not qualify academically, and enrolled at Navarro College. Jackson helped Navarro to a national championship during the 2010 season, earning MVP honors.

=== UCF ===
Jackson signed with UCF out of Navarro.

== Professional career ==
After going undrafted in the 2013 NFL Supplemental draft, Jackson signed with the Dallas Cowboys in July, 2013. Jackson was released after the Cowboys third preseason game.

=== Orlando Predators ===
In June 2015, Jackson signed with the Orlando Predators of the Arena Football League. Jackson appeared in 3 games for the Predators, recording a sack.

=== Spokane Empire ===
Jackson signed with the Spokane Empire of the Indoor Football League for the 2016 season.

=== Columbus Lions ===
On June 15, 2017, Jackson signed with the Columbus Lions. On August 30, 2017, Jackson re-signed with the Lions. On November 20, 2017, Jackson was released by the Lions.

=== Massachusetts Pirates ===
On March 26, 2018, Jackson signed with the Massachusetts Pirates.
