= Paris Cotton =

American gridiron football player (born 1989)

No. 12, 22
- Position: Running back

Personal information
- Born: November 2, 1989 (age 37); Miami, Florida, U.S.
- Listed height: 5 ft 8 in (1.73 m)
- Listed weight: 194 lb (88 kg)

Career information
- High school: Hialeah (Hialeah, Florida)
- College: Central Michigan

Career history
- 2013: Hamilton Tiger-Cats*
- 2014–2015: Winnipeg Blue Bombers
- 2016: Calgary Stampeders*
- 2017: Colorado Crush
- * Offseason or practice squad member only

Career CFL statistics
- Rushes: 122
- Rushing yards: 629
- Rushing TDs: 4
- Receptions: 24
- Receiving yards: 243
- Receiving TDs: 1
- Stats at CFL.ca

Paris Cotton (born November 2, 1989) is an American former professional football running back who played for the Winnipeg Blue Bombers of the Canadian Football League (CFL). He played college football at Central Michigan University.

== Early life ==
Cotton attended Hialeah High School in Hialeah, Florida.

== College career ==
Cotton played football for the Central Michigan Chippewas from 2008 to 2011. He finished his career with 1,381 rushing yards and 9 rushing touchdowns.

== Professional career ==
Cotton was rated the 56th best running back in the 2012 NFL draft by NFLDraftScout.com.

Pre-draft measurables
Height	Weight	40-yard dash	10-yard split	20-yard split	20-yard shuttle	Three-cone drill	Vertical jump	Broad jump	Bench press
5 ft 7 in (1.70 m)	190 lb (86 kg)	4.43 s	1.53 s	2.56 s	4.40 s	6.81 s	32 1/2 in (0.83 m)	10 ft 6 in (3.20 m)	18 reps
All values from Central Michigan Pro Day

Cotton was signed by the CFL's Hamilton Tiger-Cats on April 2, 2013. He was released by the Tiger-Cats on April 23, 2013.

Cotton signed with the Winnipeg Blue Bombers of the CFL on April 22, 2014. Cotton began the 2014 regular season as the #2 back behind incumbent Nic Grigsby. Through October, Cotton had 11 rushing attempts for 20 yards. When Grigsby was traded to Hamilton in later that month, Cotton became the starter for the remainder of the season. Starting the last 4 games of the season, Cotton amassed 341 yards on 55 carries (per game average of 85.2 yards on 13.8 carries) with 3 rushing touchdowns. He finished the season with 92 receiving yards from 10 receptions. Cotton began the 2015 CFL season as the Bombers starting running back, leading the team in rushing attempts for the first 7 games of the season. In the middle of August, Paris suffered a broken arm and would miss the remainder of the 2015 season. Cotton finished the season with 56 carries for 268 yards with 1 rushing touchdown. He also contributed in the passing game, catching 14 passes for 151 yards and 1 touchdown. On February 18, the Bomber announced that they had released Cotton.

Cotton was signed to the Calgary Stampeders' practice roster on September 1, 2016.

On January 20, 2017 Cotton signed with the Colorado Crush of the Indoor Football League (IFL).
