= Forrestal Hickman =

American gridiron football player (born 1993)

Sioux Falls Storm
- Position: Offensive lineman
- Roster status: Active

Personal information
- Born: April 15, 1993 (age 33); Topeka, Kansas, U.S.
- Listed height: 6 ft 7 in (2.01 m)
- Listed weight: 330 lb (150 kg)

Career information
- High school: Holton (KS)
- College: Missouri S&T
- NFL draft: 2015: undrafted

Career history
- San Diego Chargers (2015)*; Montreal Alouettes (2016); Colorado Crush (2017); Sioux Falls Storm (2018–present)
- * Offseason or practice squad member only

Forrestal Hickman (born April 15, 1993) is an offensive tackle for the Sioux Falls Storm of the Indoor Football League (IFL). Hickman signed with the San Diego Chargers as an undrafted free agent in 2015. He played in two preseason games for the Chargers, and was then signed to the Montreal Alouettes practice squad for 2015 season. Hickman was raised to the active roster and played the final game of the year for Montreal. In 2016, he played in both preseason games before being cut by Montreal. He was then signed by the Colorado Crush of the Indoor Football League, where he started all but one game. He attended Missouri University of Science and Technology where he played left tackle.

== Colorado Crush ==
On November 14, 2016, Hickman signed with the Colorado Crush of the Indoor Football League (IFL).

== Sioux Falls Storm ==
On October 10, 2017, Hickman signed with the Sioux Falls Storm.
