= Jarien Moreland =

American football player (born 1988)

No. 64
- Position: Offensive lineman

Personal information
- Born: December 26, 1988 (age 37); Belle Glade, Florida
- Listed height: 6 ft 5 in (1.96 m)
- Listed weight: 310 lb (141 kg)

Career information
- High school: Belle Glade (FL) Glades Central
- College: Southern Illinois
- NFL draft: 2014: undrafted

Career history
- Spokane Shock (2015); Tampa Bay Storm (2015)*; Spokane Empire (2016)*; Portland Steel (2016); Sioux Falls Storm (2017); Washington Valor (2017)
- * Offseason or practice squad member only

Career AFL statistics
- Receptions: 4
- Receiving yards: 41
- Stats at ArenaFan.com

Jarien Moreland (born December 26, 1988) is an American former football offensive lineman. He played college football at Southern Illinois University Carbondale and attended Glades Central High School in Belle Glade, Florida. He was a member of the Spokane Shock, Tampa Bay Storm, Spokane Empire, Portland Steel, Sioux Falls Storm, and Washington Valor.

== College career ==
Moreland played for the UCF Knights in 2008, Florida A&M from 2010 to 2012 Southern Illinois Salukis in 2013. He was the team's starter his final season and helped the Salukis to 7 wins. He played in 27 games during his career including 20 starts at guard.

== Professional career ==
=== Spokane Shock ===
On March 6, 2015, Moreland was assigned to the Spokane Shock of the Arena Football League. On April 2, 2015, he was placed on recallable reassignment. Moreland appeared in one game for the Shock.

=== Tampa Bay Storm ===
On April 3, 2015, Moreland was traded to the Tampa Bay Storm for claim order position. On April 7, 2015, he was placed on refused to report by the Storm. On July 9, 2015, Moreland was placed on reassignment.

=== Spokane Empire ===
On November 30, 2015, Moreland signed with the Spokane Empire of the Indoor Football League.

=== Portland Steel ===
On February 3, 2016, Moreland was assigned to the Portland Thunder. On May 23, 2016, Moreland was placed on injured reserve.

=== Sioux Falls Storm ===
Moreland signed with the Sioux Falls Storm of the Indoor Football League on November 15, 2016. On January 21, 2017, Moreland was placed on the refused to report list.

=== Washington Valor ===
Moreland was assigned to the Washington Valor on February 1, 2017. On May 25, 2017, Moreland was placed on injured reserve.
