= Kevin Guy =

American football player, coach, and executive (born 1972)

Arizona Rattlers
- Title: Head coach and President

Personal information
- Born: December 6, 1972 (age 53); Birmingham, Alabama, U.S.
- Listed height: 6 ft 0 in (1.83 m)
- Listed weight: 185 lb (84 kg)

Career information
- Positions: Wide receiver, defensive back
- High school: Shelby County (AL)
- College: West Alabama
- NFL draft: 1996: undrafted

Career history

Playing
- Minnesota Fighting Pike (1996); New Jersey Red Dogs (1997–1999); Orlando Predators (1999)

Coaching
- New Jersey Red Dogs (2000) Defensive coordinator/Interim head coach; Florida Bobcats (2001) Defensive coordinator; Tennessee Valley Vipers (2002–2004) Head coach; Rio Grande Valley Dorados (2005) Head coach; San Jose SaberCats (2006–2007) Defensive coordinator; Arizona Rattlers (2008–present) Head coach

Operations
- Arizona Rattlers (2009–2020) General manager; Arizona Rattlers (2020–present) Team president

Awards and highlights
- As a coach: 4× ArenaBowl champion (2007, 2012, 2013, 2014); United Bowl champion (2017); 2x IFL National Champion (2024, 2026); IFL Coach of the Year (2021); 2× AFL Coach of the Year (2011, 2016); af2 Coach of the Year (2003); af2 Hall of Fame; As an executive: IFL Executive of the Year (2021)

Career AFL statistics
- Tackles: 136
- Forced fumbles: 1
- Touchdowns: 1
- Interceptions: 7
- Stats at ArenaFan.com

Head coaching record
- Regular season: 248–79 (.758)
- Postseason: 26–15 (.634)
- Career: 274–94 (.745)

Kevin Guy (born December 6, 1972) is an American football coach and former player. He is currently the head coach for the Arizona Rattlers of the Indoor Football League (IFL). He played college football at the University of West Alabama, and was a wide receiver and defensive back in the Arena Football League (AFL) from 1996 to 1999. He has been a football coach since 2000, and first served as a head coach in 2000 as the interim head coach for the New Jersey Red Dogs. After being the defensive coordinator for the San Jose SaberCats from 2006 to 2007, he became the Rattlers head coach in 2008.

In 2018, his wife Cathy became co-owner of a new Tucson-based IFL franchise, called the Tucson Sugar Skulls, set to play in 2019.

== Early life ==
Born in Birmingham, Alabama, Guy grew up in Alabama then continued his high school career in Shelby County High School in Columbiana, Alabama, where he was a member of the Wildcats football team from 1987 to 1990. Kevin then enrolled at University of West Alabama, and played wide receiver before finishing his career as a defensive back on the West Alabama Tigers football team from 1991 to 1995.

== College career ==
Guy was tested by many high level programs, taking visits to Alabama, Auburn, Mississippi State, Samford and Chattanooga, but only received a scholarship from West Alabama.

== Professional career ==
The Minnesota Fighting Pike signed Guy after he went unselected in the 1996 NFL draft. He played four years as a wide receiver and defensive back in the AFL, with Minnesota in 1996, the New Jersey Red Dogs from 1997 to 1999, and the Orlando Predators in 1999. He first became a regular starting defensive back in 1996 with Minnesota. In 1998 with New Jersey, he helped lead the Red Dogs to the AFL Semifinal.

== Coaching career ==
In 2000, while not even being one year removed from the AFL, Guy was a defensive coordinator for the Red Dogs under head coach Frank Mattiace. With four games left in the 2000 season, the Red Dogs fired Mattiace, and Guy served the teams interim head coach for the remainder of the season. In 2001, he returned to the AFL as a defensive coordinator for the Florida Bobcats. He then became a head coach at the af2 level, starting in 2002 with the Tennessee Valley Vipers. After coaching Tennessee to three consecutive playoff berths 2002, 2003 and 2004, he moved to the Rio Grande Valley Dorados, and served as head coach during the 2005 season and led the Dorados to the National Conference Championship game. After the 2005 season, Guy was named the defensive coordinator for the San Jose SaberCats of the AFL. Guy's defensive squad helped lead the SaberCats to back-to-back American Conference Championship Game appearances, and a berth in ArenaBowl XXI, where the SaberCats would defeat the Chicago Rush. Following the SaberCats ArenaBowl victory, the Arizona Rattlers named Guy their 4th head coach in franchise history. Guy led the team to playoff appearances in his first five seasons there, making four consecutive appearances in the ArenaBowl, winning ArenaBowl XXV and ArenaBowl XXVI both over the Philadelphia Soul, and winning ArenaBowl XXVII over the Cleveland Gladiators.

In September 2005, Guy was named the defensive coordinator of the San Jose SaberCats of the AFL.

Guy was named the head coach of the Arizona Rattlers in August 2007.

On September 15, 2020, it was announced Guy would be assuming the role of Arizona Rattlers team president in addition to his head coaching and general manager duties.

On July 27, 2024, Guy became the winningest coach in arena/indoor football history with 262 victories following the Rattlers' 39-38 win over the Vegas Knight Hawks in the first round of the 2024 IFL Playoffs.

== Head coaching record ==
League	Team	Year	Regular season				Postseason			
League	Team	Year	Won	Lost	Win %	Finish	Won	Lost	Win %	Result
AFL	NJ	2000	1	3	.250	4th in NC East	0	0	.000	
af2	TV	2002	13	3	.813	1st in NC South	0	1	.000	Lost to Birmingham Steel Dogs in Round 1
af2	TV	2003	14	2	.875	1st in AC South	1	1	.500	Lost to Macon Knights in American Conference Championship
af2	TV	2004	12	4	.750	1st in AC Mid-South	0	1	.000	Lost to Florida Firecats in American Conference Semi-Finals
af2	RGV	2005	10	6	.750	1st in AC Mid-South	2	1	.667	Lost to Memphis Xplorers in National Conference Finals
af2 total			49	15	.766		3	4	.429	
AFL	ARI	2008	8	8	.500	2nd in AC West	0	1	.000	Lost to Grand Rapids Rampage in Wild Card
AFL	ARI	2010	10	6	.625	2nd in NC West	0	1	.000	Lost to Spokane Shock in Conference Semifinals
AFL	ARI	2011	16	2	.889	1st in NC West	2	1	.667	Lost to Jacksonville Sharks in ArenaBowl XXIV
AFL	ARI	2012	13	5	.722	1st in NC West	3	0	1.000	Won ArenaBowl XXV
AFL	ARI	2013	15	3	.833	1st in NC West	3	0	1.000	Won ArenaBowl XXVI
AFL	ARI	2014	15	3	.833	1st in NC West	3	0	1.000	Won ArenaBowl XXVII
AFL	ARI	2015	14	4	.778	1st in NC West	1	1	.500	Lost to San Jose SaberCats in NC Championship
AFL	ARI	2016	13	3	.813	1st in NC	2	1	.667	Lost to Philadelphia Soul in ArenaBowl XXIX
ARI total			104	34	.754		14	5	.737	3 ArenaBowls
AFL total			105	37	.739		14	5	.737	3 ArenaBowls
IFL	ARI	2017	12	4	.750	1st in Intense	2	0	1.000	Won 2017 United Bowl
IFL	ARI	2018	11	3	.786	2nd in League	0	1	.000	Lost to Sioux Falls Storm in League Semifinals
IFL	ARI	2019	14	0	1.000	1st in League	1	1	.500	Lost to Sioux Falls Storm in United Bowl
IFL	ARI	2021	12	2	.857	1st in League	2	1	.667	Lost to Massachusetts Pirates in United Bowl
IFL	ARI	2022	13	3	.813	1st in West	1	1	.500	Lost to Northern Arizona Wranglers in Western Conference Championship
IFL	ARI	2023	11	4	.733	1st in West	0	1	.000	Lost to Northern Arizona Wranglers in Western Conference Semifinals
IFL	ARI	2024	11	5	.688	3rd in West	3	0	1.000	Won 2024 IFL National Championship
IFL	ARI	2025	10	6	.625	2nd in West	0	1	.000	Lost to San Diego Strikeforce in Western Conference Semifinals
IFL total			94	27	.777		9	6	.600	2 Championships
Career total			248	79	.758		26	15	.634	5 Championships
