= 2017 Wichita Falls Nighthawks season =

Indoor Football League team season

- Owner: Drew Carnes
- Head coach: Billy Back
- Home stadium: Kay Yeager Coliseum

Results
- Record: 12–4
- Conference place: 3rd
- Playoffs: Did not qualify

The 2017 Wichita Falls Nighthawks season was the third and final season for the professional indoor football franchise and second in the Indoor Football League (IFL). One of ten teams that compete in the IFL for the 2017 season, the Nighthawks were members of the United Conference.

Led by head coach Billy Back, the Nighthawks played their home games at the Kay Yeager Coliseum in Wichita Falls, Texas.

== Staff ==
2017 Wichita Falls Nighthawks staff
Front office: Owner – Drew Carnes	Head coach - Billy Back Offensive coaches: Offensive assistant – Rudy Hawkins; Offensive line coach – Brian Schmidt; Defensive coaches: Defensive coordinator – Ernie Cooke; Defensive line coach – Brian Schmidt

== Schedule ==
Key: Win Tie Loss Bye

=== Regular season ===
All start times are local time

Week	Day	Date	Kickoff	Opponent	Results		Location	Attendance
Week	Day	Date	Kickoff	Opponent	Score	Record	Location	Attendance
1	Saturday	February 18	7:05pm	Iowa Barnstormers	W 68–53	1–0	Kay Yeager Coliseum	3,353
2	Saturday	February 25	7:05pm	at Nebraska Danger	W 65-48	2-0	Eihusen Arena	
3	Friday	March 3	7:05pm	Spokane Empire	W 57-56 (2OT)	3-0	Kay Yeager Coliseum	
4	Saturday	March 11	7:05pm	at Cedar Rapids Titans	W 42-23	4-0	U.S. Cellular Center	3,484
5	BYE							
6	Saturday	March 25	7:05pm	at Sioux Falls Storm	L 21–55	4–1	Denny Sanford Premier Center	
7	Saturday	April 1	7:00pm	at Arizona Rattlers	W 60–53	5–1	Talking Stick Resort Arena	10,879
8	Saturday	April 8	7:05pm	Salt Lake Screaming Eagles	W 39–33	6–1	Kay Yeager Coliseum	
9	Friday	April 14	7:05pm	Cedar Rapids Titans	W 81–52	7–1	Kay Yeager Coliseum	
10	Friday	April 21	7:05pm	at Colorado Crush	L 73–77	7–2	Budweiser Events Center	
11	Saturday	April 29	7:05pm	Sioux Falls Storm	W 44–36	8–2	Kay Yeager Coliseum	
12	Friday	May 5	7:05pm	Nebraska Danger	W 57–40	9–2	Kay Yeager Coliseum	
13	BYE							
14	Saturday	May 20	7:05pm	Iowa Barnstormers	L 47–50	9–3	Kay Yeager Coliseum	
15	Saturday	May 27	7:05pm	at Sioux Falls Storm	W 36–21	10–3	Denny Sanford Premier Center	
16	Saturday	June 3	7:05pm	at Green Bay Blizzard	W 44–37	11–3	Resch Center	2,377
17	Saturday	June 10	7:05pm	Colorado Crush	W 54–52	12–3	Kay Yeager Coliseum	
18	Saturday	June 17	7:05pm	at Nebraska Danger	L 44–59	12–4	Eihusen Arena	

==== Standings ====
2017 United Conference
	W	L	T	PCT	PF	PA	CON	GB	STK
y - Sioux Falls Storm	14	2	0	.875	769	467	9–2	—	W3
x - Iowa Barnstormers	13	3	0	.813	702	580	8–3	1.0	L1
Wichita Falls Nighthawks	12	4	0	.750	832	745	6–2	2.0	L1
Green Bay Blizzard	3	13	0	.188	513	665	2–9	11.5	W1
Cedar Rapids Titans	1	15	0	.063	494	780	1–10	13.0	L10

== Roster ==
2017 Wichita Falls Nighthawks roster
Quarterbacks: 1 Charles McCullum; Running backs: 3 Tyler Williams; Wide receivers: 16 Zachary Ducker; 7 Troy Evans; 13 Tyrell Goodman; 4 Jordan Jolly; 6 Josh Stewart; 8 Demarius Washington	Offensive linemen: 94 Jarve Dean; 90 Antonio Foster; 91 Clint Marsh; 95 Damien Parris; -- Nathaniel Ryan; 95 Tino Tuilata; Defensive linemen: 18 Kewan Alford; 17 Demetrius Hill; 23 Chris Martin; 52 Nmesoma Okafor; 52 Toni Pulu; 77 Walter Thomas	Linebackers: 15 Robert Haynes; Defensive backs: 2 Michael Carter; 20 Neiko Conway; 21 Michael Green; 11 Tony Grimes; 9 Norris Wrenn III; Special teams: 12 Rockne Belmonte	Reserve lists: 11 Phillip Barnett WR (Exempt); -- Joe Craig WR (Exempt); 19 Dyron Dye DL (IR); -- JaJuan Harley DB (Exempt); 10 Tyron Laughinghouse WR (IR); 5 Chris Parks DB (IR/DFR); 6 Angelo Pease RB (IR); Practice squad: currently vacant; rookies in italics Roster updated June 6, 2017; 27 Active, 7 Inactive
