= Maine Mammoths =

American indoor football team

Logo

General information
- Founded: 2017
- Folded: 2020
- Headquartered: Portland, Maine at the Cross Insurance Arena
- Colors: Maroon, gold, white
- MaineMammoths.com

Personnel
- Owner: National Sports Ventures

Team history
- Maine Mammoths (2018)

Home fields
- Cross Insurance Arena (2018)

League / conference affiliations
- National Arena League (2018)

The Maine Mammoths were a professional indoor football team that was a member of the National Arena League (NAL) for the 2018 season. Based in Portland, Maine, the Mammoths played their home games at the Cross Insurance Arena. The Mammoths are the first professional indoor or arena football team to be located in Maine.

== History ==
After various speculation beforehand, the Mammoths were officially announced as a National Arena League (NAL) expansion team on December 5, 2017. The team was created by National Sports Ventures, a company led by NAL executive Rob Storm and Atlanta businessman Richard Maslia and also included Jeff Bouchy, owner of the NAL's Jacksonville Sharks and the league's expansion chairman. The Mammoths also introduced indoor football coaching veteran James Fuller as their first head coach and veteran indoor football quarterback Jonathan Bane as their first player. After a slow start to the season going 2–8 through ten games, the team ended the season on a five-game winning streak to finish 7–8 and one spot outside the playoffs. The team was named franchise of the year.

Following their first season, the team planned to tweak its schedule to increase attendance, which had dwindled after a strong opening week. The team also announced it was for sale and looking for local ownership. On February 5, 2019, the team announced an indefinite hiatus beginning with the 2019 season as the team reportedly negotiates with local ownership. In September 2019, the league announced that a new owner was going through the final stages of league approval and that the league expected the Mammoths to return for the 2020 season. However, the team was not mentioned again in any further press releases and was not included on the 2020 season schedule. The Mammoths have essentially folded and the trademarks were abandoned in 2020.

== Notable players ==
See Category:Maine Mammoths players
