= 2017 Green Bay Blizzard season =

Indoor Football League team season

- Owner: Larry Treankler; Kathy Treankler
- Head coach: Corey Roberson
- Home stadium: Resch Center

Results
- Record: 3–13
- Conference place: 4th
- Playoffs: Did not qualify

The 2017 Green Bay Blizzard season was the team's fifteenth season as a professional indoor football franchise and eighth in the Indoor Football League (IFL). One of ten teams that competed in the IFL for the 2017 season, the Blizzard were members of the United Conference.

Led by head coach Corey Roberson, the Blizzard played their home games at the Resch Center in the Green Bay suburb of Ashwaubenon, Wisconsin.

== Staff ==
2017 Green Bay Blizzard staff
Front office: Co-Owner – Larry Treankler; Co-Owner – Kathy Treankler; Director of sales – Ryan Hopson; Community Relations & Group Sales – Selena Cashman; Head coach: Head coach – Corey Roberson	Offensive coaches: Offensive coordinator – Matt Behrendt; Assistant coach – Nigel Stephens; Offensive line/defensive line – Dean Picotte; Special Teams Coordinator - Anthony Parker

== Schedule ==
Key: Win Tie Loss Bye

=== Regular season ===
All start times are local time

Week	Day	Date	Kickoff	Opponent	Results		Location	Attendance
Week	Day	Date	Kickoff	Opponent	Score	Record	Location	Attendance
1	Friday	February 17	7:05pm	at Cedar Rapids Titans	W 46–13	1–0	U.S. Cellular Center	3,176
2	Thursday	February 23	9:00pm	at Spokane Empire	L 31–34	1–1	Spokane Veterans Memorial Arena	5,072
3	BYE							
4	Sunday	March 12	3:05pm	Iowa Barnstormers	L 30-49	1-2	Resch Center	6,141
5	Sunday	March 19	3:05pm	at Cedar Rapids Titans	W 34-28	2-2	U.S. Cellular Center	2,874
6	Sunday	March 26	3:05pm	Arizona Rattlers	L 29–30	2–3	Resch Center	4,010
7	Saturday	April 1	7:05	Cedar Rapids Titans	L 37–41	2–4	Resch Center	5,841
8	Saturday	April 8	7:05pm	at Iowa Barnstormers	L 26–27	2–5	Wells Fargo Arena	6,028
9	Saturday	April 15	7:05pm	at Sioux Falls Storm	L 33–55	2–6	Denny Sanford Premier Center	
10	Saturday	April 22	7:05pm	Sioux Falls Storm	L 49–56	2–7	Resch Center	3,535
11	Saturday	April 29	8:05pm	at Arizona Rattlers	L 29–64	2–8	Talking Stick Resort Arena	13,006
12	Saturday	May 6	7:05pm	Iowa Barnstormers	L 34–41	2–9	Resch Center	
13	Saturday	May 13	7:05pm	Sioux Falls Storm	L 24–44	2–10	Resch Center	2,314
14	Saturday	May 20	7:05pm	at Nebraska Danger	L 25–41	2–11	Eihusen Arena	3,425
15	Friday	May 26	7:05pm	at Iowa Barnstormers	L 12–64	2–12	Wells Fargo Arena	8,377
16	Saturday	June 3	7:05pm	Wichita Falls Nighthawks	L 37–44	2–13	Resch Center	2,377
17	Saturday	June 10	7:05pm	Salt Lake Screaming Eagles	W 37–34	3–13	Resch Center	4,657
18	BYE							

==== Standings ====
2017 United Conference
	W	L	T	PCT	PF	PA	CON	GB	STK
y - Sioux Falls Storm	14	2	0	.875	769	467	9–2	—	W3
x - Iowa Barnstormers	13	3	0	.813	702	580	8–3	1.0	L1
Wichita Falls Nighthawks	12	4	0	.750	832	745	6–2	2.0	L1
Green Bay Blizzard	3	13	0	.188	513	665	2–9	11.5	W1
Cedar Rapids Titans	1	15	0	.063	494	780	1–10	13.0	L10

== Roster ==
2017 Green Bay Blizzard roster
Quarterbacks: 4 Greg McGhee; Running backs: 21 Darryan Ragsdale; Wide receivers: 17 Jack Bramswig; 15 Dorian Buford; 5 DeAndre Brown; 1 Jereme Jones; 12 Andre McDonald; 86 Marquel Willis	Offensive linemen: 74 Justin Bell; 50 Will Dancy; 55 Max Westphal; 77 Kenneth Woodget; Defensive linemen: 9 Giovani Francois; 99 Cory Grissom; 70 Pat McNeil; 42 Karmiah Yates	Linebackers: 34 Robert Metz; Defensive backs: 2 Manny Asprilla; 8 Jarred Evans; 13 Tyrell Pearson; 18 Keith Reynolds; 10 J. D. Roussel; 7 Kenny Veal; Special teams: 19 Jeff Budzein	Reserve lists: -- Patrick Arinze RB (IR); 16 Matt Behrendt QB (IR); 6 Derek Brim DB (IR); 69 Isaac Harris III OL (IR); -- Leon Hill OL (DNR); 22 Cortez Johnson DB (IR/DFR); 14 Jerome Junior DB (IR); -- Chris Malott WR (IR); 4 Karl Mickelsen LB (IR); 5 Jasen Oden Jr. RB (IR); -- Quentin Parks DL (IR); -- Sean Watson DL (IR); 97 Michael Wyche DL (Exempt); rookies in italics Roster updated June 7, 2017; 24 Active, 13 Inactive
