= Jamie Bender =

American football player (born 1990)

No. 7, 24
- Position: Defensive lineman

Personal information
- Born: February 26, 1990 (age 36); Laurel, Mississippi
- Listed height: 5 ft 11 in (1.80 m)
- Listed weight: 205 lb (93 kg)

Career information
- High school: Raleigh (MS)
- College: UAB
- NFL draft: 2012: undrafted

Career history
- Green Bay Blizzard (2015–2016); Nebraska Danger (2016); Cleveland Gladiators (2016); Iowa Barnstormers (2017); Richmond Roughriders (2018–?)

Awards and highlights
- Second Team All-IFL (2017); Second-team All-C-USA (2011)

Career AFL statistics
- Tackles: 6.5
- Pass breakup: 1
- Interceptions: 1
- Touchdowns: 1
- Stats at ArenaFan.com

Jamie Bender (born February 26, 1990) is an American former football defensive back. He played college football at University of Alabama at Birmingham and attended Raleigh High School in Raleigh, Mississippi. He was a member of the Green Bay Blizzard, Nebraska Danger, Cleveland Gladiators, Iowa Barnstormers and Richmond Roughriders.

== Early life ==
Bender attended Raleigh High School.

== College career ==
Bender played for the Jones County Junior College Bobcats from 2008 to 2009 and the UAB Blazers from 2010 to 2011.

== Professional career ==
Pre-draft measurables
Height	Weight	40-yard dash	10-yard split	20-yard split	20-yard shuttle	Three-cone drill	Vertical jump	Broad jump	Bench press
5 ft 10 in (1.78 m)	214 lb (97 kg)	4.54 s	1.59 s	2.65 s	4.26 s	7.07 s	34.5 in (0.88 m)	10 ft 9 in (3.28 m)	20 reps
All values from UAB Pro Day

=== Iowa Barnstormers ===
On October 25, 2016, Bender signed with the Iowa Barnstormers. Bender was named Second Team All-Indoor Football League at the conclusion of the regular season.

=== Richmond Roughriders ===
Bnder signed with the Richmond Roughriders in January 2018.
