= Shelby County High School (Alabama) =

Coordinates: 33°10′46″N 86°36′00″W

Location
- 101 Washington Street; Columbiana, Alabama 35051; United States

Information
- Type: Public
- Established: 1914 (112 years ago)
- CEEB code: 010750
- Principal: Kyle Dudley
- Teaching staff: 39.50 (FTE)
- Grades: 9-12
- Enrollment: 599 (2023-2024)
- Student to teacher ratio: 15.16
- Campus type: Suburban
- Colors: Cardinal and white
- Mascot: Wildcat
- Website: www.shelbyed.k12.al.us/o/schs

Shelby County High School is a secondary school located in the city of Columbiana in the U.S. state of Alabama. It is a part of Shelby County Schools.

== History ==
The school was founded in 1911, with the first class graduating in 1915.

== Athletics ==
Shelby County High School's athletic teams are known as the Wildcats, and their colors are maroon and white. Football games are played at Charles "PaPa" McCombs Stadium. Shelby County High School was a charter member of the Alabama High School Athletic Association, and currently plays in Class 5A. From 1961 to 1966, the football team won forty-five consecutive games, which is the sixth longest streak of most consecutive games without a loss in state history.

== Notable alumni ==
- Jason Aaron, comic book writer
- Robert J. Bentley, the 53rd Governor of Alabama graduated from SCHS in 1961.
- Kevin Guy, head coach for the Arizona Rattlers of the Arena Football League and the Indoor Football League
- Howard Hill, professional archer and actor
