= Salt Lake Screaming Eagles =

Former indoor football team in West Valley City, Utah, United States

Logo

General information
- Founded: 2016
- Folded: 2017
- Headquartered: Maverik Center in West Valley City, Utah
- Colors: Navy blue, red, white
- SaltLakeScreamingEagles.com

Personnel
- Owner: Project Fanchise
- Head coach: Matthew Sauk
- President: Thom Carter

Team history
- Salt Lake Screaming Eagles (2017)

Home fields
- Maverik Center (2017)

League / conference affiliations
- Indoor Football League (2017): Intense Conference (2017)

The Salt Lake Screaming Eagles were a professional indoor football team based in West Valley City, Utah, near Salt Lake City. The Screaming Eagles started as an expansion team in the Indoor Football League (IFL) and began play in 2017 with home games at the Maverik Center. The team folded when ownership left the IFL to start their own league.

== History ==
The team was announced in April 2016 by a group called Project FANchise with the intent on creating an entirely fan operated indoor football team. The project announced that fans would vote on every aspect of the team including the name of the team, signing players, and calling plays. On June 6, the name of the team was announced as the Screaming Eagles after the 101st Airborne Division. The name was picked over the more controversial choices of "Teamy McTeamface," "Sandtroopers," and "Stormin' Mormons." William McCarthy was voted in as the first head coach in franchise history.

The team made their debut at home against the Nebraska Danger on February 16, 2017. They lost 78–47 in a game which featured the fans storming the field after the Eagles scored the first fan-called touchdown in franchise history. Also, the team introduced their part-owner, Norm Macdonald, who helped call part of the game streamed live on SI.com (Sports Illustrated) and YouTube. The team won their first game the next week defeating the Colorado Crush 42–41 on February 26. On March 1, the team then fired head coach William McCarthy due to philosophical differences and then hired Matthew Sauk as its new head coach without using the fan vote system. However, the FANchise vote system made national news once again when their fans voted against signing former NFL player Greg Hardy on March 30, 2017.

On April 20, 2017, The Wall Street Journal reported that Project FANchise was planning on launching a new league called the "Interactive Football League". Project FANchise CEO Sohrob Farudi confirmed that the Screaming Eagles would finish the 2017 Indoor Football League season and would be leaving the league afterwards. The league was later re-branded as the Electronic Football League (eFL) in October 2017 and then as the Fan Controlled Football League (FCFL) in November 2017. The new league planned to play all of its games in only one city with eight new teams and the Screaming Eagles did not appear to be one the team names considered. The new league eventually began play in February 2021 as Fan Controlled Football with four teams.

== Statistics and records ==
=== Season-by-season results ===
League champions	Conference champions	Division champions	Playoff berth	League leader

Season	Team	League	Conference	Division	Regular season			Postseason results
Season	Team	League	Conference	Division	Finish	Wins	Losses	Postseason results
2017	2017	IFL	Intense		4th	5	11	

=== Head coach records ===
Name	Term	Regular season			Playoffs		Awards
Name	Term	W	L	Win%	W	L	Awards
William McCarthy	2017	1	1	.500	0	0	
Matthew Sauk	2017	4	10	.286	0	0	

== Personnel ==
=== Final roster ===
2017 Salt Lake Screaming Eagles roster
Quarterbacks: 1 Verlon Reed; Running backs: 17 Bubba Poole; 16 Lucien Walker; Wide receivers: 14 Dorian Buford; 21 Juwan Dotson; 8 Delric Ellington; 84 Devin Mahina; 7 Chris Robinson; 10 Dontrelle Sanford; 11 Tanqueray Towns	Offensive linemen: 92 Siaosi Aiono; 99 Zach Fondal; 52 Royce Roxas; Defensive linemen: 75 Quinton Bradley; 97 Viliseni Fauonuku; 53 Sisale Hautau; 52 Michael Ward; 93 Seante Williams	Linebackers: 25 Jerome McElroy; 9 Gionni Paul; Defensive backs: 6 Ed Burns; 11 James Calhoun; 12 Rashard Greene; 14 Kelvin Lee; 3 Don Unamba; Special teams: 13 Scott Thomsen	Reserve lists: 2 Breon Allen RB (IR); 10 Trent Andrus K (IR); 99 David Gilbert DL (IR); 52 Ofa Hautau DL (IR); 51 Alex Land OL (Exempt); 10 Derwyn Lauderdale WR (IR); -- Lene Maiava OL (Exempt); 15 Gianni Olivas DB (IR); 9 Devon Price WR (IR); 5 Jesse Scroggins QB (IR); 13 Cy Strahm WR (IR); rookies in italics; Roster updated June 13, 2017; 25 Active, 12 Inactive; → More rosters

=== All-League selections ===
- WR Devin Mahina
- DB James Calhoun

=== Individual awards ===
Offensive Rookie of the Year
Season	Player	Position
2017	Verlon Reed	QB

=== Staff ===
Salt Lake Screaming Eagles staff
Front office: Majority owner – Project FANchise; President – Thom Carter	Head coach: Head coach – Matthew Sauk; Assistant to the head coach – Ron McBride; Offensive coaches: Offensive coordinator – The Fans; Offensive line coach – Jaren Skinner; Defensive coaches: co-Defensive Coordinator – Sergio Gilliam; co-Defensive Coordinator – Kevin Bello

== 2017 season ==
2017 Salt Lake Screaming Eagles season
- Owner: Project FANchise
- Head coach: William McCarthy (2 games); Matthew Sauk
- Home stadium: Maverik Center

Results
- Record: 5–11
- Conference place: 5th
- Playoffs: Did not qualify

=== Schedule ===
Key: Win Tie Loss Bye

Week	Day	Date	Kickoff	Opponent	Results		Location	Attendance
Week	Day	Date	Kickoff	Opponent	Score	Record	Location	Attendance
1	Thursday	February 16	7:00pm	Nebraska Danger	L 47–78	0–1	Maverik Center	8,191
2	Sunday	February 26	3:00pm	at Colorado Crush	W 42–41 (OT)	1–1	Budweiser Events Center	
3	BYE							
4	Monday	March 13	7:00pm	Spokane Empire	L 35–41	1–2	Maverik Center	4,196
5	BYE							
6	Friday	March 24	7:00pm	at Spokane Empire	L 36–53	1–3	Spokane Veterans Memorial Arena	
7	Friday	March 31	7:00pm	Colorado Crush	L 49–52	1–4	Maverik Center	4,121
8	Saturday	April 8	7:05pm	at Wichita Falls Nighthawks	L 33–39	1–5	Kay Yeager Coliseum	
9	Friday	April 14	7:00pm	Arizona Rattlers	L 60–73	1–6	Maverik Center	3,785
10	Saturday	April 22	7:05pm	at Nebraska Danger	L 30–49	1–7	Eihusen Arena	
11	Sunday	April 30	3:00pm	at Spokane Empire	L 29–31	1–8	Spokane Veterans Memorial Arena	
12	Sunday	May 7	4:30pm	at Colorado Crush	W 64–41	2–8	Budweiser Events Center	
13	Friday	May 12	7:00pm	Colorado Crush	W 38–37	3–8	Maverik Center	4,855
14	Saturday	May 20	7:00pm	at Arizona Rattlers	L 33–63	3–9	Talking Stick Resort Arena	
15	Monday	May 29	7:00pm	Cedar Rapids Titans	W 64–27	4–9	Maverik Center	2,981
16	Friday	June 2	7:00pm	Iowa Barnstormers	L 36–58	4–10	Maverik Center	3,873
17	Saturday	June 10	7:05pm	at Green Bay Blizzard	L 34–37	4–11	Resch Center	4,657
18	Friday	June 16	7:00pm	Spokane Empire	W 45–42	5–11	Maverik Center	4,581

=== Standings ===
2017 Intense Conference
	W	L	T	PCT	PF	PA	CON	GB	STK
y - Arizona Rattlers	12	4	0	.750	782	610	8–1	—	W8
x - Nebraska Danger	9	7	0	.563	717	660	5–2	3.0	W1
Spokane Empire	8	8	0	.500	654	677	7–5	4.0	L3
Salt Lake Screaming Eagles	5	11	0	.313	675	762	4–8	7.0	W1
Colorado Crush	3	13	0	.188	629	821	2–10	8.0	L4
