= Damond Powell =

American gridiron football player (born 1992)

No. 9
- Position: Wide receiver

Personal information
- Born: October 31, 1992 (age 34); Toledo, Ohio, U.S.
- Listed height: 5 ft 11 in (1.80 m)
- Listed weight: 181 lb (82 kg)

Career information
- High school: Toledo (OH) Rogers
- College: Iowa
- NFL draft: 2015: undrafted

Career history
- Arizona Cardinals (2015); Cedar Rapids Titans (2017); Sioux Falls Storm (2018–2020); Montreal Alouettes (2018)*; Philadelphia Soul (2019); Tucson Sugar Skulls (2021); Sioux City Bandits (2022)
- * Offseason or practice squad member only

Awards and highlights
- First-team All-IFL (2017)
- Stats at Pro Football Reference

Damond Powell Jr. (born October 31, 1992) is an American former professional football wide receiver. He was signed as an undrafted free agent by the Arizona Cardinals after the 2015 NFL Draft. He played college football at Iowa.

== Professional career ==
=== Arizona Cardinals ===
On May 5, 2015, Powell signed to the Arizona Cardinals as an undrafted free agent On July 29, 2015, Powell was placed on the reserve/non football injury list after being shot in the face. On March 10, 2016, he was released.

=== Cedar Rapids Titans ===
On January 31, 2017, Powell signed with the Cedar Rapids Titans of the Indoor Football League (IFL). Powell was named First Team All-Indoor Football League at the conclusion of the 2017 season.

=== Sioux Falls Storm ===
On May 29, 2018, Powell signed with the Sioux Falls Storm of the IFL. After his stint with the Sioux Falls Storm he got signed to the practice squad of the Montreal Alouettes of the Canadian Football League.

=== Philadelphia Soul ===
Powell was assigned to the Philadelphia Soul of the Arena Football League on May 30, 2019.

=== Tucson Sugar Skulls ===
On July 27, 2021, Powell signed with the Tucson Sugar Skulls of the IFL.

== Personal life ==
On July 25, 2015, Powell was wounded by gunfire outside his Ohio home and was hospitalized. He was shot in the jaw and the neck.
