= Wichita Falls Nighthawks =

Logo

General information
- Founded: 2012
- Folded: 2017
- Headquartered: Kay Yeager Coliseum in Wichita Falls, Texas
- Colors: Black, gold, silver, white
- Mascot: Swoop
- WFNighthawks.com

Personnel
- Owner: Drew Carnes
- Head coach: Billy Back
- President: Drew Carnes

Team history
- Wichita Falls Nighthawks (2012–2017)

Home fields
- Kay Yeager Coliseum (2015–2017)

League / conference affiliations
- Professional American Football League (2013); Gridiron Developmental Football League (2014); Indoor Football League (2015–2017); United Conference (2015–2017)

Championships
- League championships: 1: PAFL: 2013

Playoff appearances (1)
- IFL: 2016

The Wichita Falls Nighthawks were a professional indoor American football team. They were based in Wichita Falls, Texas. The team was headquartered in Wichita Falls and played its home games at Kay Yeager Coliseum. The Nighthawks first joined the Indoor Football League as an expansion team in 2015. The Nighthawks were announced as a member of Champions Indoor Football (CIF) for 2018, however, due to litigation, the team ceased operations for the season.

The franchise started as an outdoor American football team that played in different minor leagues before joining the IFL. Their outdoor home was Memorial Stadium in Wichita Falls.

== History ==
The Nighthawks were founded in October 2012 as a minor league outdoor football team by Jerry and Michelle Hughes. They played in the Professional American Football League in 2013 and won the championship. They played in the Gridiron Developmental Football League in 2014 but forfeited the season early due to financial struggles. Hughes sold the team to Drew Carnes in the summer of 2014. Carnes' intention was to turn the franchise into an indoor football team. On August 25, 2014, the Nighthawks became official members of the Indoor Football League, the top indoor league in the country alongside the Arena Football League. On August 26, 2015, James Kerwin was released as the Nighthawks head coach after posting a 4-10 record his first season with the team.

On October 2, 2015, the Nighthawks officially announced that they had hired Billy Back to replace Kerwin. Back had previously been the head coach for the Nashville Venom, where he guided the Venom to a 2014 Professional Indoor Football League championship. Back helped the Nighthawks highest scoring offense in the IFL and an 11–5 record and their first ever indoor football playoff appearance. The Nighthawks lost their first playoff game 36–66 to the Cedar Rapids Titans.

The Nighthawks repeated as the highest scoring offense in the IFL, but with the removal of wildcards from the playoffs, the Nighthawks missed the playoffs. After the 2017 IFL season, owner Drew Carnes applied for membership in Champions Indoor Football in order to lower travel costs and league instability. Carnes had been losing $250,000 each of the previous two seasons with their closest travel game being eight hours away in Grand Island, Nebraska.

On September 12, 2017, the Nighthawks announced that they had joined the CIF and signed a new three-year lease with the Yeager Coliseum. However, in October, the IFL notified the Nighthawks and the CIF of pending litigation against them for their withdrawal from the IFL. The CIF responded by stating they could not schedule the Nighthawks for 2018, leaving the Nighthawks league affiliation undetermined. With the operational costs too high to return to the IFL and the lawsuit preventing them from playing in the CIF, the Nighthawks ceased operations.

== Players ==
=== All-League selections ===
- QB Charles McCullum (2)
- RB Tyler Williams (2)
- WR Jordan Jolly (2)
- DL Terrance Lloyd, Walter Thomas (2)
- LB/DB James Ackel
- K Rockne Belmonte (2)
- KR Tyler Williams

=== Individual awards ===
Most Valuable Player
Season	Player	Position
2016	Charles McCullum	QB
2017	Charles McCullum	QB

Offensive Player of the Year
Season	Player	Position
2017	Charles McCullum	QB

Special Teams Player of the Year
Season	Player	Position
2017	Tyler Williams	KR

== Statistics and records ==
=== Season-by-season results ===
League champions	Conference champions	Division champions	Playoff berth	League leader

Season	Team	League	Conference	Division	Regular season				Postseason results
Season	Team	League	Conference	Division	Finish	Wins	Losses	Ties	Postseason results
2015	2015	IFL	Intense		5th	4	10	0	
2016	2016	IFL	United		3rd	11	5	0	Lost United Conference Wild Card 66–36 vs. Cedar Rapids
2017	2017	IFL	United		3rd	12	4	0	
Totals						27	19	0	All-time regular season record (2015–2017)
Totals						0	1	—	All-time postseason record (2015–2017)
Totals						27	20	0	All-time regular season and postseason record (2015–2017)

=== Head coach records ===
Name	Term	Regular season				Playoffs		Awards
Name	Term	W	L	T	Win%	W	L	Awards
James Kerwin	2015	4	10	0	.286	0	0	
Billy Back	2016–2017	23	9	0	.719	0	1	IFL Coach of the Year (2016)
