= 2017 Indoor Football League season =

2017 IFL season
- League: Indoor Football League
- Sport: Indoor Football
- Duration: February 16, 2017 – June 17, 2017
- Teams: 10

Regular season
- Season MVP: Charles McCullum (Wichita Falls Nighthawks)

Playoffs
- Intense champions: Arizona Rattlers
- Intense runners-up: Nebraska Danger
- United champions: Sioux Falls Storm
- United runners-up: Iowa Barnstormers

2017 United Bowl
- Champions: Arizona Rattlers
- Runners-up: Sioux Falls Storm
- Finals MVP: Justin Shirk (LB, ARI)

IFL seasons
- ← 2016 2018 →

The 2017 Indoor Football League season was the ninth season of the Indoor Football League (IFL). Playing with ten teams in two conferences spread across the midwestern and western United States, the league's regular season kicked off on February 16, 2017, when the Salt Lake Screaming Eagles hosted the Nebraska Danger. The regular season ended 18 weeks later on June 18, 2017, with the defending league champion Sioux Falls Storm visiting the Iowa Barnstormers and the Wichita Falls Nighthawks visiting the Nebraska Danger. The playoffs were held in two rounds, with the top two seeds in each conference playing against each other in the conference championships. The winner of those games met in the United Bowl.

== Teams ==
For 2017, the IFL maintained its two-conference, no-divisions format, with each of the ten teams playing 16 games during the 18-week regular season. The Billings Wolves and Tri-Cities Fever announced their suspension of operations for the 2017 season, maintaining hope of a return for 2018. In their place, the Salt Lake Screaming Eagles (owned by Project FANchise, with fans controlling every aspect of the team) were accepted into the IFL as an expansion team, and the Arizona Rattlers joined the IFL after having played the last 24 seasons in the Arena Football League.

| Team | Location | Arena | Capacity | Founded | Joined | Head coach |
United Conference
| Cedar Rapids Titans | Cedar Rapids, Iowa | U.S. Cellular Center | 6,900 | 2012 | 2012 | Marvin McNutt |
| Green Bay Blizzard | Green Bay, Wisconsin | Resch Center | 8,600 | 2003 | 2010 | Chris Williams |
| Iowa Barnstormers | Des Moines, Iowa | Wells Fargo Arena | 15,181 | 1995 | 2015 | Dixie Wooten |
| Sioux Falls Storm | Sioux Falls, South Dakota | Denny Sanford Premier Center | 10,678 | 2000 | 2009 | Kurtiss Riggs |
| Wichita Falls Nighthawks | Wichita Falls, Texas | Kay Yeager Coliseum | 7,380 | 2013 | 2015 | Billy Back |
Intense Conference
| Arizona Rattlers | Phoenix, Arizona | Talking Stick Resort Arena | 15,505 | 1992 | 2017 | Kevin Guy |
| Colorado Crush | Loveland, Colorado | Budweiser Events Center | 5,289 | 2007 | 2009 | Jose Jefferson |
| Nebraska Danger | Grand Island, Nebraska | Eihusen Arena | 6,000 | 2011 | 2011 | Hurtis Chinn |
| Salt Lake Screaming Eagles | West Valley City, Utah | Maverik Center | 10,000 | 2016 | 2017 | Matthew Sauk |
| Spokane Empire | Spokane, Washington | Spokane Veterans Memorial Arena | 10,771 | 2006 | 2016 | Adam Shackleford |

== Standings ==
2017 Intense Conference
| | W | L | T | PCT | PF | PA | CON | GB | STK |
|---|---|---|---|---|---|---|---|---|---|
| y - Arizona Rattlers | 12 | 4 | 0 | .750 | 782 | 610 | 8–1 | — | W8 |
| x - Nebraska Danger | 9 | 7 | 0 | .563 | 717 | 660 | 5–2 | 3.0 | W1 |
| Spokane Empire | 8 | 8 | 0 | .500 | 654 | 677 | 7–5 | 4.0 | L3 |
| Salt Lake Screaming Eagles | 5 | 11 | 0 | .313 | 675 | 762 | 4–8 | 7.0 | W1 |
| Colorado Crush | 3 | 13 | 0 | .188 | 629 | 821 | 2–10 | 8.0 | L4 |

2017 United Conference
| | W | L | T | PCT | PF | PA | CON | GB | STK |
|---|---|---|---|---|---|---|---|---|---|
| y - Sioux Falls Storm | 14 | 2 | 0 | .875 | 769 | 467 | 9–2 | — | W3 |
| x - Iowa Barnstormers | 13 | 3 | 0 | .813 | 702 | 580 | 8–3 | 1.0 | L1 |
| Wichita Falls Nighthawks | 12 | 4 | 0 | .750 | 832 | 745 | 6–2 | 2.0 | L1 |
| Green Bay Blizzard | 3 | 13 | 0 | .188 | 513 | 665 | 2–9 | 11.5 | W1 |
| Cedar Rapids Titans | 1 | 15 | 0 | .063 | 494 | 780 | 1–10 | 13.0 | L10 |

== Playoffs ==
Semifinals
I2 | Nebraska | 36
I1 | Arizona | 62
U2 | Iowa | 32
U1 | Sioux Falls | 66

2017 United Bowl
I1 | Arizona | 50
U1 | Sioux Falls | 41

== Awards ==
=== Players of the week ===
The following were named the top performers during the 2017 season:

| Week | Offensive Player of the Week | Defensive Player of the Week | Special Teams Player of the Week |
|---|---|---|---|
| 1 | Charles McCullum (Nighthawks) | Rashard Smith (Storm) | Trey Wafford (Danger) |
| 2 | Verlon Reed (Screaming Eagles) | Robert Brown (Empire) | Tyler Williams (Nighthawks) |
| 3 | Derrick Bernard (Danger) | Tyree Robinson (Empire) | Tanner Graeber (Nighthawks) |
| 4 | Trevor Kennedy (Empire) | Javicz Jones (Barnstormers) | Jamal Miles (Rattlers) |
| 5 | Charles Dowdell (Empire) | Manny Asprilla (Blizzard) | Carlton Watkins (Storm) |
| 6 | Mike Tatum (Storm) | John Hardy-Tuliau (Empire) | Joshua Gable (Danger) |
| 7 | Charles McCullum (Nighthawks) | Nikolas Sierra (Danger) | Spencer Groner (Crush) |
| 8 | Cody Sokol (Rattlers) | Javicz Jones (Barnstormers) | Justin Syrovatka (Storm) |
| 9 | Darrell Monroe (Rattlers) | DaeJohn Love (Barnstormers) | Marcus Barnett (Titans) |
| 10 | Liam Nadler (Crush) | Eze Obiora (Danger) | Trevor Kennedy (Empire) |
| 11 | Darrell Monroe (Rattlers) | James Calhoun (Screaming Eagles) | Tyler Williams (Nighthawks) |
| 12 | Travis Partridge (Barnstormers) | Tyler Knight (Storm) | Tyrell Pearson (Blizzard) |
| 13 | Tre' Parmalee (Titans) | Khalif Mitchell (Storm) | Sawyer Petre (Rattlers) |
| 14 | Travis Partridge (Barnstormers) | Justin Shirk (Rattlers) | Chris Robinson (Screaming Eagles) |
| 15 | Brady Roland (Barnstormers) | James Calhoun (Screaming Eagles) | Rockne Belmonte (Nighthawks) |
| 16 | Drew Powell (Danger) | Jamie Bender (Barnstormers) | Tyler Williams (Nighthawks) |
| 17 | Brady Roland (Barnstormers) | Allen Chapman (Rattlers) | Miles Bergner (Crush) |
| 18 | Drew Powell (Danger) | Rashard Smith (Storm) | Miles Bergner (Crush) |

=== Individual season awards ===
| Award | Winner | Position | Team |
|---|---|---|---|
| Most Valuable Player | Charles McCullum | Quarterback | Wichita Falls Nighthawks |
| Offensive Player of the Year | Charles McCullum | Quarterback | Wichita Falls Nighthawks |
| Defensive Player of the Year | Javicz Jones | Linebacker | Iowa Barnstormers |
| Special Teams Player of the Year | Tyler Williams | Kick returner | Wichita Falls Nighthawks |
| Offensive Rookie of the Year | Verlon Reed | Quarterback | Salt Lake Screaming Eagles |
| Defensive Rookie of the Year | Trey Wafford | Defensive back | Nebraska Danger |
| Most Improved Award | Travis Partridge | Quarterback | Iowa Barnstormers |
| Adam Pringle Award | Jack Bramswig | Wide receiver | Green Bay Blizzard |
| Coach of the Year | Dixie Wooten | Head coach | Iowa Barnstormers |

=== 1st Team All-IFL ===
Offense
| Quarterback | Charles McCullum, Wichita Falls |
| Running back | Darrell Monroe, Arizona |
| Wide receiver | Jordan Jolly, Wichita Falls; Brady Roland, Iowa; Damond Powell, Cedar Rapids |
| Offensive tackle | Darius Savage, Nebraska; Lamar Mady, Arizona |
| Center | Rashad Mungro, Sioux Falls |

Defense
| Defensive line | J. D. Griggs, Spokane; Ra'Shawde Myers, Iowa; Chris McAllister, Arizona |
| Linebacker | Javicz Jones, Iowa |
| Defensive back | Trey Wafford, Nebraska; Allen Chapman, Arizona; Rashard Smith, Sioux Falls; James Calhoun, Salt Lake |

Special teams
| Kicker | Rockne Belmonte, Wichita Falls |
| Kick returner | Tyler Williams, Wichita Falls |

=== 2nd Team All-IFL ===
Offense
| Quarterback | Travis Partridge, Iowa |
| Running back | Tyler Williams, Wichita Falls |
| Wide receiver | Kyle Kaizer, Colorado; Devin Mahina, Salt Lake; Marquel Willis, Green Bay |
| Offensive tackle | Kyle Bryant, Sioux Falls; D'Angelo McCray, Iowa |
| Center | Damian Love, Arizona |

Defense
| Defensive end | Eze Obiora, Nebraska; Claude Davis, Sioux Falls; Walter Thomas, Wichita Falls |
| Linebacker | Tyler Knight, Sioux Falls |
| Defensive back | Jamie Bender, Iowa; Matt Hermanson, Sioux Falls; John Hardy-Tuliau, Spokane; Manny Asprilla, Green Bay |

Special teams
| Kicker | Sawyer Petre, Arizona |
| Kick returner | Daniel Lindsey, Colorado |

== See also ==
- 2017 National Arena League season
