= Maverik Center =

Multi-purpose indoor arena in West Valley City, Utah, US

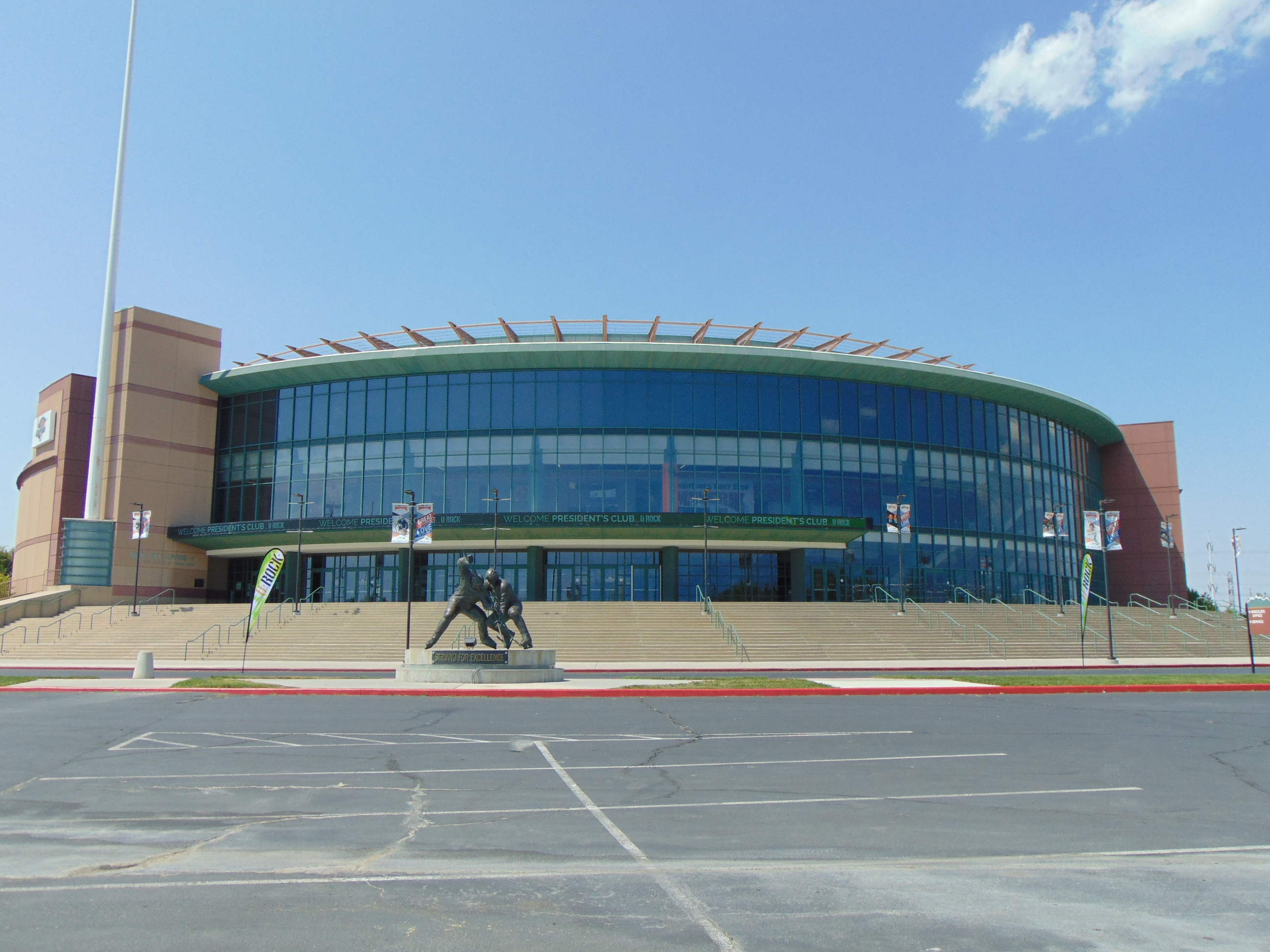
- The arena in 2017

- Location within Utah Location within the United States
- Former names: E Center (1997–2010)
- Address: 3200 South Decker Lake Drive
- Location: West Valley City, Utah, U.S.
- Coordinates: 40°42′9.8″N 111°57′1.5″W
- Owner: City of West Valley City
- Operator: Centennial Management Group, Inc.
- Capacity: Ice hockey: 10,100; Basketball: 12,500; Concerts: up to 12,000; Boxing; Wrestling: 12,600

Construction
- Groundbreaking: March 22, 1996
- Opened: September 22, 1997
- Cost: US$54.1 million ($109 million in 2025 dollars)
- Architects: HOK Sport; Valentiner, Crane, Brunjes, Onyon
- Structural engineers: Reaveley Engineers & Associates Inc.
- Services engineer: Colvin Engineering Associates
- General contractor: Turner Construction

Tenants
- Utah Grizzlies (IHL/AHL) 1997–2005; Utah Freezz (WISL) 1999–2001; Utah Warriors (NIFL) 2003–2004; Utah Grizzlies (ECHL) 2005–2026; Utah Blaze (AFL) 2010; Salt Lake Screaming Eagles (IFL) 2017; Salt Lake City Stars (NBAGL) 2022–present Utah Great 8's (IAL) 2026

Website
- maverikcenter.com

Maverik Center, originally known as the E Center, is a 12,600-seat multi-purpose indoor arena located in West Valley City, Utah, United States. Construction on the arena started in 1996 and was completed in time to hold its first event (a live airing of WCW Monday Nitro) on September 22, 1997. The arena is owned by West Valley City, and managed by Centennial Management Group.

During the 2002 Winter Olympics it served as the main venue for the ice hockey events, and as the venue for ice sledge hockey during the 2002 Winter Paralympics.

As of 2025, the arena is home to the Salt Lake City Stars of the NBA G League and was the home of the Utah Grizzlies of the ECHL from 2005 to 2026. It is also a major venue in the area for numerous concerts and live touring productions.

== History ==
In July 1995, only a month after winning the 2002 Winter Olympic bid, the Salt Lake Organizing Committee (SLOC) accepted a proposal from West Valley City to build a new ice hockey facility in their city. SLOC loaned $7 million to the city for construction costs, and would rent the arena from the city during the Olympic Games. The arena would be funded through a variety of ways, but would be owned by the municipality of West Valley City, and used for various events before and after the games. Ground was broken for the arena on March 22, 1996, and construction was completed in September 1997; the E Center was officially dedicated in a ceremony on September 19, 1997. The first event held in the new venue was a live episode of WCW Monday Nitro on September 22, 1997, notable for being the in-ring debut of Bill Goldberg.

=== Naming rights ===
In 2010, Centennial Management Group and West Valley City, announced that a new partnership (which included naming rights) had been reached with Maverik, Inc., owners of convenience stores throughout the Intermountain West. The sponsorship deal is a multi-year agreement, which included exclusive sponsorship and advertising rights, prominent signage on the exterior and interior of the building, along with a name change to the Maverik Center. Additionally, the venue now features Maverik's proprietary "adventure theme", a Maverik concession outlet, and exclusively sells a number of Maverik proprietary products.

== Tenants ==
=== Present ===
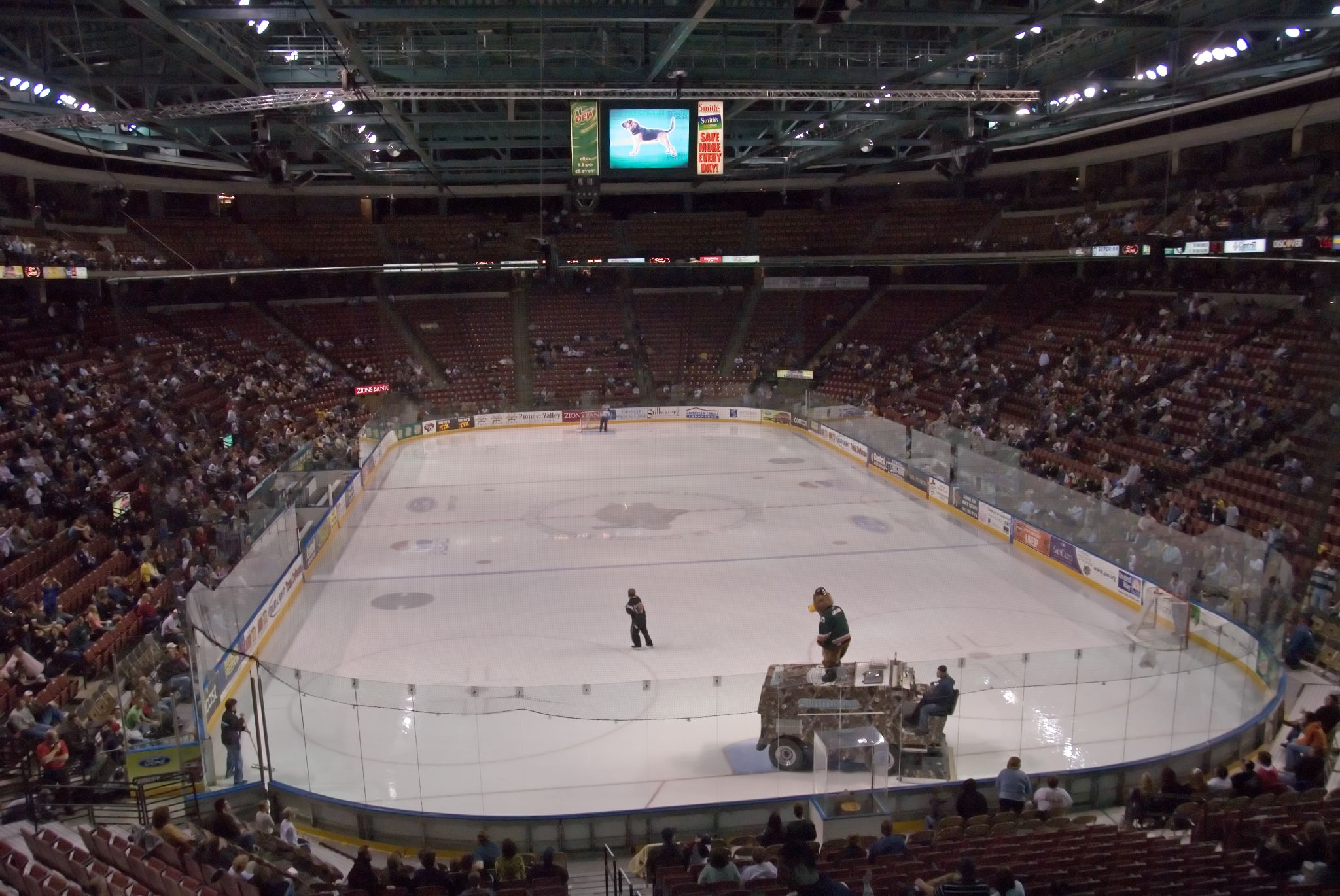
Grizzlies game at the arena

The venue's primary tenants are the Salt Lake City Stars of the NBA G League. The Utah Grizzlies of the ECHL played at the arena from 2005 to 2026, when they replaced an earlier Grizzlies franchise that was a member of the American Hockey League (AHL). The Stars, the NBA G League affiliate of the Utah Jazz, moved to the arena in 2022 after having previously played their home games at the Lifetime Activities Center on the campus of Salt Lake Community College in Taylorsville.

In 2026 it was announced that arena football will be returning to the center in April of that year with the Utah Great8s of the International Arena League.

=== Winter Olympics and Paralympics ===
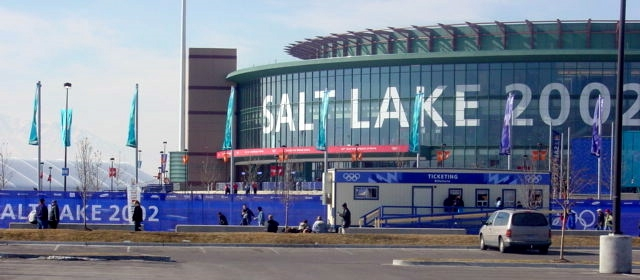
Maverik Center during the 2002 Winter Olympics.

The arena served as one of the venues for ice hockey during the 2002 games, with events spread out during six days in 31 sessions. The indoor facility was capable of holding 8,400 spectators, plus press members, during the competitions. 96.7% of available tickets were sold, for a total of 230,657 spectators witnessing events in the arena. During the 2002 Winter Paralympics, the arena hosted the sled hockey tournament.

In July 2024, Salt Lake City–Utah were awarded the 2034 Winter Olympics. Maverik Center is expected to host figure skating and short track speed skating.

== Concerts ==
Prince performed October 4, 1997, during the inaugural concert at the E-Center, now called the Maverik Center in West Valley City. As part of their performance at the arena on November 2, 1998, Phish performed Pink Floyd's The Dark Side of the Moon album in its entirety. Depeche Mode performed at the arena three times: the first one was on July 23, 2001, during their Exciter Tour. The second one was on November 12, 2005, during their Touring the Angel. The third one was on August 25, 2009, during their Tour of the Universe, in front of a crowd of 6,601 people. The 2009 show was recorded for the group's live albums project Recording the Universe. One Direction and Sam Smith performed in the arena in 2013 and 2015 respectively.
