= Kay Yeager Coliseum =

Arena in Wichita Falls, Texas

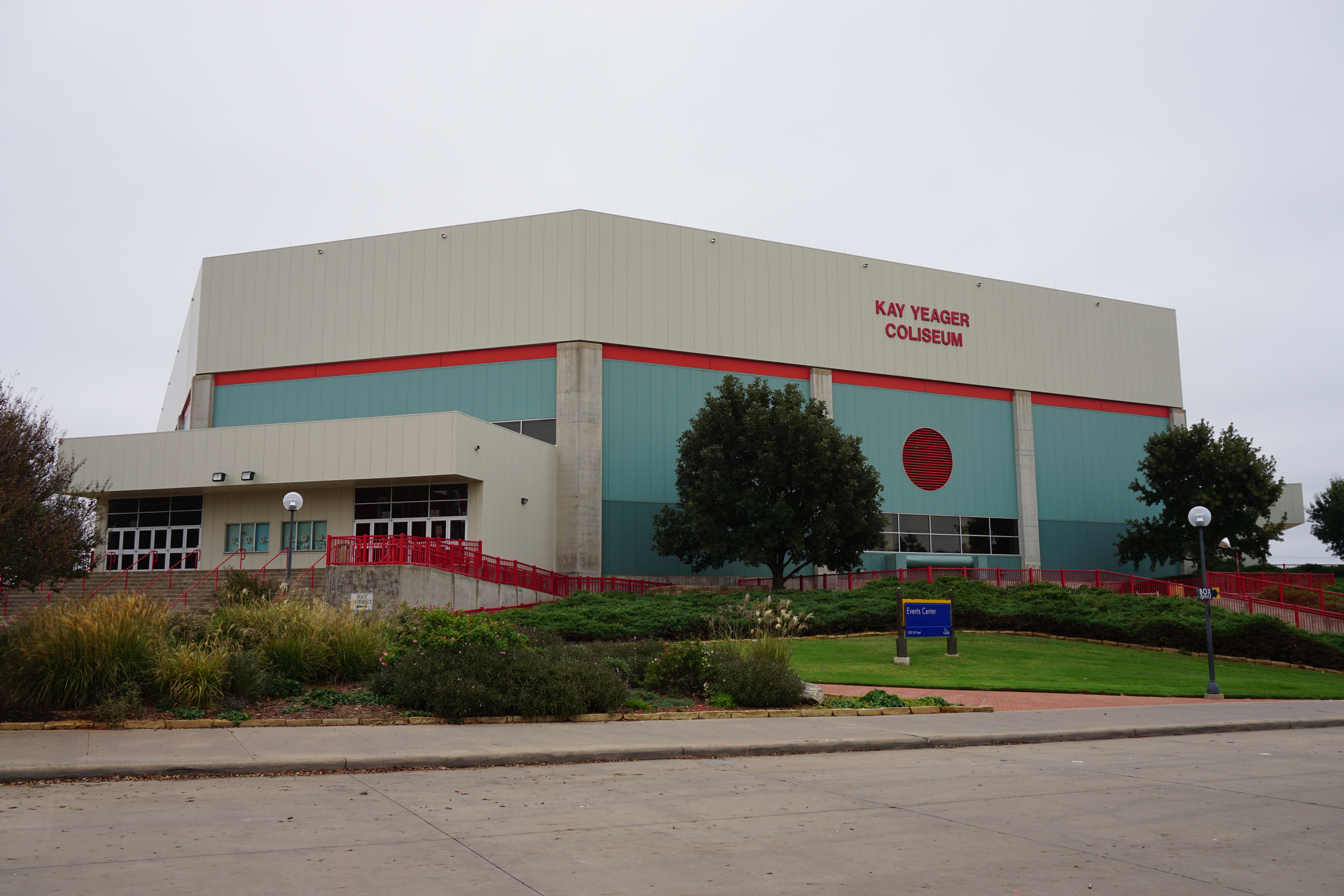
- The Kay Yeager Coliseum in October 2015
- Interactive map of Kay Yeager Coliseum
- Address: 1000 5th Street; Wichita Falls, TX 76301
- Coordinates: 33°54′57″N 98°29′51″W
- Owner: City of Wichita Falls
- Operator: Spectra Experiences
- Capacity: 7,380

Construction
- Groundbreaking: 2001
- Opened: January 3, 2003
- Cost: $18.969 million ($33.2 million in 2025 dollars)
- Architects: Bundy, Young, Sims & Potter, Inc. Wingler & Sharp Architects & Planners, Inc. Douglas Seidel Architects

Tenants
- Wichita Falls Wildcats (NAHL) (2004–2017); Wichita Falls Nighthawks (IFL) (2015–2017); Wichita Falls Warriors (NAHL) (2020–2022); Wichita Falls Netburners (ABA) (2026-future)

The Kay Yeager Coliseum is a 7,380-seat multi-purpose arena in Wichita Falls, Texas. It was completed in 2003. Kay Yeager served as Wichita Falls mayor from May 1996 to May 2000.

It was previously home to the Wichita Falls Wildcats junior ice hockey team from 2004 to 2017. It was also home to the Wichita Falls Nighthawks of the Indoor Football League and briefly the Wichita Falls Force of the USA Central Hockey League.

In 2019, the arena's added the Wichita Falls Flyers FC of the US Arena Pro Soccer League. In 2020, the arena gained another North American Hockey League expansion team called the Wichita Falls Warriors.
