= Drew Powell (American football) =

American football player (born 1993)

Arizona Rattlers
- Position: Quarterback
- Roster status: Active

Personal information
- Born: September 26, 1993 (age 33); Upper Marlboro, Maryland, U.S.
- Listed height: 6 ft 2 in (1.88 m)
- Listed weight: 220 lb (100 kg)

Career information
- High school: Wakefield (Arlington County, VA)
- College: Livingstone (2012–2015)
- NFL draft: 2016: undrafted

Career history
- Sydney Express (2016)*; Sioux Falls Storm (2017); Nebraska Danger (2017); Iowa Barnstormers (2018); Saskatchewan Roughriders (2018)*; Iowa Barnstormers (2018); Saskatchewan Roughriders (2018)*; Atlantic City Blackjacks (2019)*; Arizona Rattlers (2019–2022); Edmonton Elks (2022)*; Arizona Rattlers (2023); Tucson Sugar Skulls (2024)*; Orlando Predators (2024); Arizona Rattlers (2025–present)
- * Offseason or practice squad member only

Awards and highlights
- United Bowl champion (2018); 3× IFL MVP (2018, 2021, 2022); IFL Offensive Player of the Year (2023); 2× First-team All-IFL (2018, 2022); 2× Second-team All-IFL (2021, 2023); CIAA Offensive Player of the Year (2015); CIAA Offensive Rookie of the Year (2012); 2× First-team All-CIAA (2014, 2015); CIAA All-Rookie Team (2012); Euro-American Challenge MVP (2015)

Drew Powell (born September 26, 1993) is an American professional indoor football quarterback for the Arizona Rattlers of the Indoor Football League (IFL). He played college football for Livingstone College.

== Early life ==
Powell was born on September 26, 1993, in Upper Marlboro, Maryland. He went to high school at Wakefield High School in Arlington County, Virginia. In his senior season, he passed for 1,867 yards, rushed for 676, and had 39 return yards. He also had nine receiving touchdowns. He was named the 2011 Sun Gazette's Offensive Player of the Year. On February 2, 2012, Powell committed to Virginia State University. Powell then de-committed from VSU and committed to Livingstone College.

== College career ==
=== 2012 season ===
Powell immediately earned the starting job in his first season at Livingstone. He then passed for 343 yards in his first game and had four passing touchdowns. In 2012, Powell went 197-of-349 passing for 2,322 yards with 18 touchdowns. After the season, he was named Central Intercollegiate Athletic Association (CIAA) Offensive Rookie of the Year while also making the CIAA All-Rookie Team.

=== 2013 season ===
In his sophomore season in 2013, Powell went 180-for-334 for 2,129 passing yards, 16 touchdowns, and nine interceptions.

=== 2014 season ===
In their first game in 2014, Powell passed for 256 yards, five touchdowns, and two interceptions. He also added 21 rushing attempts for 75 yards and a touchdown. He was then named Week 1 CIAA Quarterback Player of the Week. In their game against Paine College, Powell ran for 92 yards and had five total touchdowns. On September 17, Powell was named CIAA Quarterback of the Week again. Against Bowie State University, Powell had 329 passing yards, four passing touchdowns, and 94 rushing yards. For the third week in a row, Powell was named CIAA Quarterback of the Week. Powell finished the season 184-of-333 passing for 2,419 yards, 28 touchdowns, and 15 interceptions, as well as 784 rushing yards, and six rushing touchdowns. On November 14, Powell was named to the All-CIAA First Team.

=== 2015 season ===
In 2015, Powell went into his last season at Livingstone. On October 31, Powell threw for 364 yards and four total touchdowns. He was named conference Quarterback of the Week for his performance. Powell finished the season with 184 completions on 315 attempts, 2,166 yards, 15 touchdowns, and 11 interceptions, as well as 155 rushing attempts, 614 rushing yards, and eight rushing touchdowns. On November 11, Powell was named CIAA Offensive Player of the Year and All-CIAA First Team. Powell played in the 2015 Euro-American Challenge, earning himself the game's MVP in the process. He was also given an honorable mention as a Boxtorow HBCU All-American.

== Professional career ==
=== Sydney Express ===
In 2016, Powell signed his first professional contract with the Sydney Express of the National Gridiron League (NGL) in Australia.

=== Sioux Falls Storm ===
On January 8, 2017, Powell was signed by the Sioux Falls Storm of the Indoor Football League (IFL). Powell did not just play as a quarterback, but as well as running back, wide receiver, defensive back, and return specialist. Powell appeared in seven games for the Storm totaling two completions for 25 yards, six rushing attempts for six yards, a rushing touchdown, six receptions for 83 yards, and three receiving touchdowns. Powell was then released.

=== Nebraska Danger ===
On May 24, 2017, Powell signed with the Nebraska Danger.

In his first career professional start, Powell completed nine passes on 16 attempts for 142 yards and two touchdowns as well as 81 rushing yards and an additional touchdown on the ground. Powell's breakout game came in Week 16 when he went 16-for-25 for 145 yards, and a touchdown while having 102 rushing yards and four rushing touchdowns against the Cedar Rapids Titans. Powell was awarded his first-ever IFL Offensive Player of the Week Award for his efforts. Powell ended the season on a high note, being awarded Week 18 Offensive Player of the Week for tying a franchise record of five rushing touchdowns. With a win in the season finale, the Danger qualified for the Intense Conference Championship game with a 9–7 record. Powell ended the season with Nebraska having 54 completions on 81 attempts for 564 yards, six touchdowns, and two interceptions as well as 49 rushing attempts for 334 yards and 13 touchdowns.

In the Conference Championship, Powell finished 14-for-22 for 129 yards, two touchdowns, and two interceptions while rushing for an additional touchdown. Despite this performance, the Danger lost to the Arizona Rattlers, 36–62.

=== Iowa Barnstormers ===
On October 8, 2017, Powell signed with the Iowa Barnstormers of the Indoor Football League (IFL). Powell made his Barnstormers debut on February 25, 2018, against the Green Bay Blizzard. He had 20 completions on 26 attempts for 208 yards, four touchdowns, and 48 rushing yards. He would be awarded the IFL Offensive Player of the Week Award for his efforts.

=== Saskatchewan Roughriders ===
On April 24, 2018, the Saskatchewan Roughriders of the Canadian Football League (CFL) signed Powell to their mini-camp roster. On April 26, Powell was released.

=== Iowa Barnstormers (II) ===
Returning to the Barnstormers on May 5, Powell rushed for his first 100-yard rushing performance against the Sioux Falls Storm. On June 2, Powell rushed for 129 yards and two touchdowns, earning his second Offensive Player of the Week Award of the season. On June 8, Powell went 17-for-19, 166 yards, and five passing touchdowns, earning his second straight Offensive Player of the Week Award. He finished the 2018 season leading the league in completion percentage (68.1), rushing attempts (191), rushing yards (945), and rushing touchdowns (23). His 945 rushing yards were second-best and the most by any quarterback in league history. Powell won his first IFL Most Valuable Player Award and was a First-Team All-IFL selection.

In the first round of the playoffs, Powell threw for 111 yards and two touchdowns. He also rushed for 48 yards and three touchdowns. The Barnstormers would defeat the Nebraska Danger, 48–17. They played the Storm in the 2018 United Bowl. Powell passed for 178 yards and four touchdowns, rushing for 48 yards, and a touchdown. Powell led the Barnstormers to a 42–38 victory and their first United Bowl victory.

=== Saskatchewan Roughriders (II) ===
On October 2, 2018, Saskatchewan signed Powell to their practice squad following the end of the 2018 IFL season, but he was again released on October 25.

=== Atlantic City Blackjacks ===
Before the 2019 AFL season, Powell was announced as one of the eight players assigned to the Atlantic City Blackjacks. Despite being added to the active roster, Powell did not play a single game in the Arena Football League (AFL). On April 19, 2019, Powell was placed on a recallable reassignment but was never reassigned to the team's active roster.

=== Arizona Rattlers ===
==== 2019 season ====
On April 24, 2019, Powell signed with the Arizona Rattlers of the Indoor Football League (IFL). Despite being signed midway through the season, Powell was an instant starting caliber quarterback for the Rattlers.

In his Rattlers debut, Powell took over for Arizona's starting quarterback, Jeff Ziemba, in the second quarter against the Nebraska Danger. Powell finished the game 8-for-10 for 96 passing yards, two passing touchdowns, one interception, 63 rushing yards, and three rushing touchdowns. He earned the starting job in the Rattlers' next game against the San Diego Strike Force, where he threw for 152 yards and four touchdowns as well as running for 104 yards and five rushing touchdowns, winning the game 84–63. In his third game against the Tucson Sugar Skulls, Powell went 13-for-15 on 180 passing yards and five passing touchdowns as well as two rushing touchdowns. In his next game, Powell was subbed out of the game in the third quarter in a 56–0 blowout of the Cedar Rapids River Kings. Powell finished the 2019 season with 62 completions on 84 attempts for 807 passing yards, 18 touchdowns, and two interceptions. He also finished with 13 rushing touchdowns in only six games.

In the semi-finals, Powell went 12-for-16 passing with 110 yards and two interceptions. He also added 91 yards rushing and three touchdowns. They defeated his old team, the Nebraska Danger, 62–45. In the 2019 United Bowl, Powell had 166 yards passing, two passing touchdowns, 27 rushing yards, and a rushing touchdown. The Rattlers would fall short of their championship run after the game ended in a 56–53 loss.

==== 2021 season ====
Powell rejoined the Rattlers for the 2021 IFL season after sitting out during the 2020 lockout season.

In the first game of the season, Powell led the Rattlers to a victory over the newest IFL team, the Northern Arizona Wranglers, 51–20. He went 8-for-9 for 90 yards and a touchdown. In Week 7, Powell earned his first Offensive Player of the Week Award of the season when he passed for 173 yards, five touchdowns, and an interception. On July 31, Powell set a career-high for rushing touchdowns in a season with 24, passing the mark of 23 that he set in 2018. On July 31, Powell broke the Rattlers' single-season rushing touchdowns record when he recorded five rushing touchdowns against the Duke City Gladiators. On August 13, Powell broke the Rattlers' single-season rushing record of 773 yards with his 59-yard performance bringing his total to 815 yards.

Powell finished the season leading the league in completion percentage (69.4), rushing attempts (137), rushing yards (902), and rushing touchdowns (35). His 35 rushing touchdowns broke the league record. Powell was awarded Second Team All-IFL honors as well as his second IFL Most Valuable Player Award.

In the first round of the playoffs, Powell threw for 170 yards and five touchdowns while rushing for two more touchdowns. He helped the Rattlers defeat the Sioux Falls Storm, 69–42. In the semi-finals, Powell had a touchdown and an interception passing while rushing for 98 yards and three touchdowns. They defeated the Duke City Gladiators, 58–55. The Rattlers faced the Massachusetts Pirates in the 2021 United Bowl. In the game, Powell had 136 passing yards, two passing touchdowns, and two interceptions as well as running for 70 yards and three touchdowns. Powell would watch the last play from the sidelines as Pirates' kicker, Garrett Hartley, made a 31-yard field goal to win the game, 37–34.

==== 2022 season ====
Needs 2022 season

=== Edmonton Elks ===
On August 23, 2022, Powell signed as an American to the Edmonton Elks of the Canadian Football League (CFL). Powell was then released on September 1.

=== Arizona Rattlers (II) ===
After his second stint in the CFL, Powell signed on to play with the Arizona Rattlers for the 2023 IFL season.

Two games into the season, Powell suffered an upper-body injury. He would subsequently be placed on short-term IR just days later. Jorge Reyna, who was previously on the San Diego Strike Force, was slotted in as the team's starting quarterback. The Rattlers also signed IFL Hall of Famer Chris Dixon as the team's backup. On May 11, the Rattlers announced that Powell was cleared to play in their Week 9 contest against the Vegas Knight Hawks. In his first game since injury, Powell had an impressive game with 206 passing yards, four passing touchdowns (one interception), 38 rushing yards, and two rushing touchdowns in a 54–55 loss.

In his second game back against the Northern Arizona Wranglers, Powell had eight total touchdowns (four passing, four rushing) in their dominating 60–34 win. The Rattlers would improve to 5–4 on the season after defeating the Vegas Knight Hawks, 63–39. During the game, Powell scored his 81st career rushing touchdown in a Rattlers uniform, tying the franchise record for most rushing touchdowns. He would also be subbed out of the game late in the fourth quarter for Jorge Reyna. A week later, Powell broke the record with his 82nd rushing touchdown. During that game, Powell had a total of eight total touchdowns (five passing, three rushing) for the second time in the season. Powell earned Week 12 Offensive Player of the Week.

In Week 13, Powell had four passing touchdowns and a career-tying five rushing touchdowns to earn him back-to-back Offensive Player of the Week Awards. In Week 15, Powell earned his third Offensive Player of the Week Award in four weeks when he had six passing touchdowns and one rushing touchdown. In Week 16, Powell passed for a total of four passing touchdowns bringing his total on the season to 40, making it the second time that he recorded 40 or more passing touchdowns in a season. In Week 18, Powell and company got their 9th-straight win in a 55–39 performance over the Northern Arizona Wranglers, clinching them the top seed in the Western Conference in the process.

Powell led the league in completion percentage (69.5) and passer rating (199.1). He also had 2,048 passing yards on 164 completions and 236 attempts, as well as 43 touchdowns to four interceptions, and 25 rushing touchdowns. He was named All-IFL Second-Team and IFL Offensive Player of the Year. In the first round of the playoffs, the Rattlers lost to the Wranglers, 62–53.

=== Tucson Sugar Skulls ===
After re-signing with the Rattlers for the 2024 IFL season on August 14, 2023, Powell was traded to the Tucson Sugar Skulls in exchange for quarterback Ramone Atkins on November 6.

=== Orlando Predators ===
On November 29, 2023, the Orlando Predators announced via their social media pages that they had signed Powell for the 2024 AFL season.

=== Arizona Rattlers (III) ===
On November 3, 2024, Powell re-signed with the Arizona Rattlers for the 2025 season.

== Career statistics ==
=== IFL ===
Legend
	IFL MVP
	IFL Offensive Player of the Year
	Won the United Bowl / IFL National Championship
	Led the league
**Bold**	Career best

==== Regular season ====
Year	Team	Games			Passing										Rushing					Fumbles	
Year	Team	GP	GS	Record	Cmp	Att	Pct	Yds	Y/A	Y/G	Lng	TD	Int	Rtg	Att	Yds	Y/A	Lng	TD	Fum	Lost
2017	SFS	7	0	—	2	9	22.2	25	2.8	3.8	17	0	0	39.6	6	6	1.0	4	1	**0**	**0**
2017	NEB	4	3	1–2	54	81	66.7	564	7.0	141.0	45	6	2	--	49	334	6.8	36	13	**0**	**0**
2018	IOW	12	12	7–5	154	226	68.1	1,604	7.1	173.9	**45**	34	4	173.9	**191**	**945**	4.9	27	23	3	3
2019	ARI	6	5	5–0	62	84	**73.8**	807	**9.6**	134.5	**45**	18	**2**	**220.5**	46	328	**7.1**	**42**	13	1	1
2021	ARI	14	14	12–2	168	242	69.4	1,745	7.2	124.6	38	30	7	165.1	137	902	6.6	36	**35**	?	?
2022	ARI	**16**	**16**	**13–3**	**192**	**288**	66.7	**2,271**	7.9	141.9	**45**	**45**	7	179.6	119	697	5.7	28	23	?	?
2023	ARI	11	11	9–2	164	236	69.5	2,048	8.7	**186.2**	**45**	43	4	199.1	86	503	5.8	27	25	2	2
2025	ARI	0	0	—	0	0	–	0	–	–	0	0	0	–	0	0	–	0	0	0	0
Career		70	62	48–14	796	1,166	68.3	9,064	7.8	129.5	45	176	26	178.4	634	3,715	5.9	42	133	?	?

==== Postseason ====
Year	Team	Games			Passing										Rushing					Fumbles	
Year	Team	GP	GS	Record	Cmp	Att	Pct	Yds	Y/A	Y/G	Lng	TD	Int	Rtg	Att	Yds	Y/A	Lng	TD	Fum	Lost
2017	NEB	1	1	0–1	14	22	63.6	129	5.9	129.0	24	2	2	--	7	8	1.1	5	1	0	0
2018	IOW	2	2	**2–0**	22	29	**75.9**	289	**10.0**	**144.5**	**42**	6	0	--	28	96	3.4	19	4	**1**	**1**
2019	ARI	2	2	1–1	28	37	75.7	276	7.5	138.0	29	4	0	--	22	118	5.4	**30**	5	**1**	**1**
2021	ARI	**3**	**3**	2–1	**32**	**47**	68.1	**395**	8.4	131.7	38	**8**	3	--	**36**	**203**	**5.6**	17	**8**	**1**	**1**
2022	ARI	2	2	1–1	25	38	65.8	359	9.5	119.7	41	**8**	2	--	13	37	2.9	20	4	**1**	0
2023	ARI	1	1	0–1	8	21	38.1	80	3.8	80.0	19	2	**5**	53.9	15	72	4.8	11	2	**1**	**1**
Career		11	11	6–5	129	194	66.5	1,528	7.9	138.9	42	30	12	--	121	534	4.4	30	24	5	4

==== IFL National Championship ====
NC	Team	Opp.	Passing								Rushing				Result
NC	Team	Opp.	Cmp	Att	Pct	Yds	Y/A	TD	Int	Rtg	Att	Yds	Y/A	TD	Result
2018	IOW	SFS	12	16	75.0	178	11.1	4	0	--	13	48	3.7	1	**W** 42–38
2019	ARI	SFS	**16**	**21**	**76.2**	166	7.9	2	0	--	11	27	2.5	2	L 53–56
2021	ARI	MAS	9	16	56.3	136	8.5	2	2	--	17	70	4.1	3	L 34–37^{(OT)}
Career			37	53	69.8	480	9.1	8	2	--	41	145	3.5	6	W−L 1–2

=== College ===
Year	Team	Games			Passing								Rushing			
Year	Team	GP	GS	Record	Cmp	Att	Pct	Yds	Avg	TD	Int	Rtg	Att	Yds	Avg	TD
2012	Livingstone	9	9	2–7	**197**	**349**	56.5	2,322	6.7	18	**5**	126.5	119	277	2.3	5
2013	Livingstone	**10**	**10**	3–7	188	324	58.0	2,129	6.6	16	9	124.0	141	252	1.8	4
2014	Livingstone	**10**	**10**	5–5	184	333	55.3	**2,419**	**7.3**	**28**	15	**135.0**	**193**	**784**	**4.1**	6
2015	Livingstone	9	9	**5–4**	184	315	**58.4**	2,166	6.9	15	11	124.9	155	614	4.0	**8**
Career		38	38	15–23	753	1,321	57.0	9,036	6.8	77	40	127.6	593	1,927	3.3	23

== Personal life ==
On December 3, 2022, Powell joined Brown Tribal Recreation and Wellness in a collab with Performance Strength & Conditioning for a flag football clinic in Sacaton, Arizona for kids.
