= Davontae Merriweather =

American football player (born 1993)

No. 8 – Arizona Rattlers
- Position: Defensive back
- Roster status: Active

Personal information
- Born: October 20, 1993 (age 33); Palmdale, California, U.S.
- Listed height: 6 ft 1 in (1.85 m)
- Listed weight: 210 lb (95 kg)

Career information
- High school: Highland (Palmdale)
- College: Saddleback (2012–2013); West Texas A&M (2015–2016)
- NFL draft: 2017: undrafted

Career history
- Arizona Rattlers (2018–2020); Toronto Argonauts (2021)*; Arizona Rattlers (2021–present)
- * Offseason or practice squad member only

Awards and highlights
- 2× IFL National Champion (2024, 2026); IFL National Championship MVP (2024); IFL Defensive Player of the Year (2019); 4× First-team All-IFL (2019, 2022, 2023, 2025); Second-team All-IFL (2026); First-team All-LSC (2016); Second-team All-LSC (2015)

Davontae Merriweather (born October 20, 1993) is an American professional indoor football defensive back for the Arizona Rattlers of the Indoor Football League (IFL). He played college football at Saddleback College before transferring to West Texas A&M.

== College career ==
On January 8, 2014, Merriweather committed to San Diego State, but never enrolled, sitting out during the 2014 season.

== Professional career ==
=== Arizona Rattlers (first stint) ===
Merriweather signed with the Arizona Rattlers of the Indoor Football League (IFL) for the 2018 season. He made his debut on February 25, 2018, against the Sioux Falls Storm, where he collected four tackles in the 33–39 loss. On June 16, against the Nebraska Danger, Merriweather intercepted his first two career passes in the 59–23 win. The Rattlers season came to an end when Sioux Falls beat them 68–69 in overtime of the IFL Semifinals.

=== Toronto Argonauts ===
On December 21, 2020, the Toronto Argonauts of the Canadian Football League (CFL) signed Merriweather. On July 27, 2021, Merriweather was released.

=== Arizona Rattlers (second stint) ===
On August 3, 2021, the Rattlers re-signed Merriweather for the remainder of the 2021 season.

On November 4, 2021, the Rattlers re-signed Merriweather for the 2022 season.

On October 11, 2022, Merriweather re-signed with the Rattlers for the 2023 season.

On February 1, 2025, Merriweather re-signed with the Rattlers for the 2025 season.

== Career statistics ==
=== IFL ===
Legend
	IFL Defensive Player of the Year
	IFL National Championship MVP
	Won the IFL National Championship
	Led the league
**Bold**	Career high

==== Regular season ====
Year	Team	Games		Tackles					Interceptions						Fumbles		
Year	Team	GP	GS	Cmb	Solo	Ast	Sck	TFL	PD	Int	Yds	Avg	Lng	TD	FF	FR	TD
2018	ARI	9	5	52	39	13	0.0	1.0	0	2	19	9.5	19	0	0	0	0
2019	ARI	14	14	103	71	32	1.0	3.0	12	4	33	8.3	26	1	0	2	0
2020	ARI	0	0	DNP													
2021	ARI	3	3	23	17	6	0.0	1.0	1	0	0	0.0	0	0	0	0	0
2022	ARI																
2023	ARI																
2024	ARI																
2025	ARI																

==== Postseason ====
Year	Team	Games		Tackles					Interceptions						Fumbles		
Year	Team	GP	GS	Cmb	Solo	Ast	Sck	TFL	PD	Int	Yds	Avg	Lng	TD	FF	FR	TD
2018	ARI	1	1	8	7	1	0.0	0.0	**2**	0	0	0.0	0	0	0	0	0
2019	ARI	2	2	11	7	4	0.0	0.5	0	1	0	0.0	0	0	0	0	0
2021	ARI	**3**	**3**	**17**	10	**7**	0.0	**1.0**	0	0	0	0.0	0	0	0	0	0
2022	ARI	2	2	7	5	2	0.0	0.0	0	0	0	0.0	0	0	0	0	0
2023	ARI	1	1	9	6	3	0.0	0.0	1	0	0	0.0	0	0	0	0	0
2024	ARI	**3**	**3**	15	**12**	3	0.0	0.5	**2**	**5**	**77**	**15.4**	**50**	**1**	0	0	0
Career		12	12	67	47	20	0.0	2.0	5	6	77	12.8	50	1	0	0	0

=== College ===
Year	Team	Games		Tackles					Interceptions					Fumbles		
Year	Team	GP	GS	Solo	Ast	Cmb	TfL	Sck	Int	Yds	Avg	TD	PD	FR	FF	TD
2012	Saddleback	8	0	6	4	10	2.0	**2.0**	0	0	0.0	0	0	0	0	0
2013	Saddleback	**10**	**10**	32	21	53	1.0	1.5	**5**	**104**	**20.8**	**1**	5	0	**2**	0
2015	West Texas A&M	9	2	30	**31**	**61**	3.0	0.0	3	45	15.0	**1**	7	0	0	0
2016	West Texas A&M	**10**	**10**	**36**	21	57	**6.5**	0.5	2	33	16.5	**1**	**8**	0	1	0
Career		37	29	104	77	181	12.5	4.0	10	182	18.2	3	20	0	3	0
