= IFL National Championship =

Indoor Football League championship game

- United Bowl (2009–2021)
- Stadium: Tucson Arena (Note: Tucson Arena at the Tucson Convention Center in Tucson, Arizona will hold the IFL National Championship from 2025 to 2027.)
- Location: Tucson, Arizona
- First played: August 15, 2009; 17 years ago

2023 season
- 2023 IFL National Championship; The Dollar Loan Center; Henderson, Nevada (August 5, 2023); Bay Area Panthers 51; Sioux Falls Storm 41

2024 season
- 2024 IFL National Championship; Lee's Family Forum; Henderson, Nevada (August 17, 2024); Arizona Rattlers 53; Massachusetts Pirates 16

2025 season
- 2025 IFL National Championship; Tucson Arena; Tucson, Arizona (August 23, 2025); Vegas Knight Hawks 64; Green Bay Blizzard 61

The IFL National Championship (formerly the United Bowl) is the annual league championship game of the Indoor Football League (IFL). It has served as the final game of every IFL season since 2009, except for 2020 due to the COVID-19 pandemic.

== Origin ==
The IFL continued to use the "United Bowl" name originally used by United Indoor Football (UIF). The UIF used this name before they merged with Intense Football League to form the Indoor Football League. The UIF held United Bowl I, II, III, and IV in 2005 through 2008, with all four being won by the Sioux Falls Storm. Although the name "National Indoor Bowl Championship" was used for the 2008 contest between the UIF and the Intense Football League, the "United Bowl" name continued to be used for the combined league's championship until 2021 when it was rebranded.

== Game history ==
=== 2009–2010: Outlaws dominance ===
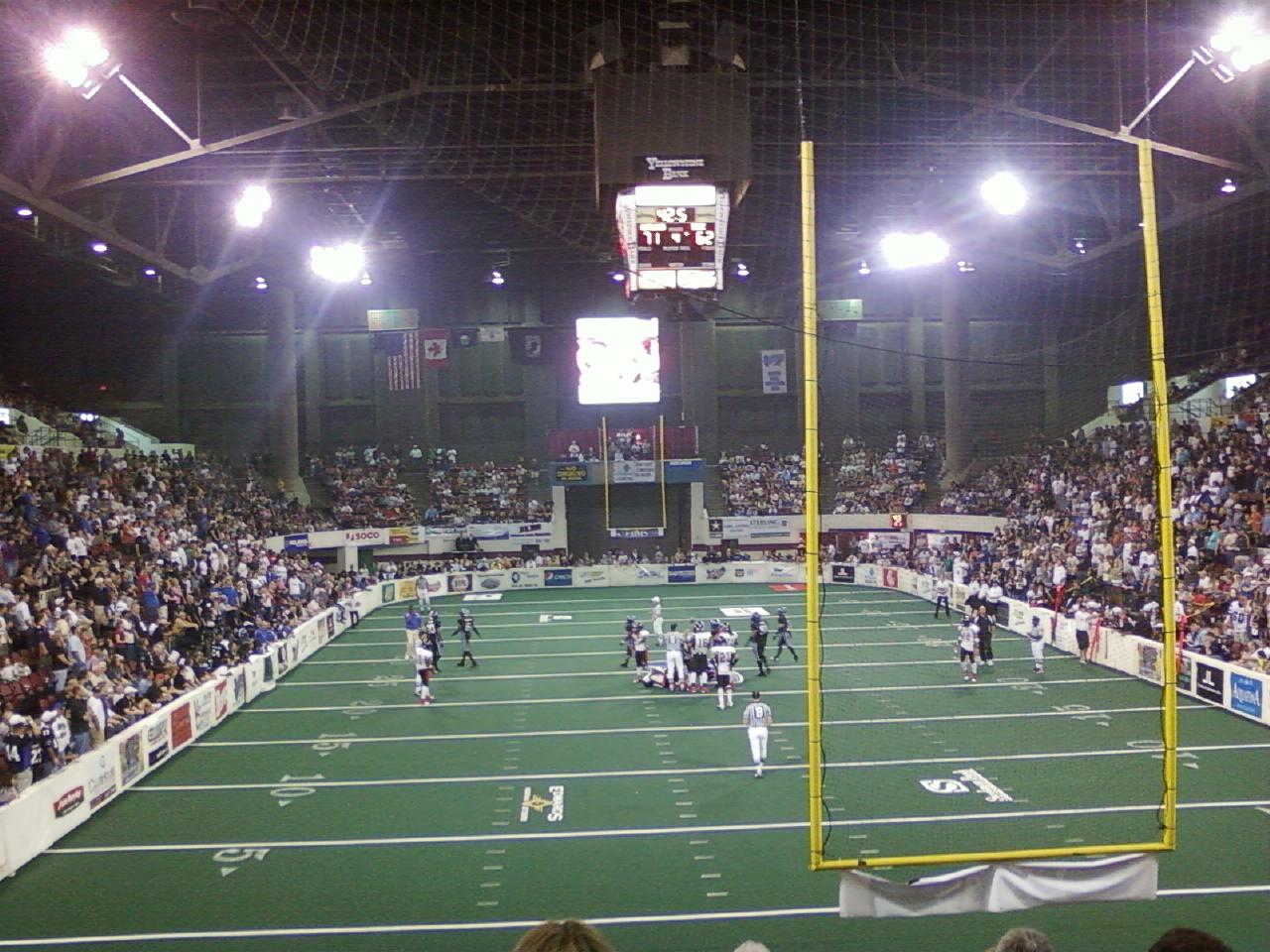
Seconds before the Outlaws 2009 United Bowl victory

The Billings Outlaws won the first two United Bowls, defeating the River City Rage and Sioux Falls Storm following the 2009 and 2010 seasons, respectively. The Outlaws were led by quarterback Chris Dixon, who was named the Most Valuable Player of both games. After the 2010 Billings tornado damaged Rimrock Auto Arena, the Outlaws ceased operations.

=== 2011–2016: Storm reign ===
Dixon joined the Storm before the start of the 2011 season, immediately having an impact by winning the league's Most Valuable Player Award and leading Sioux Falls to a 37–10 victory over the Tri-Cities Fever in the 2011 United Bowl. In the following season, Dixon repeated as league MVP and led the Storm to their second straight United Bowl victory over the Fever.

Dixon would be replaced by former Storm quarterback Terrance Bryant, who led the team to four United Indoor Football (UIF) titles from 2005 to 2008, during the 2013 season. Bryant would win United Bowl MVP after defeating the Nebraska Danger in their first United Bowl appearance.

Dixon re-joined the Storm during the 2014 season after one season in the Arena Football League (AFL). He led the Storm to a 13–0 start to the season before losing to the Cedar Rapids Titans in the final week of the regular season. After winning the United Conference Championship, the Storm would defeat the Danger for the second straight season to win their fourth straight title. Dixon announced his retirement after the 2014 United Bowl.

Lorenzo Brown took over as the Storm's quarterback in 2015, leading the team to a perfect 14–0 regular season record and a rematch against the Nebraska Danger in the 2015 United Bowl. The Storm would dominate the Danger, winning 62–27. Brown returned as the Storm's quarterback in 2016, helping Sioux Falls win their sixth consecutive championship, this time over the Spokane Empire.

=== 2017–2021: First-year titles ===
The Storm advanced to the 2017 United Bowl to face the Arizona Rattlers in their first year competing in the IFL. The Rattlers upset the Storm in a 50–41 victory, ending the Storm's chances of a seven-peat. The Iowa Barnstormers, led by league MVP Drew Powell, would defeat the Storm in the 2018 United Bowl after an 11–3 season.

Sioux Falls reached the United Bowl for the tenth straight time in 2019, defeating the Rattlers and earning their seventh United Bowl championship.

The 2020 season was canceled due to the COVID-19 pandemic. In 2021, the Massachusetts Pirates joined the IFL and immediately had an impact, going 11–3 and defeating the Arizona Rattlers in the 2021 United Bowl. The 2021 United Bowl marked the first time since 2009 that the Sioux Falls Storm did not make the championship game.

=== 2022–2024: Western Conference's winning streak ===
On May 9, 2022, the IFL struck a deal to rebrand the United Bowl to the IFL National Championship. The move came in conjuncture with the league announcing that The Dollar Loan Center (later renamed Lee's Family Forum) in Henderson, Nevada would be the host of the championship games for the next three seasons.

During the 2022 IFL National Championship, the Northern Arizona Wranglers, led by quarterback Kaleb Barker, defeated the Quad City Steamwheelers, earning their first title. In the following season, the Bay Area Panthers earned their first title by defeating the Sioux Falls Storm in the 2023 IFL National Championship.

In a 2021 United Bowl rematch, the Arizona Rattlers got revenge over the Massachusetts Pirates to win their second IFL championship in 2024.

On November 7, 2024, the IFL entered a three-year agreement to hold the IFL National Championship in Tucson Arena at the Tucson Convention Center in Tucson, Arizona after the three-year partnership with Lee's Family Forum expired.

== Games ==
Championships table key and summary
2009–2017	2022–present
United Conference	Eastern Conference
United champion^{U} (9, 6–3)	Eastern champion^{E} (5, 0–5)
Intense Conference	Western Conference
Intense champion^{I} (9, 3–6)	Western champion^{W} (5, 5–0)

Game	Date	Winning team	Score	Losing team	Venue	City	Attendance	Ref.
2009	August 15, 2009	Billings Outlaws^{I} (1, 1–0)	71–62	RiverCity Rage^{U} (1, 0–1)	Rimrock Auto Arena	Billings, MT	8,351	
2010	July 17, 2010	Billings Outlaws^{I} (2, 2–0)	43–34	Sioux Falls Storm^{U} (1, 0–1)	Billings Sports Plex	Billings, MT (2)	2,500	
2011	July 16, 2011	Sioux Falls Storm^{U} (2, 1–1)	37–10	Tri-Cities Fever^{I} (1, 0–1)	Sioux Falls Arena	Sioux Falls, SD	4,696	
2012	July 14, 2012	Sioux Falls Storm^{U} (3, 2–1)	59–32	Tri-Cities Fever^{I} (2, 0–2)	Sioux Falls Arena (2)	Sioux Falls, SD (2)	4,901	
2013	June 29, 2013	Sioux Falls Storm^{U} (4, 3–1)	43–40	Nebraska Danger^{I} (1, 0–1)	Sioux Falls Arena (3)	Sioux Falls, SD (3)	5,202	
2014	June 28, 2014	Sioux Falls Storm^{U} (5, 4–1)	63–46	Nebraska Danger^{I} (2, 0–2)	Sioux Falls Arena (4)	Sioux Falls, SD (4)	4,500	
2015	July 11, 2015	Sioux Falls Storm^{U} (6, 5–1)	62–27	Nebraska Danger^{I} (3, 0–3)	Denny Sanford Premier Center	Sioux Falls, SD (5)	9,245	
2016	July 23, 2016	Sioux Falls Storm^{U} (7, 6–1)	55–34	Spokane Empire^{I} (1, 0–1)	Denny Sanford Premier Center (2)	Sioux Falls, SD (6)	9,000	
2017	July 8, 2017	Arizona Rattlers^{I} (1, 1–0)	50–41	Sioux Falls Storm^{U} (8, 6–2)	Denny Sanford Premier Center (3)	Sioux Falls, SD (7)		
2018	July 7, 2018	Iowa Barnstormers (1, 1–0)	42–38	Sioux Falls Storm (9, 6–3)	Wells Fargo Arena	Des Moines, IA	7,149	
2019	July 13, 2019	Sioux Falls Storm (10, 7–3)	56–53	Arizona Rattlers (2, 1–1)	Gila River Arena	Glendale, AZ	14,635	
2020	Season cancelled due to the COVID-19 pandemic							
2021	September 12, 2021	Massachusetts Pirates (1, 1–0)	37–34	Arizona Rattlers (3, 1–2)	Footprint Center	Phoenix, AZ	6,385	
2022	August 13, 2022	NAZ Wranglers^{W} (1, 1–0)	47–45	Quad City Steamwheelers^{E} (1, 0–1)	Dollar Loan Center	Henderson, NV	4,149	
2023	August 5, 2023	Bay Area Panthers^{W} (1, 1–0)	51–41	Sioux Falls Storm^{E} (11, 7–4)	Dollar Loan Center (2)	Henderson, NV (2)	3,674	
2024	August 17, 2024	Arizona Rattlers^{W} (4, 2–2)	53–16	Massachusetts Pirates^{E} (2, 1–1)	Lee's Family Forum (3)	Henderson, NV (3)	1,977	
2025	August 23, 2025	Vegas Knight Hawks^{W} (1, 1–0)	64–61	Green Bay Blizzard^{E} (1, 0–1)	Tucson Convention Center (1)	Tucson, AZ (1)	3,251	
2026	August 16, 2026	Arizona Rattlers^{W} (5, 3–2)	62–51	Green Bay Blizzard^{E} (2, 0–2)	Tucson Convention Center (2)	Tucson, AZ (2)	4,900	

== MVP ==
The IFL National Championship Most Valuable Player award, or simply the IFL National Championship MVP, is presented annually to the most valuable player of the IFL National Championship, the IFL championship game.

Key for the below tables
Symbol	Description
*	Player elected to the IFL Hall of Fame

IFL National Championship Most Valuable Players
Game	Winner	Team	Position	College	Ref.
2009	Chris Dixon*	Billings Outlaws	Quarterback	Humboldt State	
2010	Chris Dixon* (2)	Billings Outlaws (2)	Quarterback (2)	Humboldt State	
2011	Chris Dixon* (3)	Sioux Falls Storm	Quarterback (3)	Humboldt State	
2012	Jeremiah Price^{†}	Sioux Falls Storm (2)	Defensive end	Oklahoma State	
2013	Terrance Bryant*	Sioux Falls Storm (3)	Quarterback (4)	Oregon State	
2014 (Note: Chris Dixon and James Terry were named co-MVPs of the 2014 United Bowl, the only United Bowl with co-MVPs.)	Chris Dixon* (4)	Sioux Falls Storm (4)	Quarterback (5)	Humboldt State	
2014	James Terry*	Sioux Falls Storm (5)	Wide receiver	Kansas State	
2015	Brandon Johnson-Farrell	Sioux Falls Storm (6)	Wide receiver (2)	Sioux Falls	
2016	Lorenzo Brown Jr.^{†}	Sioux Falls Storm (7)	Quarterback (6)	Sioux Falls	
2017	Justin Shirk	Arizona Rattlers	Linebacker	Bloomsburg	
2018	Ryan Balentine	Iowa Barnstormers	Wide receiver (3)	Southern Miss	
2019	Lorenzo Brown Jr.^{†} (2)	Sioux Falls Storm (8)	Quarterback (7)	Sioux Falls	
2021	Alejandro Bennifield^{†}	Massachusetts Pirates	Quarterback (8)	Chattanooga	
2022	JaQuan Artis^{†}	Northern Arizona Wranglers	Defensive end (2)	Lenoir-Rhyne	
2023	Dalton Sneed^{†}	Bay Area Panthers	Quarterback (9)	Montana	
2024	Davontae Merriweather^{†}	Arizona Rattlers (2)	Defensive back	West Texas A&M	
2025	Jayden de Laura	Vegas Knight Hawks	Quarterback (10)	Arizona	
2026	Max Meylor	Arizona Rattlers (3)	Quarterback (11)	Wisconsin-Whitewater	
