= 2018 United Bowl =

Sioux Falls Storm	Iowa Barnstormers
(11–3)	(11–3)
38	42
Head coach: Kurtiss Riggs	Head coach: Dixie Wooten
	1	2	3	4	Total
Sioux Falls	0	17	14	7	38
Iowa	7	14	7	14	42
- Date: July 7, 2018
- Stadium: Wells Fargo Arena
- Location: Des Moines, Iowa, U.S.
- MVP: Iowa WR Ryan Balentine
- Attendance: 7,149

United States TV coverage
- Network: YouTube and MC-22
- Announcers: Rich Roste (Storm)

The 2018 United Bowl was the championship game of the 2018 Indoor Football League season. It was played between the Sioux Falls Storm and the Iowa Barnstormers. The game was played at Wells Fargo Arena in Des Moines, Iowa.

This was the Sioux Falls Storm's ninth consecutive United Bowl appearance; prior to the game, they held a United Bowl record of 6–2. This was the Iowa Barnstormers' first United Bowl appearance after joining the IFL in 2015 from the Arena Football League.

== Venue ==
The game was played at Wells Fargo Arena in Des Moines, Iowa, as the Iowa Barnstormers had the home field advantage by cause of being the higher seeded team in the playoffs.

== Background ==
2018 Indoor Football League
	W	L	PCT	PF	PA	GB	STK
y-Iowa Barnstormers	11	3	.786	648	493	—	W1
x-Arizona Rattlers	11	3	.786	746	567	—	W1
x-Sioux Falls Storm	11	3	.786	724	577	—	W5
x-Nebraska Danger	4	10	.286	525	592	7	L9
Cedar Rapids Titans	3	11	.214	543	733	8	L1
Green Bay Blizzard	2	12	.143	421	645	9	L4

y - clinched regular season title

x - clinched playoff spot

=== Sioux Falls Storm ===
The Storm began the season with a 39–33 loss to the Arizona Rattlers before embarking on a four-game win streak, including a 52–40 victory over the Barnstormers on March 18. After another loss to the Rattlers on April 16, the Storm won seven of their final eight games, finishing the season with a record of 11–3, earning third place. On June 23, the Storm defeated the Rattlers in the first round of the playoffs in overtime by a score of 69–68, earning their place in the United Bowl for the ninth consecutive year.

=== Iowa Barnstormers ===
The Barnstormers opened the 2018 season on February 25 with a 41–20 victory over the Green Bay Blizzard. After losing two of their next four games, including a 52–40 loss to the Storm on March 18, the Barnstormers won eight of their final nine, with their only loss being against the Storm by a score of 51–49. The Barnstormers finished the season with a record of 11–3, earning first place and home field advantage in the playoffs. In the first round, the Barnstormers defeated the Nebraska Danger 42–17 to reach the 2018 United Bowl.

== Box score ==
Quarter	1	2	3	4	Total
Storm	0	17	14	7	38
Barnstormers	7	14	7	14	42

at Wells Fargo Arena, Des Moines, Iowa

- Date: July 7, 2018
- Game time: 7:05 p.m. CDT

Scoring summary

Quarter	Time	Drive			Team	Scoring information	Score	
Quarter	Time	Plays	Yards	TOP	Team	Scoring information	SFX	IWA
1	07:36	10	45	7:24	IWA	Butler 6-yard touchdown reception from Powell, Gable kick good	0	7
2	13:18	6	37	2:36	SFX	Brown 11-yard touchdown run, Bergner kick good	7	7
2	12:17	1	42	0:22	IWA	Ballentine 42-yard touchdown reception from Powell, Gable kick good	7	14
2	06:30	8	42	4:49	SFX	Powell 2-yard touchdown reception from Brown, Bergner kick good	14	14
2	05:08	2	28	0:59	IWA	Ballentine 23-yard touchdown reception from Powell, Gable kick good	14	21
2	00:04	8	20	4:08	SFX	28-yard field goal by Bergner	17	21
3	09:32	8	40	5:17	SFX	Brown 1-yard touchdown run, Bergner kick good	24	21
3	04:49	6	45	3:54	IWA	Powell 3-yard touchdown run, Syrovatka kick good	24	28
3	00:30	5	29	3:19	SFX	Brown 11-yard touchdown run, Bergner kick good	31	28
4	09:10	8	29	5:58	IWA	Ballentine 4-yard touchdown reception from Powell, Gable kick good	31	35
4	03:27	8	40	4:54	SFX	Brown 3-yard touchdown run, Bergner kick good	38	35
4	00:13	5	37	2:30	IWA	Tyler 8-yard touchdown run, Gable kick good	38	42
"TOP" = time of possession. For other American football terms, see Glossary of American football.							SFX	IWA
