= National Gridiron League =

National Gridiron League may refer to:

- National Gridiron League (Australia), a proposed American football league
- National Gridiron League (United States), a proposed indoor American football league
