= 2024 Tucson Sugar Skulls season =

5th season in franchise history

- Owner: Cathy Guy
- Head coach: Billy Back (1st season)
- Home stadium: Tucson Convention Center

Results
- Record: 2–14 (2–11)
- Conference place: N/A Western

The 2024 season is the Tucson Sugar Skulls' 5th season in the Indoor Football League (IFL) and their first under the head coach Billy Back. The Sugar Skulls will attempt to improve from their 9–6 record from the previous year and make the playoffs for the third year in a row.

== Offseason ==
=== Coaching changes ===
==== Hirings ====
- September 1, 2023 – Billy Back was hired as head coach.
- October 5, 2023 – Joshua Resignalo was hired as defensive coordinator.

==== Resignations ====
- September 1, 2023 – Hurtis Chinn resigned as head coach.

=== Roster changes ===
All transactional dates pulled from Transactions.

==== Signings ====
- September 11, 2023 – re-signed QB Ramone Atkins.
- September 14, 2023 – re-signed WR M. J. Harris.
- September 14, 2023 – signed DB Sean Harper.
- September 14, 2023 – signed WR Akilian Butler.
- September 14, 2023 – signed DL Lamonte McDougle.
- September 14, 2023 – signed WR Tyrin Ralph.
- September 14, 2023 – signed RB Ahmari Davis.
- September 15, 2023 – signed RB Trelon Smith.
- September 15, 2023 – signed DB James Jackson.
- September 15, 2023 – signed DL Sterling Johnson.
- September 15, 2023 – signed DB David Haney.
- September 15, 2023 – signed OL Cliff Porter.
- September 15, 2023 – signed DB Jalen Phelps.
- September 25, 2023 – signed DL Arthur Randall.
- September 25, 2023 – re-signed DL Trae'varis Ferrell.
- September 25, 2023 – re-signed WR Carrington Thompson.
- October 2, 2023 – signed QB Neiko Hollins.
- October 2, 2023 – re-signed DL Dominion Ezinwa.
- October 2, 2023 – signed WR Allen Dailey.
- October 9, 2023 – re-signed RB Mike Jones.
- October 9, 2023 – signed WR Darrion Landry.
- October 9, 2023 – signed DL Terrance Jones.
- October 16, 2023 – signed OL Austin Schofield.
- October 16, 2023 – signed DB Kaytron Allen.
- October 16, 2023 – signed OL Chibueze Nwanna.
- October 16, 2023 – signed DB Robert Sheffield.
- October 23, 2023 – signed OL Jacob Ungruhe.
- October 23, 2023 – re-signed DB Carlito Gonzalez.
- October 23, 2023 – signed DB John Broussard.
- October 30, 2023 – signed DL Shaheem Haltiwanger.
- November 1, 2023 – signed DB/LB Caleb Tannor.
- November 6, 2023 – signed DB Jonathan Haynes.
- November 15, 2023 – signed DB Lakevias Daniel.
- November 20, 2023 – signed WR Mike Carrigan.
- November 23, 2023 – signed WR Jerminic Smith.
- November 30, 2023 – signed OL Brandon Nicholson.

==== Releases ====
- September 25, 2023 – released QB Dylan Vanboxel.
- October 2, 2023 – released WR Tim Lukas.
- October 2, 2023 – released WR Dylan Person.
- October 9, 2023 – released K Michael Hall.
- October 9, 2023 – released RB Ben Jones.
- October 16, 2023 – released WR Darian Patterson.
- October 16, 2023 – released DB Jakoby Pappillion.
- October 16, 2023 – released DB Mike Minter.
- October 16, 2023 – released DB Simeon Burns.
- October 23, 2023 – released DL Dylan Cozens.
- October 23, 2023 – released OL Jacob Ayyub.
- November 15, 2023 – released DL Zach Blackiston.
- November 23, 2023 – released DL Isame Faciane.

==== Trades ====
- October 30, 2023 – traded DL Maurice Jackson to Vegas for DL Boss Tagaloa and OL Isaac Jackson.
- November 1, 2023 – traded DB Rashie Hodge and DL Melik Owens to Quad City for WR Mike Carrigan.
- November 6, 2023 – traded QB Ramone Atkins to Arizona for QB Drew Powell.

==== Exempts ====
- November 6, 2023 – XFL-exempted OL Fernando Frye.

==== Retirements ====
- October 30, 2023 – WR Carrington Thompson retired.

== Personnel ==
=== Roster ===
Tucson Sugar Skulls roster
Quarterbacks: -- Neiko Hollins; Running backs: -- Ahmari Davis; 8 Mike Jones; -- Trelon Smith; Wide receivers: -- Akilian Butler; -- Allen Dailey; -- Mike Carrigan; 3 M. J. Harris; -- Darrion Landry; -- Tyrin Ralph; -- Jerminic Smith	Offensive linemen: -- Isaac Jackson; -- Chibueze Nwanna; -- Cliff Porter; -- Austin Schofield; -- Jacob Ungruhe; Defensive linemen: 88 Dominion Ezinwa; 7 Trae'varis Ferrell; -- Shaheem Haltiwanger; -- Sterling Johnson; -- Terrance Jones; -- Lamonte McDougle; -- Arthur Randall; -- Boss Tagaloa	Linebackers: -- Caleb Tannor; Defensive backs: -- Kaytron Allen; -- John Broussard; -- Lakevias Daniel; 12 Carlito Gonzalez; -- David Haney; -- Sean Harper; -- Jonathan Haynes; -- James Jackson; -- Jalen Phelps; -- Robert Sheffield; Kickers	Reserve lists: 66 Fernando Frye OL (XFL-exempted); -- Drew Powell QB (Suspended); Rookies in italics Roster updated March 20, 2023; 34 Active, 0 Inactive, 1 Exempt → More rosters

=== Coaching staff ===
Tucson Sugar Skulls staff
Front office: Owner/CEO/chief operating officer – Cathy Guy; Co-owner – Ali Farhang; Media relations manager – Brandon Duenas; Digital media manager – David Koonce; Director of ticket operations – Nic Griffin; Head coaches: Head coach – Billy Back	Offensive coaches Defensive coaches: Defensive coordinator – Joshua Resignalo; → Coaching Staff → Front Office → Ownership

== Regular season ==
=== Schedule ===
Week	Date	Time	Opponent	Rank	Site	TV	Result	Attendance
1	Bye week							
2	Bye week							
3	March 30	6:05 p.m.	at Northern Arizona Wranglers	—	Findlay Toyota Center · Prescott Valley, AZ	YouTube		
4	April 6	5:05 p.m.	at Duke City Gladiators	—	Rio Rancho Events Center · Rio Rancho, NM	YouTube		
5	April 14	3:05 p.m.	Bay Area Panthers	—	Tucson Convention Center · Tucson, AZ	YouTube		
6	April 18	4:30 p.m.	at San Antonio Gunslingers	—	Freeman Coliseum · San Antonio, TX	YouTube		
7	April 27	6:05 p.m.	Northern Arizona Wranglers	—	Tucson Convention Center · Tucson, AZ	YouTube		
8	Bye week							
9	May 11	6:05 p.m.	Arizona Rattlers	—	Tucson Convention Center · Tucson, AZ	YouTube		
10	May 17	7:05 p.m.	Vegas Knight Hawks	—	Tucson Convention Center · Tucson, AZ	YouTube		
11	May 25	6:05 p.m.	at Northern Arizona Wranglers	—	Findlay Toyota Center · Prescott Valley, AZ	YouTube		
12	June 1	6:05 p.m.	Duke City Gladiators	—	Tucson Convention Center · Tucson, AZ	YouTube		
13	June 8	6:05 p.m.	at Bay Area Panthers	—	SAP Center · San Jose, CA	YouTube		
14	June 15	6:05 p.m.	Frisco Fighters	—	Tucson Convention Center · Tucson, AZ	YouTube		
15	June 22	6:05 p.m.	San Diego Strike Force	—	Tucson Convention Center · Tucson, AZ	YouTube		
16	June 29	5:05 p.m.	at Duke City Gladiators	—	Rio Rancho Events Center · Rio Rancho, NM	YouTube		
17	July 7	3:05 p.m.	at Arizona Rattlers	—	Desert Diamond Arena · Glendale, AZ	YouTube		
18	July 13	6:05 p.m.	San Antonio Gunslingers	—	Tucson Convention Center · Tucson, AZ	YouTube		
19	July 20	6:05 p.m.	at Vegas Knight Hawks	—	Dollar Loan Center · Henderson, NV	YouTube		

=== Standings ===
Indoor Football League
	W	L	T	PCT	GB	CONF	PF	PA	STK
^{(1)} Bay Area Panthers	13	3		.813		12–3	665	563	W2
^{(2)} Vegas Knight Hawks	11	5		.688		9–4	830	680	W2
^{(3)} Arizona Rattlers	11	5		.688		7–5	784	710	W3
^{(4)} San Diego Strike Force	10	6		.625		9–5	710	649	L1
Northern Arizona Wranglers	9	7		.563		8–7	770	792	L2
San Antonio Gunslingers	8	8		.500		4–6	830	847	L1
Duke City Gladiators	3	13		.188		3–11	625	740	W1
Tucson Sugar Skulls	2	14		.125		2–13	565	723	L9

==== Power rankings ====
IFL Power Rankings
Pre	1	2	3	4	5	6	7	8	9	10	11	12	13	14	15	16	17	18	19
