= Travis Partridge =

American football player and coach (born 1990)

North Alabama Lions
- Title: Offensive coordinator & quarterbacks coach

Personal information
- Born: September 22, 1990 (age 36); St. Joseph, Missouri, U.S.
- Listed height: 6 ft 4 in (1.93 m)
- Listed weight: 230 lb (104 kg)

Career information
- Position: Quarterback (No. 19)
- High school: Savannah (MO)
- College: Missouri Western
- NFL draft: 2014: undrafted

Career history

Playing
- Minnesota Vikings (2014)*; BC Lions (2014–2015); Hudson Valley Fort (2015); Logan Wolverines (2016)*; Iowa Barnstormers (2016–2017)
- * Offseason or practice squad member only

Coaching
- Delta State (2017) Graduate assistant; UT Martin (2018) Quarterbacks coach; Kansas (2019–2021) Offensive quality control; UT Martin (2022–2023) Pass game coordinator and quarterbacks coach; Tennessee State (2024) Offensive coordinator and quarterbacks coach; Bowling Green (2025) Offensive coordinator and quarterbacks coach; North Alabama (2026–present) Offensive coordinator and quarterbacks coach

Awards and highlights
- Second-team All-IFL (2017); IFL Most Improved Player (2017); First team All-MIAA (2012)

Career CFL statistics
- Rushing attempts: 5
- Rushing yards: 9
- Rushing TDs: 1
- Stats at CFL.ca (archive)

Travis Partridge (born September 22, 1990) is an American college football coach and former quarterback. He played college football at Missouri Western State University and attended Savannah High School in Savannah, Missouri. He was also a member of the Minnesota Vikings, BC Lions, Hudson Valley Fort, Logan Wolverines, and Iowa Barnstormers.

== College career ==
Partridge played for the Missouri Western Griffons from 2009 to 2013. He was the team's starter his final three years and helped the Griffons to 29 wins. He recorded career totals of 6,754 passing yards and 70 touchdowns on 1,561 completions. He also accumulated 1,561 rushing yards and 36 touchdowns on 410 rushing attempts.

== Professional career ==
Pre-draft measurables
Height	Weight	40-yard dash	10-yard split	20-yard split	20-yard shuttle	Three-cone drill	Vertical jump	Broad jump
6 ft 3 in (1.91 m)	237 lb (108 kg)	4.81 s	1.71 s	2.75 s	4.41 s	7.12 s	30 in (0.76 m)	9 ft 4 in (2.84 m)
All values from Missouri Western Pro Day

Partridge was signed by the Minnesota Vikings on May 11, 2014. He was released on May 19.

Partidge was signed by the BC Lions on May 28, 2014. He dressed for fourteen games during the 2014 season and saw limited action in short-yardage situations as the third-string quarterback. He scored his first CFL touchdown on a one-yard run against the Montreal Alouettes on July 19, 2014. Partidge took over for Kevin Glenn during the Eastern Semi-Final against the Montreal Alouettes, completing seven of eleven pass attempts for 38 yards and two touchdowns. He was released by the Lions June 14, 2015.

Partridge joined the Hudson Valley Fort of the FXFL on September 28, 2015.

Partridge was signed by the Logan Wolverines of the National Gridiron League on May 14, 2016.

On May 23, 2016, Partridge signed with the Iowa Barnstormers of the Indoor Football League (IFL). Partridge re-signed with the Barnstormers for the 2017 season. He was named Second Team All-IFL and the IFL's Most Improved Player in 2017.

== Coaching career ==
In 2017, Partridge spent the season as a graduate assistant Delta State, working primarily with the quarterbacks. While at Delta State, the Statesmen posted a 9–4 mark while finishing tied for second in the Gulf Coast Conference standings. Offensively, the squad averaged 30.1 points per game while scoring 50 offensive touchdowns.

In 2018, Partridge was hired as quarterbacks coach at UT Martin.

On May 4, 2019, Partridge was hired as offensive quality control coach at the University of Kansas joining the staff of Les Miles.

In January 2022, Partridge returned to UT Martin as the quarterbacks coach and pass game coordinator.

On March 7, 2024, Partridge was hired as the offensive coordinator and quarterbacks coach at Tennessee State University.

Patridge followed Eddie George after he was appointed as the new head coach of the Bowling Green Falcons. Partridge will serve as the offensive coordinator and quarterbacks coach.

== Personal life ==
Partridge is the son of current Northwestern Oklahoma State head coach Jerry Partridge.
