= Lamar Mady =

American football player (born 1990)

No. 94 – Arizona Rattlers
- Position: Center
- Roster status: Active

Personal information
- Born: December 13, 1990 (age 35); Omaha, Nebraska, U.S.
- Listed height: 6 ft 2 in (1.88 m)
- Listed weight: 317 lb (144 kg)

Career information
- High school: Topeka (Topeka, Kansas)
- College: Youngstown State
- NFL draft: 2013: undrafted

Career history
- Oakland Raiders (2013–2014); Hudson Valley Fort (2015); Arizona Rattlers (2016–present)

Awards and highlights
- United Bowl champion (2017); IFL National Champion (2024); 2× First-team All-IFL (2017, 2018); Second-team All-IFL (2023)

Career NFL statistics
- Games played: 7
- Stats at Pro Football Reference

Lamar Mady (born December 13, 1990) is an American professional football center for the Arizona Rattlers of the Indoor Football League (IFL). He was signed by the Oakland Raiders as an undrafted free agent in 2013. He played college football for the Youngstown State Penguins.

== Professional career ==
Pre-draft measurables
Height	Weight	Arm length	Hand span	40-yard dash	20-yard shuttle	Three-cone drill	Vertical jump	Broad jump	Bench press
6 ft 2 in (1.88 m)	317 lb (144 kg)	33 1/2	9 3/8	5.48 s	4.82 s	8.07 s	23.0 in (0.58 m)	7 ft 11 in (2.41 m)	35 reps
All values from NFL Combine

=== Oakland Raiders ===
On September 2, 2013, before the beginning of the National Football League 2013 regular season, the Oakland Raiders sign undrafted free agent guard Lamar Mady to their practice squad.

On September 23, 2013 the Oakland Raiders activate Lamar Mady from the practice squad to their active roster due to injuries on the Raiders offensive line.

On September 1, 2015, Mady was waived by the Raiders.

=== Hudson Valley Fort ===
During the Fall of 2015, Mady played for the Hudson Valley Fort of the Fall Experimental Football League.

=== Arizona Rattlers ===
On November 5, 2015, Mady was assigned to the Arizona Rattlers of the Arena Football League. On November 16, 2016, Mady re-signed with the Rattlers as they transition into the Indoor Football League. Mady was named First-team All-Indoor Football League as a center following the 2017 season. On July 8, the Rattlers defeated the Sioux Falls Storm in the United Bowl by a score of 50–41. He re-signed with the Rattlers on August 28, 2017.
