= Marco Thomas =

American gridiron football player (born 1983)

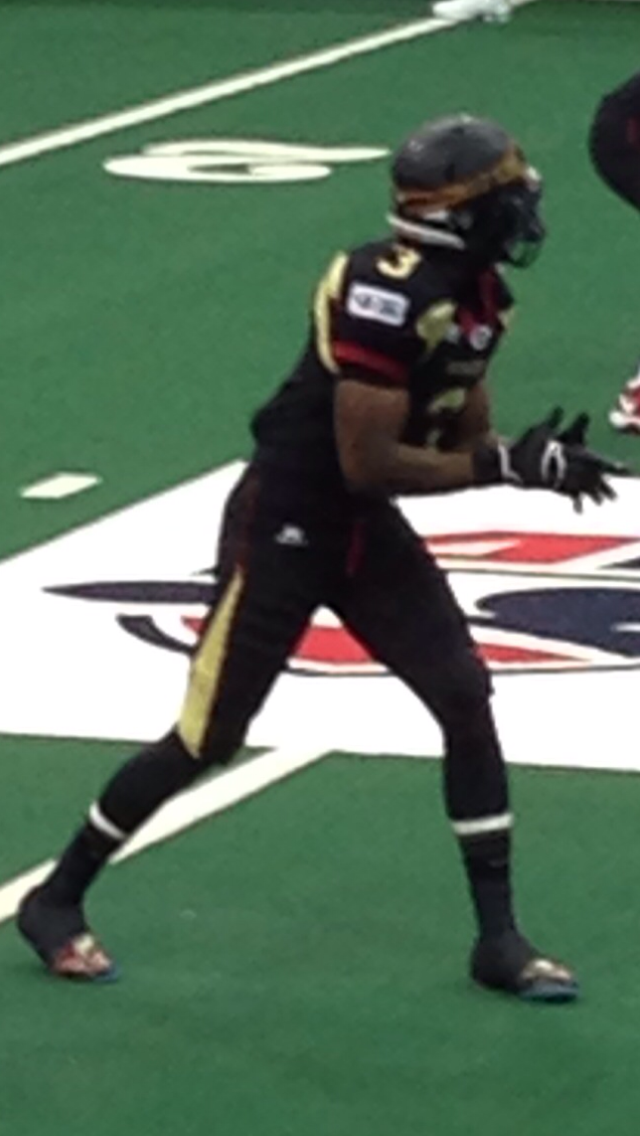
- Thomas with the Iowa Barnstormers in 2013

No. 3, 84
- Position: Wide receiver

Personal information
- Born: November 27, 1983 (age 42); Chicago, Illinois, U.S.
- Listed height: 5 ft 11 in (1.80 m)
- Listed weight: 190 lb (86 kg)

Career information
- High school: Chicago (IL) Bogan
- College: Western Illinois
- NFL draft: 2007: undrafted

Career history
- New York Giants (2007)*; Oakland Raiders (2007)*; New York Jets (2007–2008)*; San Diego Chargers (2008)*; Montreal Alouettes (2008–2009); Chicago Rush (2010–2011); San Jose SaberCats (2011); Iowa Barnstormers (2012–2014); Philadelphia Soul (2015)
- * Offseason or practice squad member only

Awards and highlights
- First-team All-Arena (2014); Wide Receiver of the Year (2014); Second-team All-Arena (2015)

Career AFL statistics
- Receptions: 672
- Receiving yards: 7,666
- Receiving touchdowns: 138
- Rushing yards: 209
- Rushing touchdowns: 8
- Stats at ArenaFan.com
- Stats at CFL.ca (archive)

Marco Thomas (born November 27, 1983) is an American former professional football wide receiver. He was signed by the New York Giants as an undrafted free agent in 2007. He played college football at Western Illinois.

Thomas was also a member of the Oakland Raiders, New York Jets, San Diego Chargers, Montreal Alouettes, Chicago Rush, San Jose SaberCats, Iowa Barnstormers, and Philadelphia Soul.

== College career ==
Thomas was a member of the Western Illinois University Leathernecks. In 43 games, he caught 109 passes for 1,691 yards and 11 touchdowns

== Professional career ==
=== NFL ===
Thomas began his NFL career as an undrafted free agent for the New York Giants. He also spent time with the New York Jets from 2007–08 and both the Oakland Raiders and San Diego Chargers in 2008.

=== Arena Football League ===
Thomas began his Arena Football League career with the Chicago Rush in 2010. Chicago picked up Thomas at the end of the season. He caught 25 passes for 323 yards and two touchdowns before a knee injury ended his season. In 2011, he returned to the Rush and caught 16 passes for 140 yards and one touchdown before being released. After his release, he joined the San Jose SaberCats. In 2014, Thomas was named First-team All-Arena as well as the Wide Receiver of the Year. On March 15, 2015, Thomas was assigned to the Philadelphia Soul.

=== Career receiving statistics ===
Year	Team	Games	Rec	Yards	Y/R	TDs
2010	Chicago Rush	16	25	323	12.9	2
2011	Chicago Rush	9	16	140	8.8	1
2011	San Jose Sabercats	9	45	398	8.8	5
2012	Iowa Barnstormers	18	138	1523	11.0	21
