= 2018 Cedar Rapids Titans season =

Indoor Football League team season

- Owner: Chris Kokalis; Bob Sullivan; David Bradley; Kenneth Moninski
- General manager: Chris Kokalis
- Head coach: Marvin Jones
- Home stadium: U.S. Cellular Center

Results
- Record: 3–11
- League place: 5th
- Playoffs: Did not qualify

The 2018 Cedar Rapids Titans season is the team's seventh season as a professional indoor football franchise and seventh in the Indoor Football League (IFL). One of six teams that compete in the IFL for the 2018 season.

Led by head coach Marvin Jones, the Titans play their home games at the U.S. Cellular Center in downtown Cedar Rapids, Iowa.

== Standings ==
2018 Indoor Football League
	W	L	PCT	PF	PA	GB	STK
y-Iowa Barnstormers	11	3	.786	648	493	—	W1
x-Arizona Rattlers	11	3	.786	746	567	—	W1
x-Sioux Falls Storm	11	3	.786	724	577	—	W5
x-Nebraska Danger	4	10	.286	525	592	7	L9
Cedar Rapids Titans	3	11	.214	543	733	8	L1
Green Bay Blizzard	2	12	.143	421	645	9	L4

y - clinched regular season title

x - clinched playoff spot

== Staff ==
2018 Cedar Rapids Titans staff
Front office: Co-owner/general manager – Chris Kokalis; Co-owner – Bob Sullivan; Co-owner – David Bradley; Co-owner – Kenneth Moninski; Co-owner – Barry, Toni and Alexis Smith; Director of player personnel – N/A	Coaches: Head coach – Marvin Jones; Defensive coordinator – Marvin Jones

=== Regular season ===
Key: Win Tie Loss Bye

Week	Day	Date	Kickoff	Opponent	Results		Location	Attendance
Week	Day	Date	Kickoff	Opponent	Score	Record	Location	Attendance
1	Friday	February 23	7:00pm	at Nebraska Danger	L 33–39	0–1	Eihusen Arena	
2	Friday	March 2	7:05pm	Green Bay Blizzard	W 47–39	1–1	U.S. Cellular Center	
3	Monday	March 12	6:05pm	at Sioux Falls Storm	L 33–70	1–2	Denny Sanford Premier Center	
4	Monday	March 19	7:05pm	Nebraska Danger	L 41–50	1–3	U.S. Cellular Center	
5	Saturday	March 24	7:05pm	Iowa Barnstormers	L 45–59	1–4	U.S. Cellular Center	
6	Saturday	March 31	8:05pm	at Arizona Rattlers	L 19–54	1–5	Talking Stick Resort Arena	11,155
7	BYE							
8	Sunday	April 15	3:05pm	Green Bay Blizzard	Indefinitely postponed (Note: Due to a severe blizzard, the game was postponed but not rescheduled)		Resch Center	—
9	Saturday	April 21	7:05pm	at Sioux Falls Storm	L 48–65	1–6	Denny Sanford Premier Center	
10	Saturday	April 28	8:05pm	at Arizona Rattlers	L 83–84	1–7	Talking Stick Resort Arena	16,742
11	Saturday	May 5	7:05pm	Arizona Rattlers	L 42–57	1–8	U.S. Cellular Center	
12	Friday	May 11	7:05pm	at Iowa Barnstormers	L 21–48	1–9	Wells Fargo Arena	
13	Friday	May 18	7:05pm	Sioux Falls Storm	L 45–56	1–10	U.S. Cellular Center	
14	BYE							
15	Saturday	June 2	7:05pm	Nebraska Danger	W 33–26	2–10	U.S. Cellular Center	
16	Saturday	June 9	7:05pm	at Green Bay Blizzard	W 34–27	3–10	Resch Center	
17	Saturday	June 16	7:05pm	at Iowa Barnstormers	L 21–54	3–11	Wells Fargo Arena	

== Roster ==
2018 Cedar Rapids Titans roster
Quarterbacks: 5 Jake Medlock; Running backs: 25 Raphael Lawson-Gayle; 48 Tyler Scalzi; Wide receivers: 7 Javon Bell; 1 Conner Hollenbeck; 11 Raheem Harvey; 17 Jordan Smith; 3 Marquel Wade	Offensive linemen: 65 Sean Brown; 62 Randall Harris; 72 Andrew Erbes; Defensive linemen: 54 Ricarlo Bell; 99 Dequan Ivery; 72 Marcus Haynes; 42 Timothy Hamilton	Linebackers: 8 Raheem Bramwell; 44 Moses White; Defensive backs: 22 Justin Barnes; 6 James Calhoun; 2 E. J. Frain; 20 Elijah Lee; 23 Danzel McDaniel; Special teams: 4 Michael Georgetti	Reserve lists: -- Ify Asoluka DB (IR); 2 Cedric Dozier DB (IR/DFR); 60 Andrew Erbes OL (DNR); -- Herbert Gonzales III DL (DNR); 18 Connor Hollenbeck WR (IR/DFR); 22 Tyler Thomas RB (DNR); Roster updated May 16, 2018; 23 Active, 6 Inactive
