= 2018 Arizona Rattlers season =

Indoor football season

- Owner: Ron Shurts
- General manager: Kevin Guy
- Head coach: Kevin Guy
- Home stadium: Talking Stick Resort Arena

Results
- Record: 11–3
- League place: 2nd
- Playoffs: Lost semifinal

The 2018 Arizona Rattlers season is the twenty-sixth season for the professional indoor football franchise and second in the Indoor Football League (IFL). Led by head coach Kevin Guy, the Rattlers play their home games at Talking Stick Resort Arena in Phoenix, Arizona.

== Standings ==
2018 Indoor Football League
	W	L	PCT	PF	PA	GB	STK
y-Iowa Barnstormers	11	3	.786	648	493	—	W1
x-Arizona Rattlers	11	3	.786	746	567	—	W1
x-Sioux Falls Storm	11	3	.786	724	577	—	W5
x-Nebraska Danger	4	10	.286	525	592	7	L9
Cedar Rapids Titans	3	11	.214	543	733	8	L1
Green Bay Blizzard	2	12	.143	421	645	9	L4

y - clinched regular season title

x - clinched playoff spot

== Schedule ==
=== Regular season ===
Key: Win Tie Loss Bye

Week	Day	Date	Kickoff	Opponent	Results		Location	Attendance
Week	Day	Date	Kickoff	Opponent	Score	Record	Location	Attendance
1	Sunday	February 25	3:05pm	Sioux Falls Storm	W 39–33	1–0	Talking Stick Resort Arena	12,477
2	BYE							
3	Saturday	March 10	6:05pm	at Iowa Barnstormers	L 28–38	1–1	Wells Fargo Arena	5,874
4	Sunday	March 18	3:05pm	Green Bay Blizzard	W 37–31	2–1	Talking Stick Resort Arena	
5	Saturday	March 24	6:05pm	Nebraska Danger	W 62–49	3–1	Talking Stick Resort Arena	9,763
6	Saturday	March 31	6:05pm	Cedar Rapids Titans	W 54–19	4–1	Talking Stick Resort Arena	11,155
7	BYE							
8	Monday	April 16	6:05pm	at Sioux Falls Storm	W 48–40	5–1	Denny Sanford Premier Center	
9	Saturday	April 21	6:05pm	Green Bay Blizzard	W 65–33	6–1	Talking Stick Resort Arena	13,825
10	Saturday	April 28	6:05pm	Cedar Rapids Titans	W 84–83	7–1	Talking Stick Resort Arena	16,742
11	Saturday	May 5	5:05pm	at Cedar Rapids Titans	W 57–42	8–1	U.S. Cellular Center	
12	Saturday	May 12	5:05pm	at Green Bay Blizzard	W 62–26	9–1	Resch Center	
13	Sunday	May 20	3:05pm	Iowa Barnstormers	L 68–69 OT	9–2	Talking Stick Resort Arena	18,381
14	Sunday	May 27	3:05pm	Nebraska Danger	W 45–40	10–2	Talking Stick Resort Arena	
15	Saturday	June 2	5:05pm	at Iowa Barnstormers	L 38–41	10–3	Wells Fargo Arena	
16	BYE							
17	Saturday	June 16	5:00pm	at Nebraska Danger	W 59–23	11–3	Eihusen Arena	

=== Postseason ===
Round	Day	Date	Kickoff	Opponent	Score	Location
Semifinal	Saturday	June 23	7:05pm	Sioux Falls Storm	L 68–69 OT	Talking Stick Resort Arena

== Final roster ==
Arizona Rattlers roster
Quarterbacks: 1 Verlon Reed; 13 Jeff Ziemba; Running backs: 32 Dylan Peebles; 28 Shadrach Thornton; Wide receivers: 5 Anthony Amos; 17 Dezmon Epps; 16 Jarrod Harrington; 12 Anthony Jones Jr.; 2 Jamal Miles; 15 Dillion Winfrey	Offensive linemen: 50 Chris Boles; 56 Steven Gurrola; 94 Lamar Mady; 64 Vernon Sainvil; Defensive linemen: 95 Joshua Gordon; 91 Justin Martin; 31 Chris McAllister; 97 Terrance Surratt	Linebackers: 30 Justin Shirk; Defensive backs: 11 Arkeith Brown; -- Yogi Hale; 4 Nathan Lindsey; 8 Davontae Merriweather; 24 Keith Trumps; Kickers: 22 Sawyer Petre	Reserve list: 3 Allen Chapman DB (IR); -- Fahraad Johnson OL (IR); 45 Ryan Langford LB (IR); -- Lene Maiava OL (IR); 14 Darrell Monroe RB (IR); 49 Edward Mosley DL (IR); -- Mark Munson WR (IR); Rookies in italics; Roster updated May 17, 2018; 25 Active, 7 Inactive; → More rosters
