= 2018 Nebraska Danger season =

Indoor Football League team season

- Owner: Charlie Bosselman; Laurie Bosselman; Brandi Bosselman
- Head coach: Mark Stoute (fired May 20); Adam Shackleford/Pig Brown (interim co-coaches)
- Home stadium: Eihusen Arena

Results
- Record: 4–10
- League place: 4th
- Playoffs: Lost IFL Semifinal 17–48 (Barnstormers)

The 2018 Nebraska Danger season was the eighth season for the Nebraska Danger as a professional indoor football franchise and their eighth in the Indoor Football League (IFL). They were one of six teams that competed in the IFL for the 2018 season. The Danger played in the Eihusen Arena at the Heartland Events Center in Grand Island, Nebraska.

The Danger were led by head coach Mark Stoute in his first season with the Danger but was released on May 20 after losing six straight games. He was replaced for the rest of the season by coordinators Adam Shackleford and Pig Brown as co-coaches.

Despite losing their final nine games, the Dangers still made the four-team playoff and lost to the Iowa Barnstormers 48–17 in the league semifinal. After the season was complete, interim co-coach Pig Brown was promoted to the full-time head coach.

== Standings ==
2018 Indoor Football League
	W	L	PCT	PF	PA	GB	STK
y-Iowa Barnstormers	11	3	.786	648	493	—	W1
x-Arizona Rattlers	11	3	.786	746	567	—	W1
x-Sioux Falls Storm	11	3	.786	724	577	—	W5
x-Nebraska Danger	4	10	.286	525	592	7	L9
Cedar Rapids Titans	3	11	.214	543	733	8	L1
Green Bay Blizzard	2	12	.143	421	645	9	L4

y - clinched regular season title

x - clinched playoff spot

== Schedule ==
Key: Win Tie Loss Bye

=== Regular season ===
All start times are local time

Week	Day	Date	Kickoff	Opponent	Results		Location	Attendance
Week	Day	Date	Kickoff	Opponent	Score	Record	Location	Attendance
1	Friday	February 23	2:30pm	Cedar Rapids Titans	W 44–31	1–0	Eihusen Arena	
2	BYE							
3	Sunday	March 11	3:00pm	Green Bay Blizzard	W 59–23	2–0	Eihusen Arena	
4	Monday	March 19	7:05pm	at Cedar Rapids Titans	W 50–41	3–0	U.S. Cellular Center	
5	Saturday	March 24	8:05pm	at Arizona Rattlers	L 49–62	3–1	Talking Stick Resort Arena	9,763
6	Friday	March 30	7:00pm	Iowa Barnstormers	W 43–32	4–1	Eihusen Arena	
7	Saturday	April 7	7:00pm	Sioux Falls Storm	L 37–45	4–2	Eihusen Arena	
8	Saturday	April 14	7:05pm	at Iowa Barnstormers	L 25–41	4–3	Wells Fargo Arena	
9	BYE							
10	Friday	April 27	7:00pm	Sioux Falls Storm	L 48–62	4–4	Eihusen Arena	
11	Saturday	May 5	7:05pm	at Green Bay Blizzard	L 25–47	4–5	Resch Center	
12	Saturday	May 12	7:05pm	at Sioux Falls Storm	L 36–40	4–6	Denny Sanford Premier Center	
13	Friday	May 18	7:00pm	Green Bay Blizzard	L 20–31	4–7	Eihusen Arena	
14	Sunday	May 27	5:05pm	at Arizona Rattlers	L 40–45	4–8	Talking Stick Resort Arena	
15	Saturday	June 2	7:05pm	at Cedar Rapids Titans	L 26–33	4–9	U.S. Cellular Center	
16	BYE							
17	Saturday	June 16	7:00pm	Arizona Rattlers	L 23–59	4–10	Eihusen Arena	

=== Postseason ===
Round	Day	Date	Kickoff	Opponent	Score	Location
Semifinal	Friday	June 22	7:05pm	at Iowa Barnstormers	L 17–48	Wells Fargo Arena

== Roster ==
Nebraska Danger roster
Quarterbacks: 10 Greg Hankerson; Running backs: 6 Angelo Pease; 21 Korey Ringer; Wide receivers: 5 Gregory Dent Jr.; 9 Kenzel Doe; 88 Jarred Haggins; 4 Eric Thomas	Offensive linemen: 65 Mason Butler; 72 Devonte McClain; 76 Drake Miller; 76 Torian White; Defensive linemen: 43 Davion Belk; 56 Darrien Howard; 93 Xzavie Jackson; 56 Phillip Lewis; 91 Denzell Perine	Linebackers: 24 Nakevion Leslie; 44 Myke Tavarres; Defensive backs: 2 Najee Bright; 26 Cornelius Brown; 15 Jamaal Burgess; 17 Rahman Kamara; 8 Darion Monroe; Special teams: 22 Brad Hatfield K	Reserve lists: 1 Nick Brassell WR (IR/DFR); 43 Tavita Faaiu DL (DNR); 7 Damien Fleming QB (IR); -- Darrin Reaves RB (IR); -- Michael Thornton RB (IR); 71 Palmer White OL (DNR); Roster updated May 10, 2018; 24 Active, 6 Inactive; → More rosters

== Staff ==
Nebraska Danger staff
Front office: Owner / president – Charlie Bosselman; Owner – Laurie Bosselman; Owner – Brandi Bosselman; COO – Brian Fausch; Director of marketing – Stephanie King; Sales – Gus Patsios	Head coach: Head coach – Vacant; Offensive coaches: Associate head coach - Adam Shackleford (interim co-coach); Offensive linemen – Kyle Moore-Brown; Quarterbacks coach – Jameel Sewell; Defensive coaches: Defensive coordinator – Pig Brown (interim co-coach); Defensive linemen – Adrian Davis; Special teams coaches: Special teams coordinator – Adrian Davis
