= 2018 Green Bay Blizzard season =

Indoor Football League team season

- Owner: Larry Treankler; Kathy Treankler
- Head coach: Chris Williams (fired March 29); Corey Roberson (interim)
- Home stadium: Resch Center; 1901 South Oneida Street; Green Bay, Wisconsin 54304

Results
- Record: 2–12
- League place: 6th
- Playoffs: Did not qualify

The 2018 Green Bay Blizzard season was the team's sixteenth season as a professional indoor football franchise and ninth in the Indoor Football League (IFL). The Blizzard were one of six teams that competed in the IFL for the 2018 season.

The Blizzard played their home games at the Resch Center in the Green Bay suburb of Ashwaubenon, Wisconsin. For the first five games, the team was coached by Chris Williams in his third season with the team. Williams was fired March 29 after going 0–5. Special teams and defensive coach Corey Roberson took over as the interim head coach.

== Standings ==
2018 Indoor Football League
| | W | L | PCT | PF | PA | GB | STK |
|---|---|---|---|---|---|---|---|
| y-Iowa Barnstormers | 11 | 3 | .786 | 648 | 493 | — | W1 |
| x-Arizona Rattlers | 11 | 3 | .786 | 746 | 567 | — | W1 |
| x-Sioux Falls Storm | 11 | 3 | .786 | 724 | 577 | — | W5 |
| x-Nebraska Danger | 4 | 10 | .286 | 525 | 592 | 7 | L9 |
| Cedar Rapids Titans | 3 | 11 | .214 | 543 | 733 | 8 | L1 |
| Green Bay Blizzard | 2 | 12 | .143 | 421 | 645 | 9 | L4 |

y - clinched regular season title

x - clinched playoff spot

== Schedule ==
Key: Win Tie Loss Bye

=== Regular season ===
All start times are local

| Week | Day | Date | Kickoff | Opponent | Results | | Location | Attendance |
| Week | Day | Date | Kickoff | Opponent | Score | Record | Location | Attendance |
|---|---|---|---|---|---|---|---|---|
| 1 | Sunday | February 25 | 3:05pm | Iowa Barnstormers | L 20–41 | 0–1 | Resch Center | 5,158 |
| 2 | Friday | March 2 | 7:05pm | at Cedar Rapids Titans | L 39–47 | 0–2 | U.S. Cellular Center | |
| 3 | Sunday | March 11 | 3:00pm | at Nebraska Danger | L 23–59 | 0–3 | Eihusen Arena | |
| 4 | Sunday | March 18 | 5:05pm | at Arizona Rattlers | L 31–37 | 0–4 | Talking Stick Resort Arena | |
| 5 | Saturday | March 24 | 7:05pm | Sioux Falls Storm | L 23–39 | 0–5 | Resch Center | 5,356 |
| 6 | BYE | | | | | | | |
| 7 | BYE | | | | | | | |
| 8 | Sunday | April 15 | 3:05pm | Cedar Rapids Titans | Indefinitely postponed (Note: Due to a severe blizzard, the game was postponed but not rescheduled) | | Resch Center | — |
| 9 | Saturday | April 21 | 8:05pm | at Arizona Rattlers | L 33–65 | 0–6 | Talking Stick Resort Arena | 13,825 |
| 10 | Saturday | April 28 | 7:05pm | at Iowa Barnstormers | L 25–46 | 0–7 | Wells Fargo Arena | 5,921 |
| 11 | Saturday | May 5 | 7:05pm | Nebraska Danger | W 47–25 | 1–7 | Resch Center | |
| 12 | Saturday | May 12 | 7:05pm | Arizona Rattlers | L 26–62 | 1–8 | Resch Center | |
| 13 | Friday | May 18 | 7:00pm | at Nebraska Danger | W 31–20 | 2–8 | Eihusen Arena | |
| 14 | Friday | May 25 | 7:05pm | at Iowa Barnstormers | L 14–41 | 2–9 | Wells Fargo Arena | |
| 15 | Friday | June 1 | 7:05pm | Sioux Falls Storm | L 21–60 | 2–10 | Resch Center | |
| 16 | Saturday | June 9 | 7:05pm | Cedar Rapids Titans | L 27–34 | 2–11 | Resch Center | |
| 17 | Saturday | June 16 | 7:05pm | at Sioux Falls Storm | L 61–69 OT | 2–12 | Denny Sanford Premier Center | |

== Roster ==
Green Bay Blizzard roster
| Quarterbacks: 14 Bryan Hicks; 13 Tyler Johnson; Running backs: 34 Robert Metz; Wide receivers: 1 Jereme Jones; -- Tim Lukas; 5 Chris Malott; 12 Andre McDonald; 16 Kezlow Smith | Offensive linemen: 56 Xavier Dampeer; 77 Khalil Hunter; 69 D'Mon Tucker; 79 Donovan Williams; Defensive linemen: 15 Brandon Boudreaux; 50 Deldrick Canty; 99 Cory Grissom; 94 Issac Gross; 17 Rykeem Yates | Linebackers: 14 Broderick Fordham; 22 Akim Francis; Defensive backs: 2 Manny Asprila; 8 Jeff Hall; 3 B. J. Hill; 21 Josh Jenkins; 6 Darrius Sims; 24 Robert Taylor; Special teams: 18 Jordan Endries | Reserve lists: 10 Levi Copelin WR (IR); 55 Sean Daniels DL (Exempt); 7 Josh Francis LB (DNR); 94 Jimmy Jean DL (IR); 4 Tyler Williams DB (IR); 77 Kenneth Woodget OL (IR); Rookies in italics; Roster updated March 3, 2018; 26 active, 6 inactive; → More rosters |
