= 2018 Iowa Barnstormers season =

Indoor Football League team season

- Owner: Jeff Lamberti
- General manager: John Pettit
- Head coach: Dixie Wooten
- Home stadium: Wells Fargo Arena

Results
- Record: 11–3
- League place: 1st

The 2018 Iowa Barnstormers season was the team's eighteenth season as a professional indoor football franchise and fourth in the Indoor Football League (IFL). They were one of six teams that competed in the IFL for the 2018 season. The Barnstormers were members of the United Conference in previous seasons, but due to the loss of several teams in the offseason, there was no conference alignment for the 2018 season.

Led by second-year head coach Dixie Wooten, the Barnstormers played their home games at the Wells Fargo Arena in the Des Moines, Iowa. On July 7, 2018, the Barnstormers won the United Bowl, the first championship in the club's history.

== Standings ==
2018 Indoor Football League
	W	L	PCT	PF	PA	GB	STK
y-Iowa Barnstormers	11	3	.786	648	493	—	W1
x-Arizona Rattlers	11	3	.786	746	567	—	W1
x-Sioux Falls Storm	11	3	.786	724	577	—	W5
x-Nebraska Danger	4	10	.286	525	592	7	L9
Cedar Rapids Titans	3	11	.214	543	733	8	L1
Green Bay Blizzard	2	12	.143	421	645	9	L4

y - clinched regular season title

x - clinched playoff spot

== Staff ==
2018 Iowa Barnstormers staff
Front office: Principal owner – Jeff Lamberti; Owner/Vice President/COO – John Pettit; Owner – Don Lamberti; Honorary owner – Ben Silverstein; Owner – David Silverstein; Owner – Scott Thurber; Owner – Dave Knau; Owner – Jim Gocke; Owner – Dan Stanbrough; Owner – Jeff Lipman; Owner – Tom Nelson; Owner – Dan Ochylski; Owner – Brian Chittenden	Head coach - Dixie Wooten Offensive coaches: Assistant head coach / Asst Offensive Coordinator/WR coach –Hurtis Chinn; Defensive coaches: Defensive coordinator / defensive backs coach – Marcus Coleman; Special teams coordinator / defensive line coach – Malcolm Nelson; Strength & conditioning: Rodney Filer

== Schedule ==
Key: Win Tie Loss Bye

=== Regular season ===
All start times are local.

Week	Day	Date	Kickoff	Opponent	Results		Location	Attendance
Week	Day	Date	Kickoff	Opponent	Score	Record	Location	Attendance
1	Sunday	February 25	3:05 PM	at Green Bay Blizzard	W 41–20	1–0	Resch Center	5,158
2	BYE							
3	Saturday	March 10	7:05 PM	Arizona Rattlers	W 38–28	2–0	Wells Fargo Arena	5,874
4	Sunday	March 18	3:05 PM	Sioux Falls Storm	L 40–52	2–1	Wells Fargo Arena	5,163
5	Sunday	March 24	7:03 PM	at Cedar Rapids Titans	W 59–45	3–1	U.S. Cellular Center	
6	Friday	March 30	7:00 PM	at Nebraska Danger	L 32–43	3–2	Eihusen Arena	
7	BYE							
8	Saturday	April 14	7:05 PM	Nebraska Danger	W 41–25	4–2	Wells Fargo Arena	
9	BYE							
10	Saturday	April 28	7:05 PM	Green Bay Blizzard	W 46–25	5–2	Wells Fargo Arena	5,921
11	Saturday	May 5	7:05 pm	at Sioux Falls Storm	W 49–42	6–2	Denny Sanford Premier Center	
12	Friday	May 11	7:05 PM	Cedar Rapids Titans	W 48–21	7–2	Wells Fargo Arena	
13	Sunday	May 20	3:05 PM	at Arizona Rattlers	W 69–68 OT	8–2	Talking Stick Resort Arena	18,381
14	Friday	May 25	7:05 PM	Green Bay Blizzard	W 41–14	9–2	Wells Fargo Arena	
15	Saturday	June 2	7:05 PM	Arizona Rattlers	W 41–38	10–2	Wells Fargo Arena	
16	Friday	June 8	7:05 PM	at Sioux Falls Storm	L 49–51	10–3	Denny Sanford Premier Center	
17	Saturday	June 16	7:05 PM	Cedar Rapids Titans	W 54–21	11–3	Wells Fargo Arena	

=== Postseason ===
Round	Day	Date	Kickoff	Opponent	Score	Location
Semifinal	Friday	June 22	7:05pm	Nebraska Danger	W 48–17	Wells Fargo Arena
United Bowl	Saturday	July 7	7:00pm	Sioux Falls Storm	W 42–38	Wells Fargo Arena
