= 2019 Indoor Football League season =

2019 IFL season
- League: Indoor Football League
- Sport: Indoor football
- Duration: February 22 – July 13
- Teams: 10

Regular season
- Top seed: Arizona Rattlers
- Season MVP: Daquan Neal (Iowa Barnstormers)

Playoffs
- Finals champions: Sioux Falls Storm
- Runners-up: Arizona Rattlers
- Finals MVP: Lorenzo Brown (Storm)

IFL seasons
- ← 2018 2020 →

The 2019 Indoor Football League season was the eleventh of the Indoor Football League (IFL). The league played this season with ten teams, up from six the previous season, by adding two expansion teams and two teams from Champions Indoor Football.

The top six teams made the IFL playoffs, with the first round consisting of the top two seeds earning byes, the third seed hosting the sixth seed, and the fourth hosting the fifth seed. In the semifinals, the top seed hosted the lower remaining seed and the second hosting the higher-seeded winner from the first round. The semifinal winners met in the 2019 United Bowl on the weekend of July 13.

== Offseason ==
In August 2018, the IFL announced the first 2019 expansion team, the Tucson Sugar Skulls, owned by Arizona Rattlers' head coach Kevin Guy. On September 7, the IFL announced the Quad City Steamwheelers had joined the league from Champions Indoor Football (CIF). On October 5, the Bismarck Bucks of the CIF also announced their move to the IFL.

During the previous season, the Cedar Rapids Titans were sold to Roy Choi and the team was rebranded as Cedar Rapids River Kings for the 2019 season. In November 2018, Choi also launched a second 2019 IFL expansion team called the San Diego Strike Force.

== Teams ==
Team	Location	Arena	Head coach
Arizona Rattlers	Phoenix, Arizona	Talking Stick Resort Arena	Kevin Guy
Bismarck Bucks	Bismarck, North Dakota	Bismarck Event Center	Rod Miller
Cedar Rapids River Kings	Cedar Rapids, Iowa	U.S. Cellular Center	Mark Stoute
Green Bay Blizzard	Green Bay, Wisconsin	Resch Center	Corey Roberson
Iowa Barnstormers	Des Moines, Iowa	Wells Fargo Arena	Dixie Wooten
Nebraska Danger	Grand Island, Nebraska	Eihusen Arena	Pig Brown
Quad City Steamwheelers	Moline, Illinois	TaxSlayer Center	Cory Ross
San Diego Strike Force	San Diego, California	Pechanga Arena	Burt Grossman
Sioux Falls Storm	Sioux Falls, South Dakota	Denny Sanford Premier Center	Kurtiss Riggs
Tucson Sugar Skulls	Tucson, Arizona	Tucson Convention Center	Marcus Coleman

== Standings ==
2019 Indoor Football League
	W	L	PCT	PF	PA	GB
z–Arizona Rattlers	14	0	1.000	879	510	—
y–Iowa Barnstormers	12	2	.857	716	522	2.0
x–Sioux Falls Storm	11	3	.786	738	589	3.0
x–Green Bay Blizzard	9	5	.643	590	521	5.0
x–Nebraska Danger	7	7	.500	714	656	7.0
x–Tucson Sugar Skulls	7	7	.500	728	705	7.0
Quad City Steamwheelers	6	8	.429	709	650	8.0
Bismarck Bucks	2	12	.143	474	751	12.0
Cedar Rapids River Kings	1	13	.071	413	730	13.0
San Diego Strike Force	1	13	.071	524	851	13.0

z – clinched regular season title

y – clinched playoff bye

x – clinched playoff spot

Last updated: 06/15/2019

== Playoffs ==
First Round
6	Tucson	47
3	Sioux Falls	50
5	Nebraska	45
4	Green Bay	40

Semifinals
5	Nebraska	45
1	Arizona	62
3	Sioux Falls	52
2	Iowa	50

2019 United Bowl
3	Sioux Falls	56
1	Arizona	53
