= 2018 Indoor Football League season =

2018 IFL season
- League: Indoor Football League
- Sport: Indoor football
- Duration: February 23, 2018 – June 16, 2018
- Teams: 6
- Finals champions: Iowa Barnstormers
- Runners-up: Sioux Falls Storm

IFL seasons
- ← 2017 2019 →

The 2018 Indoor Football League season was the tenth season of the Indoor Football League (IFL). The league played with six teams, after the suspension of operations of three teams, the departure of another two teams, and the addition and subsequent suspension of two teams.

The top four teams made the IFL playoffs with the semifinals consisting of the top seed hosting the fourth seed and the second hosting the third before the winners met in the 2018 United Bowl.

== Offseason ==
Project Fanchise, the ownership of the Salt Lake Screaming Eagles that joined the IFL in 2017 and also bought the Colorado Crush during the season, announced that they would leave the IFL after one season. For the 2018 season, the Arizona Rattlers, Cedar Rapids Titans, Green Bay Blizzard, Iowa Barnstormers, and Nebraska Danger had all committed to play. However, the Spokane Empire had ceased operations at the close of the 2017 season. The Sioux Falls Storm left the league for Champions Indoor Football on August 30, 2017, with the Wichita Falls Nighthawks to follow soon after. On September 12, 2017, it was announced that the Bloomington Edge and West Michigan Ironmen had joined the IFL for the 2018 season.

The CIF then attempted to sue the IFL, Edge, and Ironmen for leaving the CIF after the two teams had already signed league affiliation agreements with the CIF for 2018. The IFL then threatened to sue the CIF, Storm, and Nighthawks in return despite neither former IFL team signing an affiliation agreement with the IFL for 2018. The CIF then retracted their lawsuit with the IFL but also removed the Storm and Nighthawks from their 2018 schedule. After the IFL meetings in October 2017, the Storm returned to the IFL but the Nighthawks had to suspend operations. While the CIF did drop the lawsuit against the IFL, it filed for an injunction against the Edge and Ironmen teams from participating in the IFL for breaking the terms of their signed affiliation agreements. A temporary injunction from participation was granted on January 31, 2018, with the court ruling determining that both teams had been offered bribes from the owner of the Arizona Rattlers to break their contracts with the CIF. The schedule was revised in February for the six participating teams stating the Edge and Ironmen were to return in 2019.

== Teams ==
Team	Location	Arena	Capacity	Founded	Joined	Head coach
Arizona Rattlers	Phoenix, Arizona	Talking Stick Resort Arena	15,505	1992	2017	Kevin Guy
Cedar Rapids Titans	Cedar Rapids, Iowa	U.S. Cellular Center	6,900	2012	2012	Marvin Jones
Green Bay Blizzard	Green Bay, Wisconsin	Resch Center	8,600	2003	2010	Chris Williams (until March 29); Corey Roberson (interim)
Iowa Barnstormers	Des Moines, Iowa	Wells Fargo Arena	15,181	1995	2015	Dixie Wooten
Nebraska Danger	Grand Island, Nebraska	Eihusen Arena	6,000	2011	2011	Mark Stoute (until May 20); Adam Shackleford/Pig Brown (interim co-coaches)
Sioux Falls Storm	Sioux Falls, South Dakota	Denny Sanford Premier Center	10,678	2000	2009	Kurtiss Riggs

== Standings ==
2018 Indoor Football League
	W	L	PCT	PF	PA	GB	STK
y-Iowa Barnstormers	11	3	.786	648	493	—	W1
x-Arizona Rattlers	11	3	.786	746	567	—	W1
x-Sioux Falls Storm	11	3	.786	724	577	—	W5
x-Nebraska Danger	4	10	.286	525	592	7	L9
Cedar Rapids Titans	3	11	.214	543	733	8	L1
Green Bay Blizzard	2	12	.143	421	645	9	L4

y - clinched regular season title

x - clinched playoff spot

== Playoffs ==
Semifinal
1	Iowa	48
4	Nebraska	17
2	Arizona	68
3	Sioux Falls	69 (OT)

2018 United Bowl
1	Iowa	42
3	Sioux Falls	38

== Season awards ==
Award	Winner	Position	Team
Most Valuable Player	Drew Powell	Quarterback	Iowa Barnstormers
Offensive Player of the Year	Darrell Monroe	Running back	Arizona Rattlers
Defensive Player of the Year	Bryce Enyard	Defensive back	Iowa Barnstormers
Special Teams Player of the Year	B.J. Hill	Kick returner	Green Bay Blizzard
Offensive Rookie of the Year	Jeff Ziemba	Quarterback	Arizona Rattlers
Defensive Rookie of the Year	Ricarlo Bell	Defensive lineman	Cedar Rapids Titans
Coach of the Year	Dixie Wooten	Head coach	Iowa Barnstormers
