= 2018 Sioux Falls Storm season =

Indoor Football League team season

- Owner: Todd Tryon
- General manager: Tyler Pederson
- Head coach: Kurtiss Riggs
- Home stadium: Denny Sanford Premier Center

Results
- Record: 11–3
- League place: 3rd

The 2018 Sioux Falls Storm season is the team's nineteenth season as a professional indoor football franchise and 10th in the Indoor Football League (IFL). They are one of six teams that currently compete in the IFL for the 2018 season. The Storm were members of the United Conference in previous seasons, but due to the lack of teams, there is no conference alignment for the 2018 season .

Led by head coach Kurtiss Riggs, the Storm play their home games at the Denny Sanford Premier Center in Sioux Falls, South Dakota.

== Standings ==
2018 Indoor Football League
	W	L	PCT	PF	PA	GB	STK
y-Iowa Barnstormers	11	3	.786	648	493	—	W1
x-Arizona Rattlers	11	3	.786	746	567	—	W1
x-Sioux Falls Storm	11	3	.786	724	577	—	W5
x-Nebraska Danger	4	10	.286	525	592	7	L9
Cedar Rapids Titans	3	11	.214	543	733	8	L1
Green Bay Blizzard	2	12	.143	421	645	9	L4

y - clinched regular season title

x - clinched playoff spot

== Schedule ==
=== Regular season ===
Key: Win Tie Loss Bye

Week	Day	Date	Kickoff	Opponent	Results		Location	Attendance
Week	Day	Date	Kickoff	Opponent	Score	Record	Location	Attendance
1	Sunday	February 25	3:05pm	at Arizona Rattlers	L 33–39	0–1	Talking Stick Resort Arena	12,477
2	BYE							
3	Monday	March 12	6:05pm	Cedar Rapids Titans	W 70–33	1–1	Denny Sanford Premier Center	
4	Sunday	March 18	3:05pm	at Iowa Barnstormers	W 52–40	2–1	Wells Fargo Arena	
5	Saturday	March 24	7:05pm	at Green Bay Blizzard	W 39–23	3–1	Resch Center	5,356
6	BYE							
7	Saturday	April 7	7:00pm	at Nebraska Danger	W 45–37	4–1	Eihusen Arena	
8	Monday	April 16	7:05pm	Arizona Rattlers	L 40–48	4–2	Denny Sanford Premier Center	
9	Saturday	April 21	7:05pm	Cedar Rapids Titans	W 65–48	5–2	Denny Sanford Premier Center	
10	Friday	April 27	7:00pm	at Nebraska Danger	W 62–48	6–2	Eihusen Arena	
11	Saturday	May 5	7:05pm	Iowa Barnstormers	L 42–49	6–3	Denny Sanford Premier Center	
12	Saturday	May 12	7:05pm	Nebraska Danger	W 40–36	7–3	Denny Sanford Premier Center	
13	Friday	May 18	7:05pm	at Cedar Rapids Titans	W 56–45	8–3	U.S. Cellular Center	
14	BYE							
15	Friday	June 1	7:05pm	at Green Bay Blizzard	W 60–21	9–3	Resch Center	
16	Friday	June 8	7:05pm	Iowa Barnstormers	W 51–49	10–3	Denny Sanford Premier Center	
17	Saturday	June 16	7:05pm	Green Bay Blizzard	W 69–61 OT	11–3	Denny Sanford Premier Center	

=== Postseason ===
Round	Day	Date	Kickoff	Opponent	Score	Location
Semifinal	Saturday	June 23	7:05pm	at Arizona Rattlers	W 69–68 OT	Talking Stick Resort Arena
United Bowl	Saturday	July 7	7:00pm	at Iowa Barnstormers	L 38–42	Wells Fargo Arena
