= National Gridiron League (Australia) =

American football league in Australia

- Current season, competition or edition: 2018/19 NGL season
- Sport: American football
- Founded: April 2014
- Founder: Marcin Soluch
- First season: 2018/19
- Owner: Marcin Soluch
- CEO: Christopher Darlison
- No. of teams: 8
- Country: Australia
- Headquarters: Brisbane, Queensland, Australia.
- Relegation to: none

The National Gridiron League (NGL) was a proposed professional American football league in Australia. The inaugural season was scheduled to begin in October 2018. It was originally to begin in 2016, however it was postponed for two years. The League and its teams went silent in 2017 and was presumed defunct from that date. No game was ever played.

The league was to feature a 14-week regular season, which is scheduled to run from October to late January; each team to play seven games with at least two bye weeks. Following the regular season, four teams would compete in the league's playoffs, culminating in a Grand Final championship game in late January.

== Teams ==
Eight teams were planned to compete in the inaugural NGL season in 2017/18:

Team	City	Stadium	Capacity	Coordinates	Founded (Lineage)
Queensland
Brisbane Outlaws	Brisbane, Queensland	Suncorp Stadium	52,500	27.4698°N 153.0251°E	
Logan Wolverines	Logan City, Queensland	Suncorp Stadium	52,500	27.7750°N 153.0619°E	
Gold Coast Kings	Gold Coast, Queensland	Cbus Super Stadium	27,400	28.0167°N 153.4000°E	
North Coast Heat	Sunshine Coast, Queensland			26.6500°N 153.0667°E	
New South Wales
Sydney Express	Sydney, New South Wales			33°51′54″S 151°12′34″E	
Newcastle Miners	Newcastle, New South Wales	Hunter Stadium	33,000	32°55′S 151°45′E	
Wollongong Devils	Wollongong, New South Wales	WIN Stadium	23,000	34°25′59″S 150°52′59″E	
Central Coast Cyclones	Central Coast, New South Wales	Central Coast Stadium	20,059	33.3208°N 151.2336°E	

== Regular season ==
The regular season is 14 weeks long, with games scheduled on October and finishing by February following year. The NGL's eight teams are divided into two states, four in New South Wales and four in Queensland. Each team plays two games against each other. The four best teams from the regular season will pass to the playoffs to play the semi-finals. The winners from the semi-finals will be classified to the Grand Final.
