= Iowa Barnstormers =

Arena football team

- Current season
- Logo
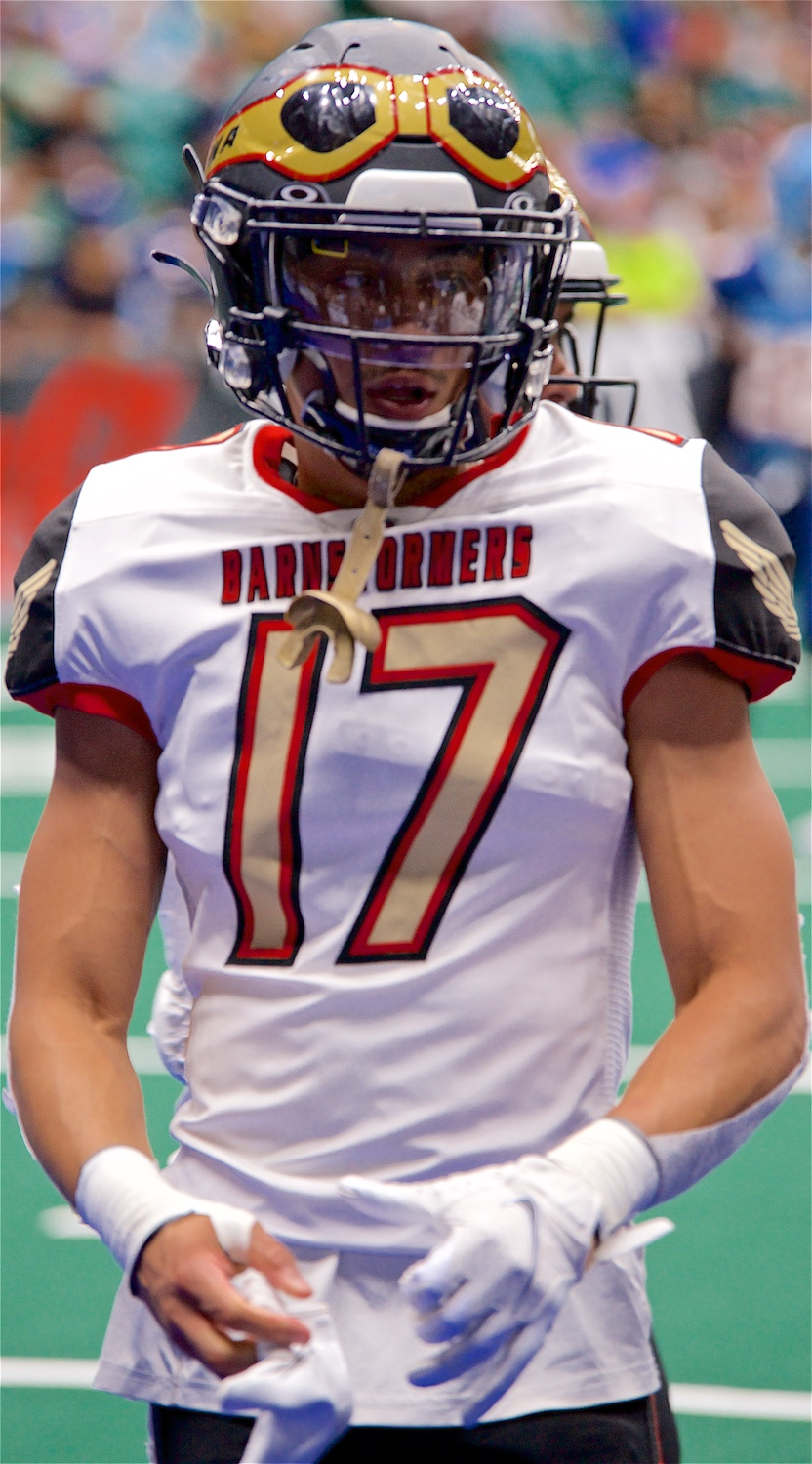
- Uniforms

General information
- Founded: 1995
- Headquartered: Casey's Center in Des Moines, Iowa
- Colors: Black, gold, red, white, grey
- Website: theiowabarnstormers.com
- TheIowaBarnstormers.com

Personnel
- Owner: Jeff Lamberti
- General manager: Juli Pettit
- Head coach: Andre Coles

Team history
- First franchise; Iowa Barnstormers (1995–2000); New York Dragons (2001–2008); Second franchise; Iowa Barnstormers (2001, 2008–present)

Home fields
- Veterans Memorial Auditorium (1995–2001); Casey's Center (2008–present)

League / conference affiliations
- Arena Football League (1995–2000): American Conference (1995–2000); Central Division (1995–2000); AF2 (2001, 2008–2009): American Conference (2001, 2008–2009); Midwest Division (2001, 2008–2009); Arena Football League (2010–2014): National Conference (2010–2013); Central Division (2010–2013); American Conference (2014); East Division (2014); Indoor Football League (2015–present): United Conference (2015–2017); Eastern Conference (2022–present)

Championships
- League championships: 1: 2018
- Conference championships: 2: 1996, 1997
- Division championships: 5: 1996, 1997, 1999, 2000, 2009

Playoff appearances (10)
- 1995, 1996, 1997, 1999, 2000, 2009, 2017, 2018, 2019, 2021, 2022

The Iowa Barnstormers are a professional indoor football team based in Des Moines, Iowa, that competes in the Indoor Football League (IFL). They play their home games at Casey's Center.

Several teams called the Iowa Barnstormers have played in different indoor football leagues since 1995. The original Arena Football League team played in Des Moines' Veterans Memorial Auditorium from 1995 to 2001, and subsequently relocated to Uniondale, New York, where they were known as the New York Dragons. Des Moines was awarded a franchise in the developmental AF2 league in 2001 that carried on the Barnstormers name and branding, but the team suspended operations after the end of the season. In 2008 a new Barnstormers team began play in the AF2, now based in the new Wells Fargo Arena; this team joined the new AFL in 2010 following the league's reorganization. For the 2015 season, the Barnstormers left the AFL and became members of the IFL.

== History ==
=== Original Barnstormers: 1995–2000 ===
On April 25, 1994, the Arena Football League approved an expansion team to be based in Des Moines, Iowa, to begin play in the 1995 season. The team was owned by Jim Foster, the inventor/creator of arena football, and the founder of the Arena Football League. On May 12, 1995, the Barnstormers played their first regular season game, on the road against the Milwaukee Mustangs. In a wild finish that saw both teams combine to score 24 points in the final 40.4 seconds of the fourth quarter, the Barnstormers won, 69–61. The next weekend, May 20, 1995, the Barnstormers played their first regular season home game against the Miami Hooters at Veterans Memorial Auditorium, winning 41–29.

Behind the strength of AFL Coach of the Year John Gregory, the Barnstormers raced to a 3–0 start and secured the 5th seed for the playoffs. After upsetting defending ArenaBowl champion Arizona, 56–52, in their first playoff game, the Barnstormers fell, 56–49, to 6th-seeded Orlando in the semifinals.

After an 0–1 start to their second season, the Barnstormers won their first Central Division title on the strength of eight consecutive wins to close the season. After edging St. Louis and Albany in the first two rounds of the playoffs, the top-seeded Barnstormers lost a 42–38 heartbreaker at home to second-seeded Tampa Bay in ArenaBowl X.

In 1997, the Barnstormers repeated as Central Division champions with an 11–3 record, including a 61–38 road thrashing of the rival Storm to avenge the previous season's ArenaBowl defeat. With the 2nd seed in the playoffs, the Barnstormers avenged a regular season defeat against 7th-seeded San Jose, 68–59, before racing past 4th-seeded Orlando 52–34 to reach the franchise's second ArenaBowl in three seasons. However, in ArenaBowl XI, Arizona used a 42–13 scoring stretch over the 2nd and 3rd Quarters to roll past Iowa, 55–33.

Star offensive specialist Willis Jacox retired after the 1997 season, while star quarterback Kurt Warner signed with the St. Louis Rams of the National Football League (NFL). Forced to rebuild after losing the eventual two-time NFL MVP, the Barnstormers limped to an 0–5 start in 1998. After acquiring Aaron Garcia from New Jersey, the Barnstormers improved, with a three-game winning streak sparked by Garcia and rookie sensation Kevin Swayne, putting the Barnstormers in playoff contention late in the year. But, in the end, they faltered, finishing 5–9, their worst season of their years in Iowa.

In 1999, the Barnstormer resurgence under Garcia continued, with Iowa winning nine of their last ten regular season games (following a 2–2 start) to capture their third Central Division title in four seasons and secure the 2nd seed in the playoffs. A thrashing of division rival Milwaukee in the quarterfinals paired with 8th-seeded Orlando's 41–19 shocker at Tampa Bay set Iowa up at home against the 6th-seeded Predators with a chance to advance to another home ArenaBowl. However, Orlando continued its shocking run to ArenaBowl XIII with a 56–49 upset of the Barnstormers.

The 2000 Barnstormers put up startling offensive numbers, as Garcia threw for 92 touchdowns against just 8 interceptions, with 46 of the touchdowns going to Mike Horacek. Despite this prolific offense, Iowa started slowly, losing three of their first four games. However, a five-game winning streak return the Barnstormers to the thick of the playoff hunt. Iowa went on to win their fourth Central Division crown in six seasons of play, earning the 3rd seed in the newly expanded playoffs. However, Iowa's playoff run came to a quick end on a Sunday afternoon in the quarterfinals, as the 6th-seeded Nashville scored the final 14 points to defeat Iowa, 49–42. Historically, the Barnstormers have ranked high in home paid attendance. In the Arena Football League, they finished 7th in 1995, 8th in 1996, 9th in 1997, 8th in 1998, 9th in 1999, and 9th in 2000.

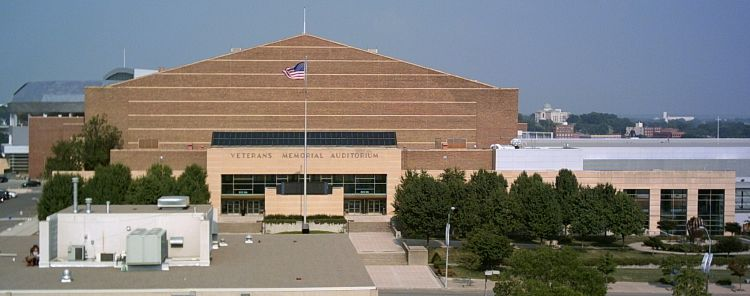
Veterans Memorial Auditorium, where the Barnstormers played from 1995 to 2001.

=== AF2 years: 2001, 2008–2009 ===
The need for a more modern venue as well as the league's desire for a larger market led to the move to New York City despite two failed past attempts in the city, the New York Knights (1988) and the New York CityHawks (1997–1998), both of which played at Madison Square Garden in Manhattan. The team was purchased by Charles Wang, who is also the Islanders' majority owner, and renamed the New York Dragons.

Aside from the league's desire to re-enter the New York market, another major reason cited for the team's relocation was the inadequacy of their Des Moines venue, the Iowa Veterans Memorial Auditorium, also known as "The Barn". Most of the seats in this venue were located directly along the sidelines as is typical of high school sports venues. The Barnstormers organization constantly lobbied for the construction of a better facility during their time in Des Moines to no avail.

The arena Football organization awarded an AF2 franchise to Iowa for the 2001 season, which continued the Barnstormer name. However, low attendance (less than half of the average of the AFL franchise) and a relatively poor season (a five-game winning streak to close the season wasn't able to turn a 4–7 start into a playoff berth) would lead to that franchise suspending operations following their first season.

On September 20, 2007, the AF2 announced that they had approved the inactive franchise's new ownership, meaning that the Barnstormers resumed play in 2008 at the Wells Fargo Arena. They held practices at the historic Veterans Memorial Auditorium, and they inherited the tradition of the original Barnstormers. The team adopted the original unique uniforms, which in keeping with the aviation theme included the depiction of goggles on the helmets, wings on the shoulders of the jerseys, and propellers on the pants legs. The mascot, a dog named Ace, is featured in this helmet, along with the uniform jersey and pants.

After being on hiatus for six seasons, the Barnstormers played their first regular season game of 2008, falling at the Louisville Fire 58–28 on March 29, 2008. The following week, they would return home for a Monday Night primetime match-up with the Lexington Horsemen on April 14, 2008. In the debut of Arena Football at the Wells Fargo Arena, the Barnstormers lost a close 43–41 contest. The next week, Iowa won their first regular season match-up since 2001 (their 75th overall), defeating the Quad City Steamwheelers 58–38 on April 19 in Moline, Illinois. The team would win their first home game at the Wells Fargo Arena on April 26, 2008, defeating the Stockton Lightning 47–24. During the 2008 season, the Barnstormers ranked 17th in average home paid attendance out of the 46 combined teams in the Arena Football League and AF2. In both 2008 and 2009, Iowa ranked second in AF2 attendance to the Spokane Shock, with attendances of 9,341 and 9,520, respectively.

=== Return to the AFL (2010–2014) ===
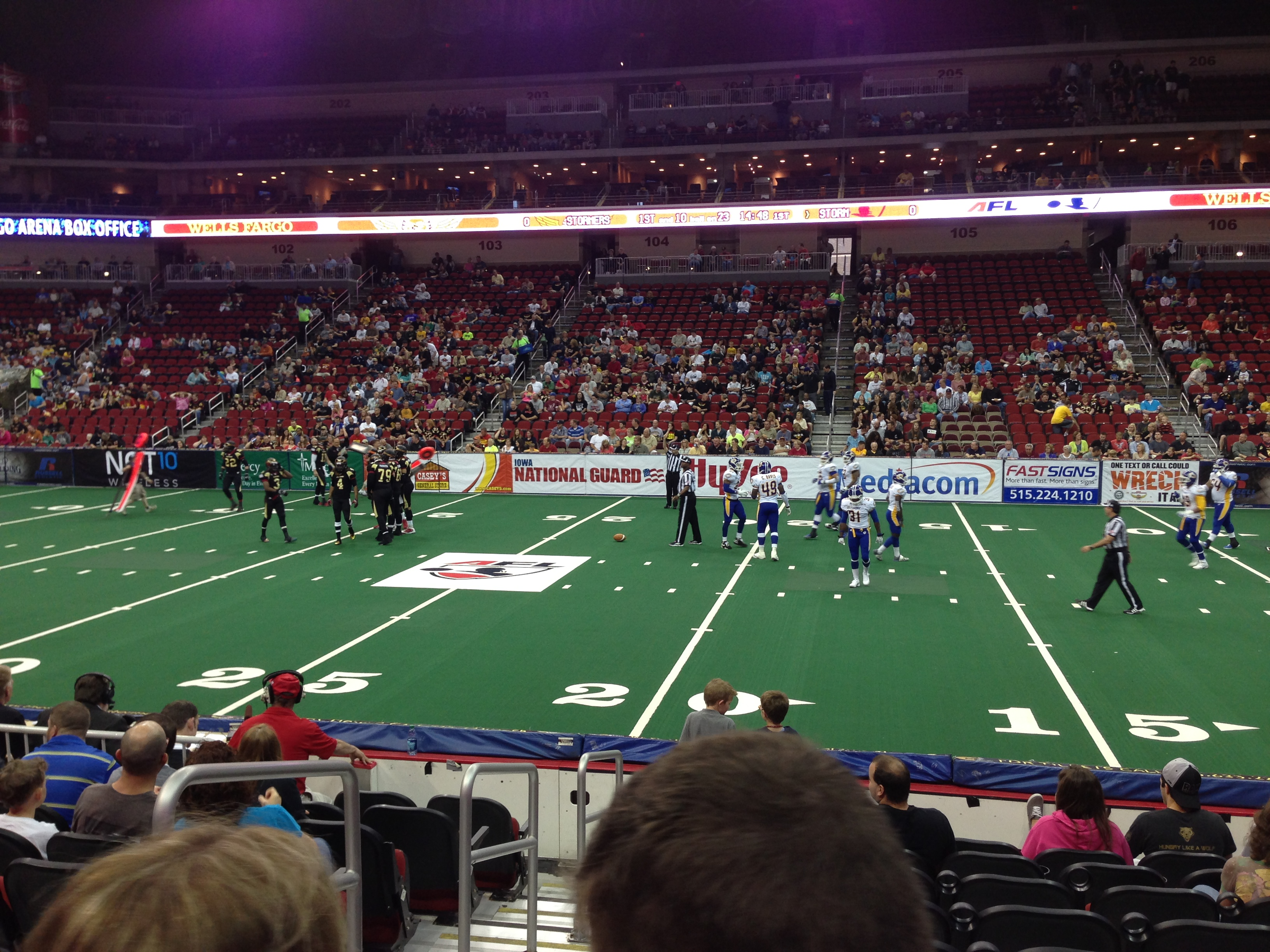
The Barnstormers playing against the Tampa Bay Storm during the 2013 season.

On September 28, 2009, the Barnstormers announced their status as a charter member of the new Arena Football League, marking their return to playing top-notch arena football after almost a decade of lower levels and inactivity. A franchise-record 12,184 fans attended the 2010 opener; however, Iowa's first play from scrimmage resulted in an interception return for a touchdown by the Chicago Rush, an ominous harbinger of an eventual 7–9 season.

=== Indoor Football League (2015–present) ===
On July 27, 2014, Barnstormers president Jeff Lamberti told WHO-TV in Des Moines that the franchise will explore "all options" in the off-season of their continuance to play, including leaving the AFL and going to the Indoor Football League for 2015. The Barnstormers had not had a winning season since their revival as a top-level arena football team, mainly because of the difficulty in attracting top-ticket free agents to the AFL's smallest market.

On August 27, 2014, Lamberti announced that the Iowa Barnstormers had officially become members of the IFL and named former Barnstormers quarterback Joe Brannen to replace Mike Hohensee. The Barnstormers became the first team to directly leave the AFL for a new league, although previously the Austin Wranglers had been demoted from the AFL to the AFL's former minor league, af2. The Arkansas Twisters, Tri-Cities Fever, and Green Bay Blizzard were former af2 teams which jumped to the IFL.

"We are excited to bring the Barnstormers to the IFL", said Lamberti. "The chance to sign more local players, see more fans at road games, and create friendly rivalries with other teams of the Midwest are just a few of the opportunities that we look forward to."

AFL commissioner Jerry Kurz released a statement regarding the Barnstormers departure from the AFL: "We wish the Iowa Barnstormers all the best in their new endeavor. Their organization has been a part of the rich history of Arena Football for years now and will always be thought of fondly by those who love our sport." It was also noted that players currently under contract with the team were not obligated to remain with the club, essentially making them free agents.

IFL commissioner Mike Allshouse commented: "This is a monumental day in the history of the Indoor Football League. These are exciting times for the IFL as we continue to improve and expand our business model."

To adjust to their new league, the Barnstormers removed the word "arena" from their logo as they are no longer with the Arena Football League, yet will retain the history of their time with the AFL. They did use the rebound nets they owned from their AFL days in 2015, but under IFL rules, any ball that hits the netting is a dead ball. The rebound nets were taken down in 2016 and replaced by the standard indoor football goalposts with netting surrounding each end zone.

On July 11, 2016, Brannen was fired as the Barnstormers head coach. On August 24, 2016, Brannen was replaced by Dixie Wooten. Wooten had been serving as the offensive coordinator for the Cedar Rapids Titans. In his second year as head coach, Wooten led the Barnstormers to their first championship on July 7, 2018, over the Sioux Falls Storm 42–38 in the United Bowl. Wooten led the team to a 12–2 record in 2019, but again lost to Sioux Falls in the semifinals. After the season, he was hired away by the 2019 expansion team Tucson Sugar Skulls. Wooten was replaced by Ameer Ismail, the former head coach of the Massachusetts Pirates. However, he would not coach a game for the team as the 2020 season was cancelled due to the COVID-19 pandemic.

Longtime general manager John Pettit died in December 2020 after complications from COVID-19 and his daughter Juli was named the team's new general manager. The Barnstormers hired former Jacksonville Sharks head coach Les Moss for the 2021 season. Moss then brought former Albany Empire head coach Rob Keefe to Iowa after serving as Keefe's assistant in Albany. The Barnstormers finished 6–6 and were eliminated in the first round of the playoffs. Moss was released in September 2021.

The Barnstormers then hired former Albany Empire assistant general manager Dave Mogensen as its head coach for the 2022 season. The team made the playoffs yet again under his leadership. The 2023 season will be remembered as one of the worst in franchise history. The team only won four games and struggled on offense.

== Logos and uniforms ==
When the Barnstormers began playing in 1995, the team's logo consisted of a circular logo, which depicted a barnstorming airplane over the city of Des Moines. The logo was surrounded by a circular script reading, "Arena Football Club". The word "Arena" was removed when the team moved to the IFL. The circle logo also has wings on each side, with the words "Iowa" and "Barnstormers" on two lines above the circle logo. Below the logo was the words, "Des Moines." The team's colors consisted of black, gold and cardinal. The three colors are a combination of the Iowa Hawkeyes black and gold, and the Iowa State Cyclones cardinal and gold.

=== Uniforms ===
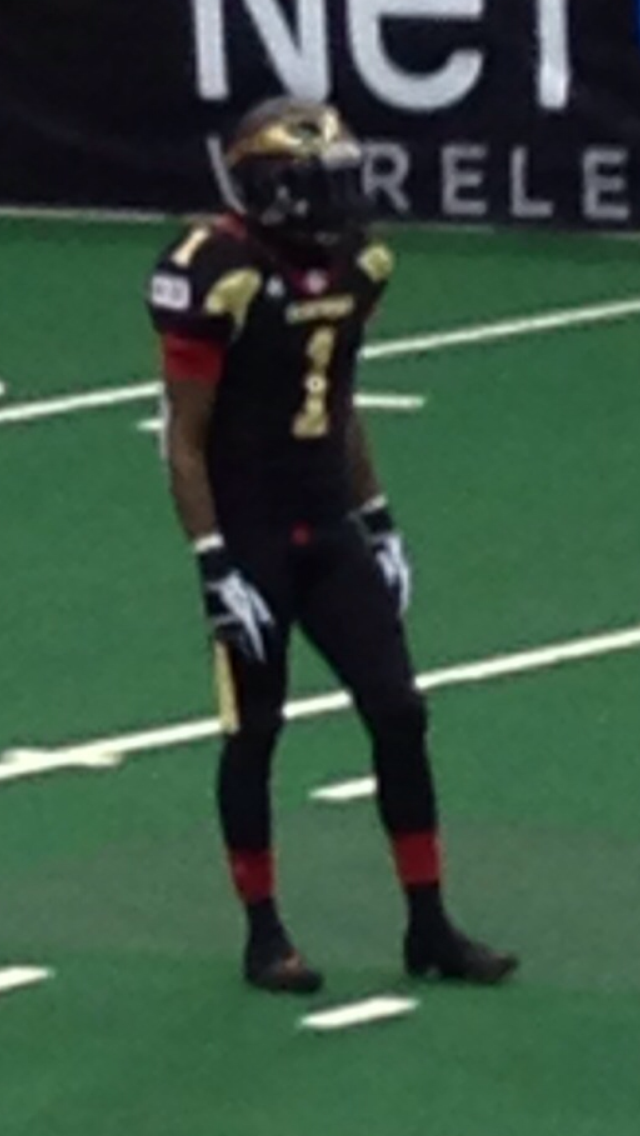
Erick McIntosh wearing the Barnstormers' 2013 all black home uniform.

The goggles on the team's helmet make the Barnstormers helmet one of the most recognized helmets in AFL history. In a 2008 Yahoo! article, the Barnstormers' helmet was ranked as the 8th best helmet in pro football history. Until 2012, the helmet was gold with black goggles; this was reversed beginning in the 2013 season.

The Barnstormers' original uniform designed consisted of a gold helmet, and either black or white jerseys with gold numbers on the black jerseys and black numbers on the white jersey with pilots' wings on the front of both. Gold pants were used with both jerseys. A side stripe on the pants was in the design of a propeller blade. Upon the club's return through until 2023, the wings were removed from the jersey. Beginning in 2013, the team switched to black pants.

In 2024, the Barnstormers returned to their original jerseys from the Kurt Warner days.

== Notable players ==
=== Retired uniform numbers ===
Iowa Barnstormers retired numbers
No.	Player	Position	Seasons	Ref.
13	Kurt Warner	QB	1995–1997	

=== Arena Football League Hall of Famers ===
Iowa Barnstormers Hall of Famers
No.	Name	Year Inducted	Position(s)	Years w/ Barnstormers
--	Jim Foster	1998	Owner	1995–2001
--	Jon Roehlk	1999	OL/DL	1995–1996
--	Mike Hohensee	2012	Head coach/Coach	2012-2014
13	Kurt Warner	2002	QB	1995–1997

=== Indoor Football League Hall of Famers ===
Iowa Barnstormers Hall of Famers
No.	Name	Year Inducted	Position(s)	Years w/ Barnstormers
23	Javicz Jones	2019	LB	2015–2017
4	Bryan Pray	2019	WR	2017
--	John Pettit	2021	GM/VP	2008–2020

=== All-Arena players ===
The following Barnstormers players have been named to All-Arena Teams:

- QB Kurt Warner (2), Aaron Garcia
- WR/DB Carlos James (3)
- WR Jesse Schmidt (2), Marco Thomas, Darius Reynolds
- OS Lamart Cooper, Mike Horacek
- DL Mike Lewis (2)
- DB Tanner Varner, Jason Simpson
- DS Shea Showers, Kevin Kaesviharn
- K Mike Black, Clay Rush

=== All-IFL players ===
The following Barnstormers players have been named to All-IFL Teams:

- QB Travis Partridge, Drew Powell, Daquan Neal
- WR Brady Roland (4), Bryan Pray, Ryan Balentine
- OL D'Angelo McCray, Brandon Haskin, Demarious Loving,
- DL Ra'Shawde Myers
- LB Javicz Jones (2), Zachary Allen, Treyvon Williams
- DB Jamie Bender, Bryce Enyard, Jourdan Wickliffe, Tyrell Pearson

=== Individual awards ===
Offensive Player of the Year
Season	Player	Position
2000	Mike Horacek	OS

Wide Receiver of the Year
Season	Player	Position
2014	Marco Thomas	WR

Adam Pringle Award
Season	Player	Position
2016	Peter Evans	OL

Defensive Player of the Year
Season	Player	Position
2017	Javicz Jones	LB
2018	Bryce Enyard	DB

Most Improved Player
Season	Player	Position
2017	Travis Partridge	QB

Most Valuable Player
Season	Player	Position
2018	Drew Powell	QB
2019	Daquan Neal	QB

Coach of the Year
Season	Player	Position
2018	Dixie Wooten	HC

== Statistics and records ==
=== Season-by-season records ===
ArenaBowl/United Bowl	ArenaBowl appearance	Division champions	Playoff berth

Season	League	Conference	Division	Regular season			Postseason results
Season	League	Conference	Division	Finish	Wins	Losses	Postseason results
Iowa Barnstormers
1995	AFL	American	Central	2nd	7	5	Won Quarterfinals (Arizona) 56–52; Lost Semifinals (Orlando) 56–49
1996	AFL	American	Central	1st	12	2	Won Quarterfinals (St. Louis) 52–49; Won Semifinals (Albany) 62–55; Lost ArenaBowl X (Tampa Bay) 42–38
1997	AFL	American	Central	1st	11	3	Won Quarterfinals (San Jose) 68–59; Won Semifinals (Orlando) 52–34; Lost ArenaBowl XI (Arizona) 55–33
1998	AFL	American	Central	3rd	5	9	
1999	AFL	American	Central	1st	11	3	Won Quarterfinals (Milwaukee) 66–34; Lost Semifinals (Orlando) 48–41
2000	AFL	American	Central	1st	9	5	Lost Quarterfinals (Nashville) 63–56
2001	AF2	American	Midwest	3rd	9	7	
2002	Did not play						
2003	Did not play						
2004	Did not play						
2005	Did not play						
2006	Did not play						
2007	Did not play						
2008	AF2	American	Midwest	5th	6	10	
2009	AF2	American	Midwest	1st	12	4	Won Conference Quarterfinals (Manchester) 70–53; Lost Conference Semifinals (Green Bay) 51–46
2010	AFL	National	Midwest	4th	7	9	
2011	AFL	National	Central	5th	5	13	
2012	AFL	National	Central	2nd	7	11	
2013	AFL	National	Central	3rd	6	12	
2014	AFL	American	East	4th	6	12	
2015	IFL	United		5th	6	8	
2016	IFL	United		5th	4	12	
2017	IFL	United		2nd	13	3	Lost Conference Semifinals (Sioux Falls) 45–24
2018	IFL			1st	11	3	Won Semifinal (Nebraska) 48–17; Won United Bowl (Sioux Falls) 42–38
2019	IFL			2nd	12	2	Lost Semifinal (Sioux Falls) 52–50
2020	IFL			Season cancelled due to COVID-19 pandemic			
2021	IFL			5th	6	6	Lost First round (Duke City) 33–34
2022	IFL	Eastern		4th	9	7	Lost First round (Frisco) 39–64
2023	IFL	Eastern		6th	3	13	
2024	IFL	Eastern		7th	5	11	
2025	IFL	Eastern		7th	1	15	
2026	IFL	Eastern		7th	1	15	
Total					184	200	(includes only regular season)
Total					9	10	(includes only the postseason)
Total					193	210	(includes both regular season and postseason)

=== Head coaching records ===
Note: Statistics are correct through the end of the 2025 Indoor Football League season.

Name	Term	Regular season				Playoffs		Achievements
Name	Term	W	L	T	Win%	W	L	Achievements
John Gregory	1995–2000; 2008–2011	82	57	0	.590	7	6	
Art Haege	2001	2	4	0	.333	—	—	
Earle Bruce	2001	7	3	0	.700	0	0	
J. T. Smith	2011	3	6	0	.200	0	0	
Mike Hohensee	2012–2014	19	35	0	.352	0	0	
Joe Brannen	2015–2016	10	20	0	.333	0	0	
Dixie Wooten	2017–2019	36	8	0	.818	2	1	Coach of the Year (2017)
Les Moss	2021	6	6	0	.500	0	1	
Dave Mogensen	2022–2025	18	45	0	.286	0	1	
Andre Coles	2026–	0	0	0	–	0	0	
