= Casey's Center =

Multi-purpose arena in Des Moines, Iowa, United States

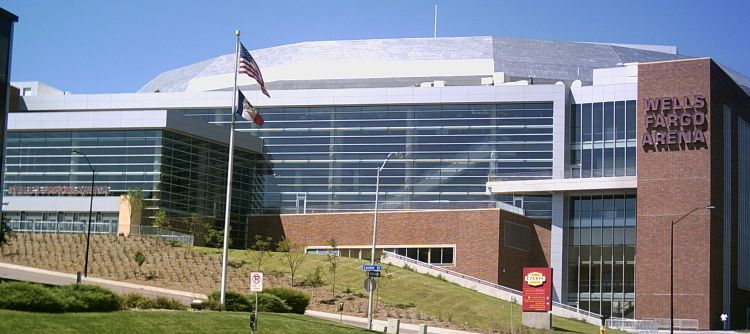
- Casey's Center (as Wells Fargo Arena) In August 2005
- Interactive map of Casey's Center
- Former names: Wells Fargo Arena (2005–June 2025)
- Address: 233 Center Street
- Location: Des Moines, Iowa, United States
- Coordinates: 41°35′33.6″N 93°37′16.1″W
- Owner: Polk County
- Operator: Spectra Venue Management
- Capacity: 16,980 (center stage concerts); 16,285 (end stage concerts); 16,110 (basketball); 15,181 (hockey); 15,181 (football)
- Surface: Multi-surface

Construction
- Groundbreaking: December 18, 2002
- Opened: July 12, 2005
- Renovated: 2008
- Expanded: April 2011
- Cost: $117 million ($193 million in 2025 dollars)
- Architects: HOK Sport; Renaissance Design Group; Brooks Borg Skiles
- Structural engineer: Thornton Tomasetti
- Services engineers: FSC, Inc.
- General contractor: Weitz/Turner

Tenants
- Iowa Stars/Chops (AHL) (2005–2009); Iowa Barnstormers (IFL) (2008–present); Iowa Wild (AHL) (2013–present); Iowa Wolves (NBAGL) (2017–present)

Website
- iowaeventscenter.com

The Casey's Center is a multi-purpose arena in downtown Des Moines, Iowa, United States. Part of the Iowa Events Center, the arena opened on July 12, 2005, at a cost of $117 million. Named for title sponsor Casey’s, the arena replaced the aging Community Choice Credit Union Convention Center as the Des Moines area's primary venue for sporting events and concerts.

The Casey's Center seats 15,181 people for hockey and arena football games, 16,110 for basketball games, and as many as 16,980 for concerts. It also features The Fort Restaurant, which provides views of the Des Moines River and the Iowa State Capitol. The restaurant opened on October 6, 2005, coinciding with the Iowa Stars' inaugural home game.

The arena is also connected to the rest of the Iowa Events Center as well as downtown Des Moines through the city's Skywalk system.

The Casey's Center was named Wells Fargo Arena from opening until June 2025 for Wells Fargo.

== Usage ==
Former logo as Wells Fargo Arena.

The first event held at the arena was Tony Hawk's Boom-Boom Huck Jam, on July 14, 2005. Its first concert, featuring Tom Petty and the Heartbreakers with The Black Crowes, was held on July 18.

Wells Fargo Arena is home to the Iowa Wolves (formerly named the Iowa Energy) of the NBA G League, the Iowa Barnstormers of the Indoor Football League and the Iowa Wild of the American Hockey League.

From 2005 until 2009, Wells Fargo Arena served as the home of the American Hockey League's Iowa Chops. The arena is notable for hosting the inaugural game of the reincarnation of the Arena Football League on April 2, 2010, between the Barnstormers and Chicago Rush, televised nationally by NFL Network.

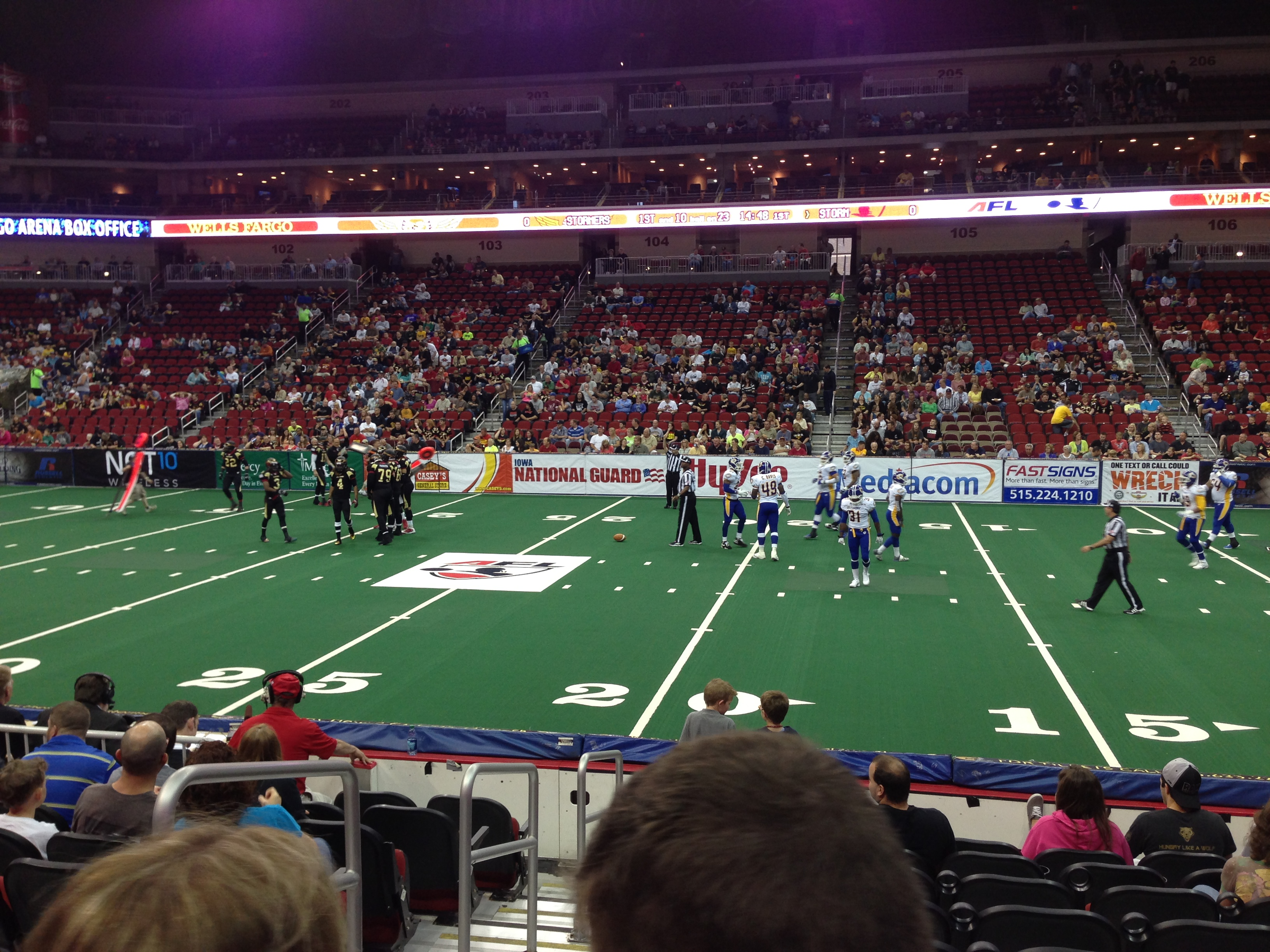
The Iowa Barnstormers playing against the Tampa Bay Storm during the 2013 season.

It was the host for the first and second Round games for the 2008 NCAA Division I women's basketball tournament and served as a regional site 2012 tournament. In 2013, it hosted the NCAA Wrestling Team Championship.

It has hosted the state high school boys' wrestling individual championships and basketball tournaments since 2006 with the boys basketball tournament moving to Hilton Coliseum in Ames in 2027 and the Big Four Classic, a doubleheader featuring the state's four men's Division I teams, from 2012 to 2018. The arena has also played host to the Iowa Girls State Basketball and Dance Championships since its opening.

The arena hosted the 2011 NBA D-League Finals, which saw the Iowa Energy win their first title on their home court and set the D-League attendance record with 14,036 fans in the arena for Game 2.

In 2016, the arena hosted first and second-round games for the Men's NCAA basketball tournament after having failed on several prior bids. The NCAA Men's basketball tournament returned to Wells Fargo Arena in 2019, hosting the tournament's first and second round from March 21 to 23. The tournament returned yet again in 2023, hosting national powers Kansas and Texas. The tournament is slated to return in 2028.

In 2020, the arena gained a temporary second hockey tenant when the Des Moines Buccaneers announced plans to begin their season downtown after damage to their home arena during the August 2020 Midwest derecho. The Buccaneers returned to their previous arena in January 2021.

The arena hosted Des Moines' first UFC event on May 3, 2025 for UFC on ESPN: Sandhagen vs. Figueiredo, marking the promotion's first event in Iowa since 2000.

== Tenants ==
=== Current tenants ===
- Iowa Wild of the AHL, affiliate of the NHL's Minnesota Wild
- Iowa Wolves of the NBA G League, affiliate of the NBA's Minnesota Timberwolves
- Iowa Barnstormers of the IFL

=== Former tenants ===
- Iowa Stars of the AHL; the team operated from 2005 to 2008 as the Iowa Stars (affiliate of the NHL's Dallas Stars) and in 2008–09 as the Iowa Chops (affiliate of the NHL's Anaheim Ducks).

== Events ==
- Slipknot: from Des Moines, 2009 and 2016; played their song "Iowa"
- Tony Hawk's Boom Boom Huck Jam: 2005
- Paul McCartney: 2005, 2017, 2025
- Garth Brooks: six sold-out shows (April - May, 2016)
- The Des Moines Register Sports Awards, held annually from 2017 to 2019
- NCAA Wrestling National Championship: 2013
- Green Day: 2005, 2017
- WWE Raw and Smackdown Live!
- The Eagles: 2018
- Coldplay: June, 2009
- Tom Petty and the Heartbreakers: 2016
- Jimmy Buffett: April, 2012
- Foo Fighters: November, 2017
- Drake: 2016
- NCAA Men's Basketball First and Second Rounds: 2016, 2019, 2023, 2028
- The Chainsmokers: 2017
- Red Hot Chili Peppers: 2007 and 2017
- Boston: 2016
- Panic! At The Disco: 2017
- Eric Church: 2018
- Chris Stapleton: 2017
- Hall & Oates: 2017
- NCAA Women's Volleyball Championships: 2016
- Justin Moore and Lee Brice: 2017
- Journey and Def Leppard: 2018
- Fall Out Boy: 2016, 2018, 2024
- Shania Twain: 2015 and 2018
- Shawn Mendes: 2019
- Tool: 2019
- Cage the Elephant: 2024
- Twenty One Pilots: 2019
- Taylor Swift: 2009, 2011, 2013 and 2015
- Cardi B: 2019
- For King & Country: 2021
- Justin Bieber: 2010, 2013, 2016 and 2022
- Britney Spears: 2009 (The Circus Starring Britney Spears)
- AJR: 2021 and 2024
- Elton John: Farewell Tour 2022
- Lorde: 2018
- AEW Dynamite and Rampage: 2024

Events and tenants
Preceded by Toyota Center (Houston)	Home of the Iowa Wild; 2013 – present	Succeeded by current
