= 2016 United Bowl =

Spokane Empire	Sioux Falls Storm
(12–4)	(15–1)
Intense	United
34	55
Head coach: Adam Shackleford	Head coach: Kurtiss Riggs
	1	2	3	4	Total
Spokane	7	6	7	14	34
Sioux Falls	0	20	14	21	55
- Date: July 23, 2016
- Stadium: Denny Sanford Premier Center
- Location: Sioux Falls, South Dakota, U.S.
- MVP: Sioux Falls QB Lorenzo Brown
- Attendance: 9,000

The 2016 United Bowl was the championship game of the 2016 Indoor Football League season. It was played between the Intense Conference Champion Spokane Empire and the United Conference Champion Sioux Falls Storm. The game was played at Denny Sanford Premier Center in Sioux Falls, South Dakota.

The Sioux Falls Storm beat the Spokane Empire, 55–34. This was the Storm's sixth United Bowl championship and seventh overall United Bowl appearance. It was the Spokane Empire's first United Bowl appearance.

== Venue ==
The game was played at Denny Sanford Premier Center in Sioux Falls, South Dakota, as the Sioux Falls Storm had the home field advantage by cause of having a better regular season record.

== Background ==
=== Spokane Empire ===
On September 1, 2015, the Spokane Shock left the Arena Football League for the IFL. They changed their names to the Empire, as the AFL owned the rights to the Shock name. The Empire finished the season with a conference best 12–4, earning the first seed in the Intense Conference and a first round bye. In the conference championship, they defeated the Nebraska Danger at home in a 55–44 contest.

2016 Intense Conference
	W	L	T	PCT	PF	PA	GB	STK
y-Spokane Empire	12	4	0	.750	815	709	--	L2
x-Billings Wolves	8	8	0	.500	643	647	4.0	W2
x-Nebraska Danger	6	10	0	.375	765	794	6.0	W1
Colorado Crush	4	12	0	.250	849	914	8.0	W2
Tri-Cities Fever	3	13	0	.188	577	758	9.0	L9

=== Sioux Falls Storm ===
In 2016, the Storm began the regular season with four straight wins before their first road-bump in a loss to the Cedar Rapids Titans. They rebounded from that loss with eleven consecutive victories to finish the season with a 15–1 record, and first place in the United Conference. Sioux Falls clinched home field advantage and a first round bye due to their conference finish. In the conference championship, they defeated the Cedar Rapids Titans at home by a score of 54–28.

2016 United Conference
	W	L	T	PCT	PF	PA	GB	STK
y–Sioux Falls Storm	15	1	0	.938	951	720	--	W11
x–Cedar Rapids Titans	12	4	0	.750	781	628	3.0	W7
x–Wichita Falls Nighthawks	11	5	0	.688	1001	861	4.0	W2
Green Bay Blizzard	5	11	0	.313	682	932	10.0	L1
Iowa Barnstormers	4	12	0	.250	737	838	11.0	L7

== Box score ==
Quarter	1	2	3	4	Total
Empire	7	6	7	14	34
Storm	0	20	14	21	55

at Denny Sanford Premier Center, Sioux Falls, South Dakota

- Date: July 23, 2016
- Game time: 8:05 p.m. EDT
- Game attendance: 9,000

Scoring summary

Quarter	Time	Drive			Team	Scoring information	Score	
Quarter	Time	Plays	Yards	TOP	Team	Scoring information	SPO	SFX
1	9:34	8	37	5:26	SPO	Hayes 9-yard touchdown reception from Dowdell, Clarke kick good	7	0
2	11:55	6	30	3:05	SFX	Brown 1-yard touchdown run, Syrovatka kick good	7	7
2	8:33	5	38	3:15	SPO	Charles 24-yard touchdown reception from Dowdell, Clarke kick no good	13	7
2	7:57	1	23	0:29	SFX	Tatum 23-yard touchdown reception from Brown, Syrovatka kick no good	13	13
2	0:03	8	45	2:44	SFX	Williams 11-yard touchdown reception from Brown, Syrovatka kick good	13	20
3	14:30	1	49	0:29	SFX	Tatum 49-yard touchdown reception from Brown, Syrovatka kick good	13	27
3	13:58	1	31	0:25	SPO	Charles 31-yard touchdown reception from Dowdell, Clarke kick good	20	27
3	8:57	9	45	5:01	SFX	Brown 1-yard touchdown run, Syrovatka kick good	20	34
4	9:02	5	35	3:06	SFX	Brown 4-yard touchdown run, Syrovatka kick good	20	41
4	5:42	4	17	3:14	SPO	Dowdell 1-yard touchdown run, Clarke kick no good	26	41
4	3:24	3	21	2:09	SFX	Holley 20-yard touchdown reception from Brown, Syrovatka kick good	26	48
4	2:55	1	24	0:25	SPO	Pierce 24-yard touchdown reception from Dowdell, 2-point pass good (Dowdell–Samuel pass)	34	48
4	1:22	4	17	1:43	SFX	Williams 2-yard touchdown run, Syrovatka kick good	34	55
"TOP" = time of possession. For other American football terms, see Glossary of American football.							34	55
