= 2016 Sioux Falls Storm season =

Indoor Football League team season

- Owner: Todd Tryon
- General manager: Tyler Pederson
- Head coach: Kurtiss Riggs
- Home stadium: Denny Sanford Premier Center

Results
- Record: 15-1
- Conference place: 1st
- Playoffs: Won United Conference Championship 54-28 (Titans); Won 2016 United Bowl 55-34 (Empire)

The 2016 Sioux Falls Storm season was the team's seventeenth season as a professional indoor football franchise and eighth in the Indoor Football League (IFL). One of ten teams that competed in the IFL for the 2016 season, the Storm were members of the United Conference.

Led by head coach Kurtiss Riggs, the Storm played their home games at the Denny Sanford Premier Center in Sioux Falls, South Dakota.

== Schedule ==
Key: Win Tie Loss Bye

=== Regular season ===
All start times are local time

Week	Day	Date	Kickoff	Opponent	Results		Location
Week	Day	Date	Kickoff	Opponent	Score	Record	Location
1	Saturday	February 20	8:05pm	at Billings Wolves	W 51-28	1-0	Rimrock Auto Arena at MetraPark
2	Friday	February 26	7:05pm	Cedar Rapids Titans	W 54-45	2-0	Denny Sanford Premier Center
3	Sunday	March 6	3:05pm	at Green Bay Blizzard	W 49-31	3-0	Resch Center
4	BYE						
5	Sunday	March 20	4:00pm	at Colorado Crush	W 58-55	4-0	Budweiser Events Center
6	Saturday	March 26	7:05pm	at Cedar Rapids Titans	L 57-60	4-1	U.S. Cellular Center
7	BYE						
8	Saturday	April 9	7:05pm	Cedar Rapids Titans	W 62-49	5-1	Denny Sanford Premier Center
9	Saturday	April 16	7:05pm	Wichita Falls Nighthawks	W 71-44	6-1	Denny Sanford Premier Center
10	Saturday	April 23	7:05pm	at Nebraska Danger	W 62-44	7-1	Eihusen Arena
11	Saturday	April 30	7:05pm	Green Bay Blizzard	W 66-59	8-1	Denny Sanford Premier Center
12	Friday	May 6	7:00pm	at Wichita Falls Nighthawks	W 66-58	9-1	Kay Yeager Coliseum
13	Saturday	May 14	7:05pm	Spokane Empire	W 63-50	10-1	Denny Sanford Premier Center
14	Saturday	May 21	7:05pm	Green Bay Blizzard	W 58-24	11-1	Denny Sanford Premier Center
15	Friday	May 27	7:05pm	at Iowa Barnstormers	W 50-49 (OT)	12-1	Wells Fargo Arena
16	Saturday	June 4	7:05pm	Colorado Crush	W 72-59	13-1	Denny Sanford Premier Center
17	Saturday	June 11	7:05pm	Iowa Barnstormers	W 53-30	14-1	Denny Sanford Premier Center
18	Saturday	June 18	7:00pm	at Spokane Empire	W 59-35	15-1	Spokane Veterans Memorial Arena
19	BYE						

==== Standings ====
2016 United Conference
	W	L	T	PCT	PF	PA	GB	STK
y–Sioux Falls Storm	15	1	0	.938	951	720	--	W11
x–Cedar Rapids Titans	12	4	0	.750	781	628	3.0	W7
x–Wichita Falls Nighthawks	11	5	0	.688	1001	861	4.0	W2
Green Bay Blizzard	5	11	0	.313	682	932	10.0	L1
Iowa Barnstormers	4	12	0	.250	737	838	11.0	L7

=== Postseason ===
Round	Day	Date	Kickoff	Opponent	Results		Location
Round	Day	Date	Kickoff	Opponent	Score	Record	Location
Wild Card	BYE						
United Conference Championship	Saturday	July 16	7:05pm	Cedar Rapids Titans	W 54-28	1-0	Denny Sanford Premier Center
2016 United Bowl	Saturday	July 23	7:05pm	Spokane Empire	W 55-34	2-0	Denny Sanford Premier Center

== Roster ==
2016 Sioux Falls Storm roster
Quarterbacks: 8 Lorenzo Brown; 2 Carrington Hanna; Running backs: 22 Rolandan Finch; Wide receivers: 11 Marcus Beaurem; 18 Caleb Holley; 4 Brandon Johnson-Farrell; 23 Mike Tatum; 1 Korey Williams	Offensive linemen: 71 Kyle Bryant; 69 Rashaud Mungro; 55 Charlie Sanders; 75 Myniya Smith; Defensive linemen: 56 Byron Bennett; 58 Sam Campbell; 15 Claude Davis; 95 Bryan Keys; 34 Brandon Peguese; 47 Roosevelt Roberts	Linebackers: 3 Tyler Knight; Defensive backs: 16 J'Vontez Blackmon; 6 Elijah Fields; 12 Matt Hermanson; 13 Jonathon Setzer; 24 Carlton Watkins; Kickers: 19 Justin Syrovatka	Injury reserve: 2 Melvin German WR; -- Chris Thompson OL; Exempt list: Currently vacant; Refused to report: 9 Gareef Glashen DB; 2 Jon Wolf QB; Rookies in italics Roster updated June 23, 2016; 25 Active, 4 Inactive
