= 2016 Spokane Empire season =

Indoor Football League team season

- Owner: IFL Partners, LLC (Nader Naini, Managing Owner)
- General manager: Ryan Eucker
- Head coach: Adam Shackleford
- Home stadium: Spokane Veterans Memorial Arena; 720 W. Mallon Ave. Spokane, WA 99201

Results
- Record: 12–4
- Conference place: 1st
- Playoffs: Won Intense Conference Championship 55–44 (Danger); Lost 2016 United Bowl 34–55 (Storm)

The 2016 Spokane Empire season was the eleventh season for the professional indoor football franchise and first in the Indoor Football League (IFL). One of ten teams that compete in the IFL for the 2016 season and members of the Intense Conference.

Led by head coach Adam Shackleford, the Empire play their home games at the Spokane Veterans Memorial Arena in Spokane, Washington.

== Schedule ==
Key: Win Tie Loss Bye

=== Regular season ===
All start times are local time

Week	Day	Date	Kickoff	Opponent	Results		Location	Attendance
Week	Day	Date	Kickoff	Opponent	Score	Record	Location	Attendance
1	Saturday	February 20	9:05pm	at Tri-Cities Fever	W 60–51	1–0	Toyota Center	3,911
2	Saturday	February 27	9:00pm	Wichita Falls Nighthawks	W 66–65	2–0	Spokane Veterans Memorial Arena	6,325
3	BYE							
4	Saturday	March 12	8:05pm	at Billings Wolves	L 22–30	2–1	Rimrock Auto Arena at MetraPark	3,099
5	BYE							
6	BYE							
7	Friday	April 1	9:00pm	Iowa Barnstormers	W 54–51	3–1	Spokane Veterans Memorial Arena	5,803
8	Saturday	April 9	9:00pm	Colorado Crush	W 97–72	4–1	Spokane Veterans Memorial Arena	5,134
9	Saturday	April 16	7:05pm	at Iowa Barnstormers	W 54–34	5–1	Wells Fargo Arena	6,259
10	Saturday	April 23	9:05pm	at Tri-Cities Fever	W 52–39	6–1	Toyota Center	3,300
11	Friday	April 29	9:00pm	Tri-Cities Fever	W 53–51	7–1	Spokane Veterans Memorial Arena	6,507
12	Saturday	May 7	9:00pm	Billings Wolves	W 75–28	8–1	Spokane Veterans Memorial Arena	4,485
13	Saturday	May 14	7:05pm	at Sioux Falls Storm	L 50–63	8–2	Denny Sanford Premier Center	7,611
14	Friday	May 20	9:00pm	Tri-Cities Fever	W 45–23	9–2	Spokane Veterans Memorial Arena	4,556
15	Friday	May 27	8:30pm	at Colorado Crush	W 55–44	10–2	Budweiser Events Center	1,812
16	Saturday	June 4	9:00pm	Billings Wolves	W 51–41	11–2	Spokane Veterans Memorial Arena	4,154
17	Friday	June 10	7:05pm	at Nebraska Danger	W 25–23	12–2	Eihusen Arena	2,852
18	Saturday	June 18	9:00pm	Sioux Falls Storm	L 35–59	12–3	Spokane Veterans Memorial Arena	5,236
19	Saturday	June 25	7:05pm	at Billings Wolves	L 21–35	12–4	Rimrock Auto Arena at MetraPark	1,390

==== Standings ====
2016 Intense Conference
	W	L	T	PCT	PF	PA	GB	STK
y-Spokane Empire	12	4	0	.750	815	709	--	L2
x-Billings Wolves	8	8	0	.500	643	647	4.0	W2
x-Nebraska Danger	6	10	0	.375	765	794	6.0	W1
Colorado Crush	4	12	0	.250	849	914	8.0	W2
Tri-Cities Fever	3	13	0	.188	577	758	9.0	L9

=== Postseason ===
Round	Day	Date	Kickoff	Opponent	Results		Location	Attendance
Round	Day	Date	Kickoff	Opponent	Score	Record	Location	Attendance
Wild Card	BYE							
Intense Conference Championship	Sunday	July 17	4:00pm	Nebraska Danger	W 55–44	1–0	Spokane Veterans Memorial Arena	5,155
2016 United Bowl	Saturday	July 23	7:05pm	at Sioux Falls Storm	L 34–55	1–1	Denny Sanford Premier Center	9,000

== Roster ==
2016 Spokane Empire roster
Quarterbacks: 8 Aaron Aiken; 11 Charles Dowdell; Running backs: 30 Andrew Pierce; Wide receivers: 19 Diondre Borel; 1 Samuel Charles; 80 J. J. Hayes; 88 Justin Helwege	Offensive linemen: 76 Michael Boyefio; 72 Kyle Fischer; 78 Brandon Haskins; 56 Dave Lefotu; 79 Mike Trice; Defensive linemen: 44 Brett Bowers; 12 Toby Jackson; 93 Ben Perry; 99 Donte Rumph	Linebackers: 47 Nick Haag; 17 Pasquale Vacchio; Defensive backs: 16 Rob Brown; 3 Josh Ferguson; 22 Adrian James; 5 Tyree Robinson; 21 Cassius Sendish; 2 Lorenzo White Jr.; Kickers: 27 Patrick Clarke	Injured reserve: 18 Trevor Kennedy RB; 4 Carl Sims WR; 52 D. J. Yendrey DL; Transfer list: Currently vacant; Refused to report: 86 C. J. Olaniyan DL; 55 Michael Reynolds LB; Rookies in italics Roster updated June 28, 2016; 25 Active, 5 Inactive → More rosters
