= 2016 Iowa Barnstormers season =

Indoor Football League team season

- Owner: Jeff Lamberti
- General manager: John Pettit
- Head coach: Joe Brannen
- Home stadium: Wells Fargo Arena; 730 3rd Street; Des Moines, Iowa 50309

Results
- Record: 4–12
- Conference place: 5th
- Playoffs: did not qualify

The 2016 Iowa Barnstormers season was the team's sixteenth season as a professional indoor football franchise and second in the Indoor Football League (IFL). One of ten teams that compete in the IFL for the 2016 season, the Barnstormers are members of the United Conference.

Led by head coach Joe Brannen, the Barnstormers play their home games at the Wells Fargo Arena in the Des Moines, Iowa.

== Schedule ==
Key: Win Tie Loss Bye

=== Pre-season ===
Week	Day	Date	Kickoff	Opponent	Results		Location
Week	Day	Date	Kickoff	Opponent	Score	Record	Location
1	Friday	February 12	7:05pm	at Cedar Rapids Titans	W 59–50		U.S. Cellular Center

=== Regular season ===
All start times are local time

Week	Day	Date	Kickoff	Opponent	Results		Location	Attendance
Week	Day	Date	Kickoff	Opponent	Score	Record	Location	Attendance
1	Saturday	February 20	8:00 PM	at Colorado Crush	W 56–50	1–0	Budweiser Events Center	2,172
2	Friday	February 26	7:05 PM	Green Bay Blizzard	W 73–21	2–0	Wells Fargo Arena	6,672
3	BYE							
4	Friday	March 11	7:05 PM	at Wichita Falls Nighthawks	L 47–74	2–1	Kay Yeager Coliseum	2,046
5	BYE							
6	Saturday	March 26	8:05 PM	at Billings Wolves	W 38–27	3–1	Rimrock Auto Arena at MetraPark	1,771
7	Friday	April 1	9:00 PM	at Spokane Empire	L 51–54	3–2	Spokane Veterans Memorial Arena	5,803
8	Friday	April 9	7:05 PM	Nebraska Danger	L 43–46	3–3	Wells Fargo Arena	6,343
9	Saturday	April 16	7:05 PM	Spokane Empire	L 34–54	3–4	Wells Fargo Arena	6,259
10	Sunday	April 24	3:05 PM	at Green Bay Blizzard	L 72–73	3–5	Resch Center	3,772
11	Friday	April 29	7:05 PM	at Nebraska Danger	W 37–30	4–5	Eihusen Arena	3,022
12	Saturday	May 7	7:05 PM	Colorado Crush	L 56–93	4–6	Wells Fargo Arena	5,896
13	BYE							
14	Saturday	May 21	7:05 PM	at Cedar Rapids Titans	L 33–46	4–7	U.S. Cellular Center	3,648
15	Friday	May 27	7:05 PM	Sioux Falls Storm	L 49–50 (OT)	4–8	Wells Fargo Arena	8,451
16	Saturday	June 4	7:05 PM	Cedar Rapids Titans	L 23–46	4–9	Wells Fargo Arena	5,741
17	Saturday	June 11	7:05 PM	at Sioux Falls Storm	L 30–53	4–10	Denny Sanford Premier Center	6,394
18	Saturday	June 18	7:05 PM	Wichita Falls Nighthawks	L 54–73	4–11	Wells Fargo Arena	5,289
19	Saturday	June 25	7:05 PM	Cedar Rapids Titans	L 41–48	4–12	Wells Fargo Arena	7,143

==== Standings ====
2016 United Conference
	W	L	T	PCT	PF	PA	GB	STK
y–Sioux Falls Storm	15	1	0	.938	951	720	--	W11
x–Cedar Rapids Titans	12	4	0	.750	781	628	3.0	W7
x–Wichita Falls Nighthawks	11	5	0	.688	1001	861	4.0	W2
Green Bay Blizzard	5	11	0	.313	682	932	10.0	L1
Iowa Barnstormers	4	12	0	.250	737	838	11.0	L7

== Roster ==
2016 Iowa Barnstormers roster
Quarterbacks: 7 Brion Carnes; 14 Travis Partridge; 15 Donovan Porterie; Running backs: 9 Robbie Rouse; Wide receivers: 3 Marquise Cushon; 1 Anthony Eboreime; 12 Lucas Hefty; 4 Bryan Pray; 11 Brady Roland	Offensive linemen: 77 Ryan Bubulka; 79 Peter Evans; 62 David Griffin; 66 Chad Kolumber; Defensive linemen: 52 Marquel Combs; 91 Danny Farr; 90 Mike Franklin; 55 Phillip Lewis; 45 Ra'Shawde Myers; 18 Reshard Simmons; 99 Terrance Surratt	Linebackers: 23 Javicz Jones; Defensive backs: 21 Ter'Ran Blanton; 5 Fred Griggs; 10 Chayz Holt; 41 Michael Johnson; 19 Gabe Lynn; 22 Derrick Morgan; Special teams: 20 Jimmy Allen	Reserve lists: 17 Mister Alexander LB (Exempt); 8 Alex Bartlett DB (IR); 5 James Caine DB (DNR); 7 Matt Goldsmith DB (Exempt); 52 Will Harris OL (IR); 35 Manfred Johnson DB (IR); 6 DaeJohn Love DB (IR); -- Aaron Wimberly RB (DNR); Rookies in italics; Roster updated June 23, 2016; 28 Active, 8 Inactive; → More rosters
