= 2016 Cedar Rapids Titans season =

Indoor Football League team season

- Owner: Chris Kokalis; Bob Sullivan; David Bradley; Kenneth Moninski
- General manager: Chris Kokalis
- Head coach: Mark Stoute
- Home stadium: U.S. Cellular Center; 370 1st Avenue NE; Cedar Rapids, IA 52401

Results
- Record: 12-4
- Conference place: 2nd
- Playoffs: Won United Conference Wild Card 66-36 (Nighthawks); Lost United Conference Championship 28-54 (Storm)

The 2016 Cedar Rapids Titans season was the team's fifth season as a professional indoor football franchise and fifth in the Indoor Football League (IFL). One of ten teams that competed in the IFL for the 2016 season, the Titans were members of the United Conference.

Led by head coach Mark Stoute, the Titans played their home games at the U.S. Cellular Center in downtown Cedar Rapids, Iowa.

== Schedule ==
Key: Win Tie Loss Bye

=== Pre-season ===
Week	Day	Date	Kickoff	Opponent	Results		Location
Week	Day	Date	Kickoff	Opponent	Score	Record	Location
1	Friday	February 12	7:05pm	Iowa Barnstormers	L 50–59	0–1	U.S. Cellular Center

=== Regular season ===
All start times are local time

Week	Day	Date	Kickoff	Opponent	Results		Location
Week	Day	Date	Kickoff	Opponent	Score	Record	Location
1	Saturday	February 20	7:05pm	Green Bay Blizzard	W 39-15	1–0	U.S. Cellular Center
2	Friday	February 26	7:05pm	at Sioux Falls Storm	L 45-54	1-1	Denny Sanford Premier Center
3	Friday	March 4	7:05pm	Nebraska Danger	L 71-78	1–2	U.S. Cellular Center
4	Friday	March 11	9:05pm	at Tri-Cities Fever	W 39-34	2-2	Toyota Center
5	BYE						
6	Saturday	March 26	7:05pm	Sioux Falls Storm	W 60-57	3–2	U.S. Cellular Center
7	Saturday	April 2	7:05pm	Green Bay Blizzard	W 70-40	4–2	U.S. Cellular Center
8	Friday	April 9	7:05pm	at Sioux Falls Storm	L 49-62	4–3	Denny Sanford Premier Center
9	Saturday	April 16	7:05pm	Nebraska Danger	W 51-50	5–3	U.S. Cellular Center
10	Friday	April 22	7:05pm	at Wichita Falls Nighthawks	L 57-61	5–4	Kay Yeager Coliseum
11	Saturday	April 30	8:05pm	at Billings Wolves	W 38-31	6–4	Rimrock Auto Arena at MetraPark
12	Saturday	May 7	7:05pm	Tri-Cities Fever	W 58-17	7–4	U.S. Cellular Center
13	Friday	May 13	7:05pm	at Green Bay Blizzard	W 36-12	8–4	Resch Center
14	Saturday	May 21	7:05pm	Iowa Barnstormers	W 46-33	9–4	U.S. Cellular Center
15	BYE						
16	Saturday	June 4	7:05pm	at Iowa Barnstormers	W 46-23	10–4	Wells Fargo Arena
17	Saturday	June 11	7:05pm	Billings Wolves	W 28-20	11–4	U.S. Cellular Center
18	BYE						
19	Saturday	June 25	7:05pm	at Iowa Barnstormers	W 48-41	12–4	Wells Fargo Arena

==== Standings ====
2016 United Conference
	W	L	T	PCT	PF	PA	GB	STK
y–Sioux Falls Storm	15	1	0	.938	951	720	--	W11
x–Cedar Rapids Titans	12	4	0	.750	781	628	3.0	W7
x–Wichita Falls Nighthawks	11	5	0	.688	1001	861	4.0	W2
Green Bay Blizzard	5	11	0	.313	682	932	10.0	L1
Iowa Barnstormers	4	12	0	.250	737	838	11.0	L7

=== Postseason ===
Round	Day	Date	Kickoff	Opponent	Results		Location
Round	Day	Date	Kickoff	Opponent	Score	Record	Location
Wild Card	Saturday	July 9	7:05pm	Wichita Falls Nighthawks	W 66-36	1–0	U.S. Cellular Center
United Conference Championship	Saturday	July 16	7:05pm	at Sioux Falls Storm	L 28–54	1-1	Denny Sanford Premier Center

== Roster ==
2016 Cedar Rapids Titans roster
Quarterbacks: 13 Michael Eubank; 6 Dylan Favre; Running backs: 20 Venric Mark; Wide receivers: 1 Ryan Balentine; 14 Lemans Casimier; 5 Jared Elmore; 15 Dawan Scott; 3 Charles Watkins	Offensive linemen: 78 DeShawn Byrd; 75 Terrence Clark; 98 A. J. Harmon; 67 Sosaia Vaitai; Defensive linemen: 93 Xzavie Jackson; 10 Edward Mosley; 90 Richard Posey; 56 Jeremiah Price; 97 Terrance Woodard	Linebackers: 44 Nikolas Sierra; Defensive backs: 9 Timothy Bennett; 4 Devin Ghafoor; 11 Nathan Lindsey; 7 Kadeem Satchell; 24 Antoine Tharpe; 2 Arius Wright; Kickers: 12 Nicholas Belcher	Injured reserve: 20 Waymon James RB; Refused to report: -- Spencer Ohm QB; -- Henry Orelus OL; -- Nate Willis DB; Transfer list: 5 B. J. Lowery DB; -- Daniel Riley DL; Roster updated June 28, 2016; 25 Active, 6 Inactive
