= 2016 Tri-Cities Fever season =

Indoor Football League team season

- Owner: Teri Carr
- General manager: Teri Carr
- Head coach: Ryan Lingenfelder
- Home stadium: Toyota Center; 7016 West Grandridge Blvd. Kennewick, WA 99336

Results
- Record: 3–13
- Conference place: 5th
- Playoffs: did not qualify

The 2016 Tri-Cities Fever season was the team's twelfth season as a professional indoor football franchise and seventh in the Indoor Football League (IFL). One of ten teams that compete in the IFL for the 2016 season, the Fever are members of the Intense Conference.

Under the leadership of owner/general manager Teri Carr and head coach Adam Shackleford, the team played their home games at the Toyota Center in Kennewick, Washington.

== Schedule ==
Key: Win Tie Loss Bye

=== Regular season ===
All start times are local time

Week	Day	Date	Kickoff	Opponent	Results		Location	Attendance
Week	Day	Date	Kickoff	Opponent	Score	Record	Location	Attendance
1	Saturday	February 20	9:05pm	Spokane Empire	L 51–60	0–1	Toyota Center	3,911
2	Saturday	February 27	7:05pm	at Nebraska Danger	L 46–47	0–2	Eihusen Arena	2,823
3	Saturday	March 5	8:05pm	Billings Wolves	W 47–41	1–2	Toyota Center	3,416
4	Friday	March 11	9:05pm	Cedar Rapids Titans	L 34–39	1–3	Toyota Center	3,416
5	BYE							
6	BYE							
7	Friday	April 1	7:05pm	Colorado Crush	W 37–34	2–3	Toyota Center	3,318
8	Saturday	April 9	7:05pm	at Wichita Falls Nighthawks	L 35–44	2–4	Kay Yeager Coliseum	2,458
9	Friday	April 15	8:30pm	at Colorado Crush	W 39–31	3–4	Budweiser Events Center	2,497
10	Saturday	April 23	9:05pm	Spokane Empire	L 39–52	3–5	Toyota Center	3,300
11	Friday	April 29	9:00pm	at Spokane Empire	L 51–53	3–6	Spokane Veterans Memorial Arena	6,507
12	Saturday	May 7	9:00pm	at Cedar Rapids Titans	L 17–58	3–7	U.S. Cellular Center	3,864
13	Saturday	May 14	9:05pm	Billings Wolves	L 44–49	3–8	Toyota Center	2,800
14	Friday	May 20	9:00pm	at Spokane Empire	L 23–45	3–9	Spokane Veterans Memorial Arena	4,556
15	Saturday	May 28	9:05pm	Green Bay Blizzard	L 39–63	3–10	Toyota Center	1,650
16	BYE							
17	Friday	June 10	7:05pm	at Green Bay Blizzard	L 20–23	3–11	Resch Center	2,272
18	Saturday	June 18	8:05pm	at Billings Wolves	L 23–67	3–12	Rimrock Auto Arena at MetraPark	1,929
19	Saturday	June 25	9:05pm	Nebraska Danger	L 32–52	3–13	Toyota Center	1,745

==== Standings ====
2016 Intense Conference
	W	L	T	PCT	PF	PA	GB	STK
y-Spokane Empire	12	4	0	.750	815	709	--	L2
x-Billings Wolves	8	8	0	.500	643	647	4.0	W2
x-Nebraska Danger	6	10	0	.375	765	794	6.0	W1
Colorado Crush	4	12	0	.250	849	914	8.0	W2
Tri-Cities Fever	3	13	0	.188	577	758	9.0	L9

== Roster ==
2016 Tri-Cities Fever roster
Quarterbacks: 4 Patrick McCain; 10 Will Tudmon; Running backs: 7 Rob Brown; Wide receivers: 8 Akeem Foster; 17 Sheldon Galloway; 1 Chris Gant; 24 Dejuan Miller; 23 Roston Tatum; 11 Jerrell Young	Offensive linemen: 50 William Harris; 60 Jarad Martin; 59 Jairus Spain; Defensive linemen: 96 Omoniyi Adebayo; 14 Austin Alber; 91 Roosevelt Holiday; 13 Dame Ndiaye; 93 Brandon Rankin	Linebackers: 34 Marcell Coke; 27 Ricardo Thompson; Defensive backs: 21 Boubacar Cissoko; 6 Ronald Fields; 3 Stephen Godbolt; 29 Trayon Maxie; 2 Bradley Njoku; 26 Tre Watson; Kickers: 12 Daniel Zeidman	Injured Reserve: 20 Dee Maggitt DB; 22 Brandon Wilson LB; Refused to report: currently vacant; Transfer list: currently vacant; rookies in italics Roster updated June 21, 2016; 26 Active, 2 Inactive → More rosters
