= 2016 Colorado Crush season =

Indoor Football League team season

- Owner: Tom Wigley
- General manager: Heron O'Neal
- Head coach: Heron O'Neal
- Home stadium: Budweiser Events Center; 5290 Arena Circle; Loveland, Colorado 80538

Results
- Record: 4–12
- Conference place: 4th
- Playoffs: did not qualify

The 2016 Colorado Crush season was the tenth season for the professional indoor football franchise and eighth in the Indoor Football League (IFL). It was the first season of the franchise being labeled the Crush after playing the previous nine seasons under the Ice moniker. One of ten teams that competed in the IFL for the 2016 season, the Crush were members of the Intense Conference.

Led by head coach Heron O'Neal, the Crush played their home games at the Budweiser Events Center in Loveland, Colorado.

== Schedule ==
Key: Win Tie Loss Bye

=== Regular season ===
All start times are local time

Week	Day	Date	Kickoff	Opponent	Results		Location
Week	Day	Date	Kickoff	Opponent	Score	Record	Location
1	Saturday	February 20	8:00pm	Iowa Barnstormers	L 50–56	0–1	Budweiser Events Center
2	Sunday	February 28	4:00pm	Billings Wolves	L 30–47	0–2	Budweiser Events Center
3	Friday	March 4	7:05pm	at Wichita Falls Nighthawks	L 45–65	0–3	Kay Yeager Coliseum
4	BYE						
5	Sunday	March 20	4:00pm	Sioux Falls Storm	L 55–58	0–4	Budweiser Events Center
6	BYE						
7	Friday	April 1	9:00pm	at Tri-Cities Fever	L 34–37	0–5	Toyota Center
8	Saturday	April 9	8:30pm	at Spokane Empire	L 72–97	0–6	Spokane Veterans Memorial Arena
9	Friday	April 15	7:05pm	Tri-Cities Fever	L 31–39	0–7	Budweiser Events Center
10	Sunday	April 24	4:00pm	at Billings Wolves	L 61–64	0–8	Rimrock Auto Arena at MetraPark
11	Friday	April 29	8:30pm	Wichita Falls Nighthawks	W 60–47	1–8	Budweiser Events Center
12	Saturday	May 7	7:05pm	at Iowa Barnstormers	W 93–56	2–8	Wells Fargo Arena
13	Saturday	May 14	8:00pm	Wichita Falls Nighthawks	L 61–65	2–9	Budweiser Events Center
14	Saturday	May 21	8:05pm	at Billings Wolves	L 39–49	2–10	Rimrock Auto Arena at MetraPark
15	Friday	May 27	8:30pm	Spokane Empire	L 44–55	2–11	Budweiser Events Center
16	Saturday	June 4	7:05pm	at Sioux Falls Storm	L 59–72	2–12	Denny Sanford Premier Center
17	Saturday	June 11	7:05pm	at Wichita Falls Nighthawks	W 61–56	3–12	Kay Yeager Coliseum
18	Saturday	June 18	8:00pm	Nebraska Danger	W 54–51 (OT)	4–12	Budweiser Events Center
19	BYE						

==== Standings ====
2016 Intense Conference
	W	L	T	PCT	PF	PA	GB	STK
y-Spokane Empire	12	4	0	.750	815	709	--	L2
x-Billings Wolves	8	8	0	.500	643	647	4.0	W2
x-Nebraska Danger	6	10	0	.375	765	794	6.0	W1
Colorado Crush	4	12	0	.250	849	914	8.0	W2
Tri-Cities Fever	3	13	0	.188	577	758	9.0	L9

== Roster ==
2016 Colorado Crush roster
Quarterbacks: 19 Damien Fleming; Running backs: 5 Josh Ford; Wide receivers: 8 Kyle Kaiser; 1 Jermaine Jones; 7 Demarius Washington; 12 Alex Wheat; 15 Doug Williams	Offensive linemen: 75 James Atoe; 78 Kenneth Maryon; 66 Scott Stuller; 55 Bill Vavau; Defensive linemen: 92 Braylon Broughton; 33 Tevin Davis; 97 J. D. Griggs; 99 Khalid Wilson; 90 Armonti Yharbrough	Linebackers: 58 Austin Jacques; 10 Jake Johnson; Defensive backs: 6 Dominique Bridges; 3 Daniel Masifilo; 24 Carl Miles, Jr.; 28 Quinton Richardson; 21 L. J. Stroman; 2 Rashard Smith; Kickers: 20 Spencer Groner	Reserve lists: 4 Breon Allen RB (DNR); 90 Derrick Billups DL (IR); 5 Louis Covington DB (IR); 1 Darnell Evans DB (IR); 58 Nai Fotu LB (IR); 3 Evan Frierson LB (IR); 97 David Gilbert DL (DNR); -- Michael Howell OL (IR); -- Kamalie Matthews OL (Exempt); -- Jerome McGee WR (IR); 9 Brandon Mitchell QB (IR); -- Dante Moses OL (DNR); 9 Corey Sample DB (IR); -- Jesse Somsei OL (Exempt); Rookies in italics Roster updated June 16, 2016; 25 Active, 14 Inactive → More rosters
