= Steve Young (Washington politician) =

American politician (1950–2019)

40th Mayor of Kennewick, Washington
- In office 2009–2017
- Preceded by: Jim Beaver
- Succeeded by: Don Britain

Personal details
- Born: February 24, 1950; Tulsa, Oklahoma, U.S.
- Died: May 16, 2019 (aged 69); Kennewick, Washington, U.S.
- Education: University of Tulsa (BA)

Steve Young (February 24, 1950 – May 16, 2019) was an American politician who served as the 40th mayor of Kennewick, Washington. He also held positions at the Hanford Site, a contractor the Department of Energy, including Vice President of Mission Support Alliance.

== Early life and education ==
Young was born in on February 24, 1950, in Tulsa, Oklahoma. He studied economics at the University of Tulsa before moving to Kennewick in 1986.

== Career ==
Young worked at the Hanford Site as a budget and program manager for prime contractors as well as working at the Office of River Protection. He became Vice President of Portfolio Management at Mission Support Alliance's Richland Operations Office in 2011.

He served as Chairman of the Planning Commission, promoting economic development in the region, as well as being Chairman of Kennewick's Civil Service Commission, which deals with public safety.

Young's political service started by serving as one of the seven original board members of the Kennewick Public Facilities District, where he was assigned the role of overseeing the design and construction of the Three Rivers Convention Center and the Tri-Cities Business and Visitor Center, both of which are located adjacent to the Toyota Center.

He was appointed to the Kennewick City Council in 2008 after former Kennewick mayor, Jim Beaver, was elected as Benton County Commissioner. Young was elected mayor by the city council in 2009, where he served for four consecutive terms until 2017, when he resigned and was replaced by Don Britain, another city councilor who had been serving since 2010. He was the second-longest-serving mayor in the city's history.

=== Lawsuit ===
In 2015, a former Hanford manager sued Young and Mission Support Alliance for retaliation and discrimination after they forced her to retire. Leading to trial, the courts sanctioned Young and Mission Support Alliance for withholding evidence and hiding a key witness. In October 2017, a jury awarded the former Hanford manager $8.1 million in restitution. Young resigned as mayor of Kennewick in December 2017 after serving in the position for four terms, citing recent changes in the city council. He remained serving as a city councilman. In 2018, a recall petition was filed against Young. Young sought to block the recall petition, but it was allowed to move forward by the courts.

== Personal life ==
Young and his wife, Anita, had three children.

On May 16, 2019, Young died from cancer.
