= 2016 Green Bay Blizzard season =

Indoor Football League team season

- Owner: Larry Treankler; Kathy Treankler; Ahman Green
- Head coach: Chris Williams
- Home stadium: Resch Center

Results
- Record: 5-11
- Conference place: 4th
- Playoffs: did not qualify

The 2016 Green Bay Blizzard season was the team's fourteenth season as a professional indoor football franchise and seventh in the Indoor Football League (IFL). One of ten teams that competed in the IFL for the 2016 season, the Green Bay Blizzard were members of the United Conference.

Led by head coach Chris Williams, the Blizzard played their home games at the Resch Center in the Green Bay suburb of Ashwaubenon, Wisconsin.

== Schedule ==
Key: Win Tie Loss Bye

=== Regular season ===
All start times are local time

Week	Day	Date	Kickoff	Opponent	Results		Location	Attendance
Week	Day	Date	Kickoff	Opponent	Score	Record	Location	Attendance
1	Saturday	February 20	7:05pm	at Cedar Rapids Titans	L 15-39	0-1	U.S. Cellular Center	3,742
2	Friday	February 26	7:05pm	at Iowa Barnstomers	L 21-73	0-2	Wells Fargo Arena	6,672
3	Sunday	March 6	3:05pm	Sioux Falls Storm	L 31-49	0-3	Resch Center	3,727
4	Saturday	March 12	7:05pm	at Nebraska Danger	L 37-48	0-4	Eihusen Arena	2,988
5	Friday	March 18	7:05pm	Nebraska Danger	W 66-60 OT	1-4	Resch Center	2,813
6	BYE							
7	Saturday	April 2	7:05pm	at Cedar Rapids Titans	L 40-70	1-5	U.S. Cellular Center	3,847
8	BYE							
9	Friday	April 15	7:05pm	Billings Wolves	L 34-55	1-6	Resch Center	4,435
10	Sunday	April 24	3:05pm	Iowa Barnstormers	W 73-72	2-6	Resch Center	3,772
11	Saturday	April 30	7:05pm	at Sioux Falls Storm	L 59-66	2-7	Denny Sanford Premier Center	7,063
12	Friday	May 6	7:05pm	Nebraska Danger	W 69-68	3-7	Resch Center	3,431
13	Friday	May 13	7:05pm	Cedar Rapids Titans	L 12-36	3-8	Resch Center	2,743
14	Saturday	May 21	7:05pm	at Sioux Falls Storm	L 24-58	3-9	Denny Sanford Premier Center	6,373
15	Saturday	May 28	7:05pm	at Tri-Cities Fever	W 63-39	4-9	Toyota Center	1,650
16	Saturday	June 4	7:05pm	at Wichita Falls Nighthawks	L 40-81	4-10	Kay Yeager Coliseum	2,451
17	Friday	June 10	7:05pm	Tri-Cities Fever	W 23-20	5-10	Resch Center	2,272
18	BYE							
19	Saturday	June 25	7:05pm	Wichita Falls Nighthawks	L 75-98	5-11	Resch Center	4,096

==== Standings ====
2016 United Conference
	W	L	T	PCT	PF	PA	GB	STK
y–Sioux Falls Storm	15	1	0	.938	951	720	--	W11
x–Cedar Rapids Titans	12	4	0	.750	781	628	3.0	W7
x–Wichita Falls Nighthawks	11	5	0	.688	1001	861	4.0	W2
Green Bay Blizzard	5	11	0	.313	682	932	10.0	L1
Iowa Barnstormers	4	12	0	.250	737	838	11.0	L7

== Roster ==
2016 Green Bay Blizzard roster
Quarterback: 16 Matt Behrendt; Running back: 7 Chevelle Buie; 6 Colby Goodwyn; 33 Kehaudas Spence; Wide receiver: 17 DeAndre Brown; 8 Erick Brundidge; 22 Joe Sawyer; 1 Tacoi Sumler; 2 Markeith Summers; 5 Marquel Willis	Offensive linemen: 69 Jordan Mosely; 79 Daniel Quave; 77 Kenneth Woodget; 74 Jeff Younker; Defensive linemen: 99 Tanner Agen; 50 Mason Czekala; 97 Tra'Ray Givens; 94 Harold Legania; 55 David Toriola	Linebacker: 4 Karl Mickelson; Defensive back: 24 Edward Brown; 11 Braelon Davis; 21 Matt Moro; 10 J. D. Roussel; Kicker: 19 Zeke Arevalo	Injured Reserve: 15 Chris Baker DL; 18 Jack Bramswig WR; 99 Cory Grissom DL; 9 Ridge James DL; -- Adrian Nelson QB; 14 Demarkus Perkins DB; -- Ryan Smith DL; 70 Dyron White OL; Transfer List: currently vacant; Refused to Report: -- Colton Miles-Nash DL; rookies in italics Roster updated June 23, 2016; 24 Active, 8 Inactive → More rosters
