= 2016 Nebraska Danger season =

Indoor Football League team season

- Owner: Charlie Bosselman
- Head coach: Mike Davis
- Home stadium: Eihusen Arena; 700 East Stolley Park Rd. Grand Island, NE 68801

Results
- Record: 6-10
- Conference place: 3rd
- Playoffs: Won Intense Conference Wild Card 64-52 (Wolves); Lost Intense Conference Championship 44-55 (Empire)

The 2016 Nebraska Danger season was the sixth season for the Nebraska Danger as a professional indoor football franchise and their sixth in the Indoor Football League (IFL). One of ten teams competing in the IFL for the 2016 season, the Nebraska Danger were members of the Intense Conference. For the fifth consecutive year, the team played their home games under head coach Mike Davis in the Eihusen Arena at the Heartland Events Center in Grand Island, Nebraska.

== Schedule ==
Key: Win Tie Loss Bye

=== Pre-season ===
Week	Day	Date	Kickoff	Opponent	Results		Location
Week	Day	Date	Kickoff	Opponent	Score	Record	Location
1	Friday	February 19	7:00pm	at Omaha Beef	W 55-23	1-0	Ralston Arena

=== Regular season ===
All start times are local time

Week	Day	Date	Kickoff	Opponent	Results		Location
Week	Day	Date	Kickoff	Opponent	Score	Record	Location
1	BYE						
2	Saturday	February 27	7:05pm	Tri-Cities Fever	W 47-46	1-0	Eihusen Arena
3	Friday	March 4	7:05pm	at Cedar Rapids Titans	W 78-71	2-0	U.S. Cellular Center
4	Saturday	March 12	7:05pm	Green Bay Blizzard	W 48-37	3-0	Eihusen Arena
5	Friday	March 18	7:05pm	at Green Bay Blizzard	L 60-66 OT	3-1	Resch Center
6	Friday	March 25	7:05pm	Wichita Falls Nighthawks	L 55-64	3-2	Eihusen Arena
7	Saturday	April 2	7:05pm	Billings Wolves	W 45-31	4-2	Eihusen Arena
8	Saturday	April 9	7:05pm	at Iowa Barnstormers	W 46-43	5-2	Wells Fargo Arena
9	Saturday	April 16	7:05pm	at Cedar Rapids Titans	L 50-51	5-3	U.S. Cellular Center
10	Saturday	April 23	7:05pm	Sioux Falls Storm	L 44-62	5-4	Eihusen Arena
11	Friday	April 29	7:05pm	Iowa Barnstormers	L 30-37	5-5	Eihusen Arena
12	Friday	May 6	7:05pm	at Green Bay Blizzard	L 68-69	5-6	Resch Center
13	BYE						
14	Saturday	May 21	7:05pm	at Wichita Falls Nighthawks	L 48-62	5-7	Kay Yeager Coliseum
15	Friday	May 27	7:05pm	Wichita Falls Nighthawks	L 20-44	5-8	Eihusen Arena
16	BYE						
17	Friday	June 10	7:05pm	Spokane Empire	L 23-25	5-9	Eihusen Arena
18	Saturday	June 18	8:00pm	at Colorado Crush	L 51-54 (OT)	5-10	Budweiser Events Center
19	Saturday	June 25	9:05pm	at Tri-Cities Fever	W 52-32	6-10	Toyota Center

==== Standings ====
2016 Intense Conference
	W	L	T	PCT	PF	PA	GB	STK
y-Spokane Empire	12	4	0	.750	815	709	--	L2
x-Billings Wolves	8	8	0	.500	643	647	4.0	W2
x-Nebraska Danger	6	10	0	.375	765	794	6.0	W1
Colorado Crush	4	12	0	.250	849	914	8.0	W2
Tri-Cities Fever	3	13	0	.188	577	758	9.0	L9

=== Postseason ===
Round	Day	Date	Kickoff	Opponent	Results		Location
Round	Day	Date	Kickoff	Opponent	Score	Record	Location
Wild Card	Saturday	July 9	8:05pm	at Billings Wolves	W 64-52	1-0	Rimrock Auto Arena at MetraPark
Intense Conference Championship	Sunday	July 17	4:00pm	at Spokane Empire	L 44-55	1-1	Spokane Veterans Memorial Arena

== Roster ==
2016 Nebraska Danger roster
Quarterbacks: 15 Derrick Bernard; 11 Hunter Wanket; Running backs: 2 Lyle McCombs; Wide receivers: 6 Nick Brassell; 1 Dello Davis; 9 Robert Johnson; 20 O. J. Simpson; 4 Eric Thomas	Offensive linemen: 65 Lawrence Martin IV; 76 Sini Tauauve'a; 71 Kasimili Uitalia; Defensive linemen: 8 Adrian Davis; 29 Justin Edison; 56 Matt Hardison; 45 Jimmy Lawson; 43 Armand Nance; 75 Ino Vitale	Linebackers: 44 Roosevelt Falls; 44 David Santos; Defensive backs: 21 Jabari Gorman; 24 Tony Grimes; 5 Jamerson Love; 10 Okechukwu Okoroha; 26 Shamawn Wright; Special teams: 22 Josh Gable	Reserve lists: -- Darnell Banks DB (IR); 7 Jamie Bender DB (Exempt); -- Johnny King WR (IR); 72 Darius Savage OL (IR); 10 Jameel Sewell QB (Exempt); 13 Michael Taylor LB (IR); 21 Darnell Terrell DB (IR); 52 Trae Tiller DL (IR); 78 Trevis Turner OL (IR); 44 Jovontay Williams DL (IR); Roster updated June 22, 2016; 25 Active, 10 Inactive → More rosters
