= 2016 Billings Wolves season =

Indoor Football League team season

- Owner: Ron Benzel
- General manager: Marc Burr
- Head coach: Chris Dixon
- Home stadium: Rimrock Auto Arena at MetraPark; 308 6th Avenue North; Billings Montana 59101

Results
- Record: 8-8
- Conference place: 2nd
- Playoffs: Lost Intense Conference Wild Card 52-64 (Danger)

The 2016 Billings Wolves season was the second season for the professional indoor football franchise and second in the Indoor Football League (IFL). One of ten teams that compete in the IFL for the 2016 season, the Wolves are members of the Intense Conference.

Led by head coach Chris Dixon, the Wolves play their home games at the Rimrock Auto Arena at MetraPark in Billings, Montana.

== Schedule ==
Key: Win Tie Loss Bye

=== Regular season ===
All start times are local time

Week	Day	Date	Kickoff	Opponent	Results		Location	Attendance
Week	Day	Date	Kickoff	Opponent	Score	Record	Location	Attendance
1	Saturday	February 20	9:05pm	Sioux Falls Storm	L 28-51	0-1	Rimrock Auto Arena at MetraPark	3,947
2	Sunday	February 28	4:00pm	at Colorado Crush	W 47-30	1-1	Budweiser Events Center	2,087
3	Saturday	March 5	8:05pm	at Tri-Cities Fever	L 41-47	1-2	Toyota Center	3,416
4	Saturday	March 12	8:05pm	Spokane Empire	W 30-22	2-2	Rimrock Auto Arena at MetraPark	3,099
5	BYE							
6	Saturday	March 26	8:05pm	Iowa Barnstormers	L 27-38	2-3	Rimrock Auto Arena at MetraPark	1,771
7	Saturday	April 2	7:05pm	at Nebraska Danger	L 31-45	2-4	Eihusen Arena	3,024
8	BYE							
9	Friday	April 15	7:05pm	at Green Bay Blizzard	W 55-34	3-4	Resch Center	4,435
10	Sunday	April 24	4:00pm	Colorado Crush	W 64-61	4-4	Rimrock Auto Arena at MetraPark	2,031
11	Saturday	April 30	8:05pm	Cedar Rapids Titans	L 31-38	4-5	Rimrock Auto Arena at MetraPark	2,437
12	Saturday	May 7	9:00pm	at Spokane Empire	L 28-75	4-6	Spokane Veterans Memorial Arena	4,485
13	Saturday	May 14	9:05pm	at Tri-Cities Fever	W 49-44	5-6	Toyota Center	2,800
14	Saturday	May 21	8:05pm	Colorado Crush	W 49-39	6-6	Rimrock Auto Arena at MetraPark	2,355
15	BYE							
16	Saturday	June 4	9:00pm	at Spokane Empire	L 41-51	6-7	Spokane Veterans Memorial Arena	6,414
17	Saturday	June 11	7:05pm	at Cedar Rapids Titans	L 20-28	6-8	U.S. Cellular Center	2,335
18	Saturday	June 18	9:00pm	Tri-Cities Fever	W 67-23	7-8	Rimrock Auto Arena at MetraPark	1,929
19	Saturday	June 25	7:05pm	Spokane Empire	W 35-21	8-8	Rimrock Auto Arena at MetraPark	1,390

==== Standings ====
2016 Intense Conference
	W	L	T	PCT	PF	PA	GB	STK
y-Spokane Empire	12	4	0	.750	815	709	--	L2
x-Billings Wolves	8	8	0	.500	643	647	4.0	W2
x-Nebraska Danger	6	10	0	.375	765	794	6.0	W1
Colorado Crush	4	12	0	.250	849	914	8.0	W2
Tri-Cities Fever	3	13	0	.188	577	758	9.0	L9

=== Postseason ===
Round	Day	Date	Kickoff	Opponent	Results		Location	Attendance
Round	Day	Date	Kickoff	Opponent	Score	Record	Location	Attendance
Wild Card	Saturday	July 9	8:05pm	Nebraska Danger	L 52-64	0-1	Rimrock Auto Arena at MetraPark	

== Roster ==
2016 Billings Wolves roster
Quarterbacks: -- Kyle Cool; 10 Cory Murphy; Running backs: 6 Jeff Scott; Wide receivers: 26 Willie Downs; 9 Mark Henderson; 1 Alexander McCray; 19 Joe Morrow; 7 Chip Reeves	Offensive linemen: 54 Nick Chartain; 55 Kameron Neal; 51 Nathaniel Ryan; 56 Charles Stevens; Defensive linemen: 17 B. J. Butler; 99 Jesse Dickson; 44 Brandon Harold; 15 Marquaveus Jackson; 42 Chris Martin; -- Cory Richardson; 13 Christopher Turner	Linebackers: 22 Max Davis; Defensive backs: 31 Michael Green; 2 Travonti Johnson; 5 Demetruce McNeal; 24 Vincent Taylor; 3 Norris Wrenn III; Kickers: 11 Cody Barber	Reserve lists: 8 Cartel Brooks RB (IR); 11 Avonte Jones WR (IR); -- Davon Key DB (DNR); 5 Julian Laing RB (DNR); 11 LaSteven McKinney; -- Zaquoya Parham WR (IR); -- Ike Williams DB (DNR); rookies in italics Roster updated June 28, 2016; 26 Active, 7 Inactive → More rosters
