= 2007 Spokane Shock season =

- Head coach: Adam Shackleford
- Home stadium: Spokane Arena

Results
- Record: 12–4
- Division place: 1st AC West
Playoffs
Lost First Round (
) 35–62

The 2007 Spokane Shock season was the second season for the franchise in the af2. Under head coach Adam Shackleford, the Shock finished with a 12–4 regular season record and won the American Conference West Division title. They were eliminated in the first round of the playoffs by the Louisville Fire.

== Off-season ==
Following the Shock’s 2006 ArenaCup championship, several players signed with Arena Football League teams. Head coach Chris Siegfried left to become offensive coordinator of the Kansas City Brigade, and Adam Shackleford was hired as the new head coach.

== Regular season ==
The Shock finished the regular season with a 12–4 record and captured the American Conference West Division championship.

=== Week 1: vs. Stockton Lightning ===
	1	2	3	4	Total
Lightning	0	14	0	21	35
Shock	13	17	7	14	51

at Spokane Veterans Memorial Arena, Spokane, Washington

The Shock opened the season with a 51–35 victory over the Stockton Lightning in front of 10,653 fans.

=== Week 2: vs. Quad City Steamwheelers ===
	1	2	3	4	Total
Steamwheelers	7	14	12	27	60
Shock	6	14	7	18	45

at Spokane Veterans Memorial Arena, Spokane, Washington

The Shock suffered their first home loss of the season, falling 60–45 to the Quad City Steamwheelers.

=== Week 3: at Fort Wayne Fusion ===
	1	2	3	4	Total
Shock	14	7	14	21	56
Fusion	7	21	14	21	63

at Allen County War Memorial Coliseum, Fort Wayne, Indiana

Spokane lost 63–56 on the road to the Fort Wayne Fusion.

=== Week 4: vs. Lubbock Renegades ===
	1	2	3	4	Total
Renegades	7	6	7	6	26
Shock	12	20	7	24	63

at Spokane Veterans Memorial Arena, Spokane, Washington

The Shock rebounded with a 63–26 win over the Lubbock Renegades.

=== Week 5: at Stockton Lightning ===
	1	2	3	4	Total
Shock	7	20	10	21	58
Lightning	7	20	7	21	55

at Stockton Arena, Stockton, California

Spokane earned its first road victory of the season, defeating Stockton 58–55.

=== Week 7: vs. Bakersfield Blitz ===
	1	2	3	4	Total
Blitz	0	19	13	12	44
Shock	21	7	0	0	28

at Spokane Veterans Memorial Arena, Spokane, Washington

The Shock lost at home to the Bakersfield Blitz, 44–28.

=== Week 8: at Boise Burn ===
	1	2	3	4	Total
Shock	13	10	19	20	62
Burn	0	12	8	24	44

at Qwest Arena, Boise, Idaho

Spokane defeated the Boise Burn 62–44 on the road.

=== Week 9: vs. Central Valley Coyotes ===
	1	2	3	4	Total
Coyotes	6	28	15	14	63
Shock	21	19	7	19	66

at Spokane Veterans Memorial Arena, Spokane, Washington

The Shock won a close contest against the Central Valley Coyotes, 66–63.

=== Week 10: vs. Everett Hawks ===
	1	2	3	4	Total
Hawks	7	26	14	0	47
Shock	13	12	14	13	52

at Spokane Veterans Memorial Arena, Spokane, Washington

Spokane defeated the Everett Hawks 52–47.

=== Week 11: at Bakersfield Blitz ===
	1	2	3	4	Total
Shock	0	7	33	0	40
Blitz	14	7	0	0	21

at Rabobank Arena, Bakersfield, California

The Shock defeated Bakersfield 40–21 on the road.

=== Week 12: at Tri-Cities Fever ===
	1	2	3	4	Total
Shock	0	13	14	7	34
Fever	14	6	6	13	39

at Toyota Center, Kennewick, Washington

Spokane fell to the Tri-Cities Fever 39–34.

=== Week 13: vs. Boise Burn ===
	1	2	3	4	Total
Burn	7	21	0	0	28
Shock	20	13	14	13	60

at Spokane Veterans Memorial Arena, Spokane, Washington

The Shock defeated Boise 60–28 at home.

=== Week 14: at Central Valley Coyotes ===
	1	2	3	4	Total
Shock	6	14	28	28	76
Coyotes	14	9	14	20	57

at Selland Arena, Fresno, California

Spokane won a high-scoring game at Central Valley, 76–57.

=== Week 16: vs. Tri-Cities Fever ===
	1	2	3	4	Total
Fever	7	7	7	15	36
Shock	7	7	7	35	56

at Spokane Veterans Memorial Arena, Spokane, Washington

The Shock defeated the Tri-Cities Fever 56–36 to clinch a playoff berth.

=== Week 17: at Amarillo Dusters ===
	1	2	3	4	Total
Shock	20	7	7	21	55
Dusters	0	13	0	6	19

at Amarillo Civic Center, Amarillo, Texas

Spokane defeated Amarillo 55–19 and clinched the West Division title.

=== Week 18: at Everett Hawks ===
	1	2	3	4	Total
Shock	20	12	14	19	65
Hawks	7	15	7	9	38

at Everett Events Center, Everett, Washington

The Shock closed the regular season with a 65–38 victory over Everett.

== Postseason ==
=== First Round: vs. Louisville Fire ===
	1	2	3	4	Total
Fire	14	21	14	13	62
Shock	0	7	14	14	35

at Spokane Veterans Memorial Arena, Spokane, Washington

The Shock were eliminated in the first round of the playoffs, losing 62–35 to the Louisville Fire in front of 8,272 fans.
