= 2016 Wichita Falls Nighthawks season =

Indoor Football League team season

- Owner: Drew Carnes
- Head coach: Billy Back
- Home stadium: Kay Yeager Coliseum

Results
- Record: 11-5
- Conference place: 3rd
- Playoffs: Lost United Conference Wild Card 36-66 (Titans)

The 2016 Wichita Falls Nighthawks season was the second season for the professional indoor football franchise and second in the Indoor Football League (IFL). One of ten teams that competed in the IFL for the 2016 season, the Nighthawks were members of the United Conference.

Led by head coach Billy Back, the Nighthawks played their home games at the Kay Yeager Coliseum in Wichita Falls, Texas.

== Schedule ==
Key: Win Tie Loss Bye

=== Pre-season ===
Week	Day	Date	Kickoff	Opponent	Results		Location
Week	Day	Date	Kickoff	Opponent	Score	Record	Location
1	Monday	February 22	7:05pm	Texas Stealth	W 101-30	1-0	Kay Yeager Coliseum

=== Regular season ===
All start times are local time

Week	Day	Date	Kickoff	Opponent	Results		Location
Week	Day	Date	Kickoff	Opponent	Score	Record	Location
1	BYE						
2	Saturday	February 27	9:00pm	at Spokane Empire	L 65-66	0-1	Spokane Veterans Memorial Arena
3	Friday	March 4	7:05pm	Colorado Crush	W 65-45	1-1	Kay Yeager Coliseum
4	Friday	March 11	7:05pm	Iowa Barnstormers	W 74-47	2-1	Kay Yeager Coliseum
5	BYE						
6	Friday	March 25	7:05pm	at Nebraska Danger	W 64-55	3-1	Eihusen Arena
7	BYE						
8	Saturday	April 9	7:05pm	Tri-Cities Fever	W 44-35	4-1	Kay Yeager Coliseum
9	Saturday	April 16	7:05pm	at Sioux Falls Storm	L 44-71	4-2	Denny Sanford Premier Center
10	Friday	April 22	7:05pm	Cedar Rapids Titans	W 61-57	5-2	Kay Yeager Coliseum
11	Friday	April 29	8:30pm	at Colorado Crush	L 47-60	5-3	Budweiser Events Center
12	Friday	May 6	7:05pm	Sioux Falls Storm	L 58-66	5-4	Kay Yeager Coliseum
13	Saturday	May 14	8:00pm	at Colorado Crush	W 65-61	6-4	Budweiser Events Center
14	Saturday	May 21	7:05pm	Nebraska Danger	W 62-48	7-4	Kay Yeager Coliseum
15	Friday	May 27	7:05pm	at Nebraska Danger	W 44-20	8-4	Eihusen Arena
16	Saturday	June 4	7:05pm	Green Bay Blizzard	W 81-40	9-4	Kay Yeager Coliseum
17	Saturday	June 11	7:05pm	Colorado Crush	L 56-61	9-5	Kay Yeager Coliseum
18	Saturday	June 18	7:05pm	at Iowa Barnstormers	W 73-54	10-5	Wells Fargo Arena
19	Saturday	June 25	7:05pm	at Green Bay Blizzard	W 98-75	11-5	Resch Center

==== Standings ====
2016 United Conference
	W	L	T	PCT	PF	PA	GB	STK
y–Sioux Falls Storm	15	1	0	.938	951	720	--	W11
x–Cedar Rapids Titans	12	4	0	.750	781	628	3.0	W7
x–Wichita Falls Nighthawks	11	5	0	.688	1001	861	4.0	W2
Green Bay Blizzard	5	11	0	.313	682	932	10.0	L1
Iowa Barnstormers	4	12	0	.250	737	838	11.0	L7

=== Postseason ===
Round	Day	Date	Kickoff	Opponent	Results		Location
Round	Day	Date	Kickoff	Opponent	Score	Record	Location
Wild Card	Saturday	July 9	7:05pm	at Cedar Rapids Titans	L 36-66	0-1	U.S. Cellular Center

== Roster ==
2016 Wichita Falls Nighthawks roster
Quarterbacks: 1 Charles McCullum; 14 Jerell Norton; Running backs: 2 Edward Wesley; 3 Tyler Williams; Wide receivers: 15 Troy Evans; 4 Jordan Jolly; 10 Tyron Laughinghouse; 5 Ja-Mes Logan	Offensive linemen: 75 Jarve Dean; 72 Antonio Foster; 55 Anthony Jackson; 61 Clint Marsh; 92 Garrison Ushery; Defensive linemen: 99 Malcolm Goines; 11 Terrance Lloyd; 52 Toni Pulu; 77 Walter Thomas	Linebackers: 8 Rickey Simpson; Defensive backs: 25 Neiko Conway; 9 Cardelro Jones; 6 Elisha Olabode; 20 Deante Purvis; 7 Kenny Veal; 27 Patrick Wells; Kickers: 12 Rockne Belmonte	Injured reserve: 14 Shavodrick Beaver QB (IR); -- Devin Johnson DB (IR); 27 Dom Joseph DB (IR); 92 Jonathan Mathis DL (IR); -- Matt Milton WR (IR); -- Jimmy Pipkin WR (IR); 52 Tino Tuilata OL (IR); Transfer: 7 Josh Francis LB (Exempt); Refused to report: Currently vacant; Rookies in italics Roster updated June 28, 2016; 25 Active, 8 Inactive
