= Adam Shackleford =

American football coach

San Diego Strike Force
- Title: Assistant head coach and director of scouting

Career information
- Position: Center
- College: Anderson (IN)

Career history
- Anderson (IN) (1998) Graduate assistant - tight ends; Anderson (IN) (1999–2006) Offensive line coach; Cincinnati Swarm (2003) Offensive line coach and director of football operations; Louisville Fire (2004–2006) Offensive coordinator and assistant head coach; Spokane Shock (2007–2009) Head coach; Tri-Cities Fever (2010–2015) Head coach and director of player personnel; Spokane Empire (2016–2017) Head coach; Nebraska Danger (2018) Offensive coordinator and assistant head coach; Nebraska Danger (2018) Interim co-head coach; Frisco Fighters (2022–2023) Director of player personnel and senior offensive consultant; Nashville Kats (2024) Assistant head coach and director of scouting; San Diego Strike Force (2025–present) Run game coordinator and director of scouting

Awards and highlights
- ArenaCup champion (2009)

Adam Shackleford is an American professional indoor football coach who is the run game coordinator and director of scouting for the San Diego Strike Force of the Indoor Football League (IFL).

== Playing career ==
Shackleford played football in high school, and afterwards at Anderson University in Indiana as a center.

== Coaching career ==
After his senior year in 1997, Shackleford joined the Anderson Ravens in 1998 as a graduate assistant, working with the tight ends. He then served as the team's offensive line coach from 1999 to 2006.

He joined the Cincinnati Swarm of the af2 in 2003 as the offensive line coach and director of football operations.

Shackleford was then the offensive coordinator and assistant head coach of the af2's Louisville Fire from 2004 to 2006.

He was head coach of the Spokane Shock of the af2 from 2007 to 2009, compiling a 42–6 regular season record an ArenaCup victory in 2009.

Shackleford was the head coach of the Tri-Cities Fever of the Indoor Football League (IFL) from 2010 to 2015, totaling an overall regular season record of 50–33. He led the Fever to the United Bowl in 2011 and 2012, but lost to the Sioux Falls Storm both times. He was also the team's director of player personnel.

He was then the head coach of the Spokane Empire of the IFL from 2016 to 2017.

He was the offensive coordinator and assistant head coach of the IFL's Nebraska Danger in 2018. Later in 2018, Shackleford served as the team's interim co-head coach with Pig Brown after former head coach Mark Stoute was fired. The duo of Shackleford and Brown went 0–3.

He was the director of player personnel and senior offensive consultant for the Frisco Fighters of the IFL from 2022 to 2023.

Shackleford joined the Nashville Kats of the Arena Football League in 2024 as the team's assistant head coach and director of scouting.

In October 2024, Shackleford became the run game coordinator and director of scouting for the San Diego Strike Force of the IFL.

=== Head coaching record ===
Team	Year	Regular season				Postseason			
Team	Year	Won	Lost	Win %	Finish	Won	Lost	Win %	Result
Spokane Shock	2007	12	4	.750	1st in af2 NC West	0	1	.000	Lost to Louisville Fire in first round
Spokane Shock	2008	15	1	.938	1st in af2 NC West	3	1	.750	Lost to Tennessee Valley Vipers in ArenaCup IX
Spokane Shock	2009	15	1	.938	1st in af2 NC West	4	0	1.000	Won ArenaCup X
Spokane Shock total		42	6	.656		7	2	.778	
Tri-Cities	2010	7	7	.500	3rd in Pacific North Division	0	1	0.000	Lost to Billings Outlaws in first round
Tri-Cities	2011	10	4	.714	2nd in Pacific Division	3	1	.750	Lost to Sioux Falls Storm in 2011 United Bowl
Tri-Cities	2012	12	2	.857	1st in Intense Conference	2	1	.667	Lost to Sioux Falls Storm in 2012 United Bowl
Tri-Cities	2013	6	8	.429	3rd in Intense Conference	0	0	–	
Tri-Cities	2014	8	6	.571	3rd in Intense Conference	0	0	–	
Tri-Cities	2015	8	6	.571	2nd in Intense Conference	0	1	.000	Lost to Nebraska Danger in conference championship
Tri-Cities total		50	33	.602		5	4	.556	
Spokane Empire	2016	12	4	.750	1st in Intense Conference	1	1	.500	Lost to Nebraska Danger in 2016 United Bowl
Spokane Empire	2017	8	8	.500	3rd in Intense Conference	0	0	–	
Spokane Empire total		20	12	.625		1	1	.500	
Nebraska	2018	0	3	.000	4th in IFL	0	1	.000	Lost to Iowa Barnstormers in semifinal
Total		112	54	.675		13	8	.619	

== Personal life ==
Shackleford is a college football television analyst during the offseason.
