= Caleb Holley =

American gridiron football player (born 1990)

Vegas Knight Hawks
- Position: Wide receiver
- Roster status: Active
- CFL status: American

Personal information
- Born: December 26, 1990 (age 35); Albany, Georgia, U.S.
- Listed height: 6 ft 4 in (1.93 m)
- Listed weight: 200 lb (91 kg)

Career information
- High school: Anchorage (AK) East
- College: East Central (OK)
- NFL draft: 2014: undrafted

Career history
- Buffalo Bills (2014–2015)*; Los Angeles KISS (2016)*; Sioux Falls Storm (2016); Saskatchewan Roughriders (2016–2018); Ottawa Redblacks (2019); BC Lions (2020); Edmonton Elks (2022); Vegas Knight Hawks (2023–present)
- * Offseason or practice squad member only

Awards and highlights
- United Bowl champion (2016)

Career CFL statistics
- Receptions: 157
- Receiving yards: 1,963
- Receiving touchdowns: 7
- Stats at CFL.ca
- Stats at Pro Football Reference

Caleb Holley (born December 26, 1990) is an American professional football wide receiver for the Vegas Knight Hawks of the Indoor Football League (IFL). He has also been a member of the Buffalo Bills (NFL), Los Angeles Kiss (AFL), Sioux Falls Storm (IFL), Saskatchewan Roughriders (CFL), Ottawa Redblacks (CFL), and Edmonton Elks (CFL). A native of Anchorage, Alaska, Holley played college football for the East Central Tigers in the Great American Conference (GAC).

== Early life ==
Holley was born in Albany, Georgia, and moved to Anchorage, Alaska, at a young age.

== Professional career ==
=== Early career ===
Holley was signed by the Buffalo Bills in 2014 as an undrafted free agent. He didn't catch on despite two training camps with the team. Holley spent the first part of 2016 with the Sioux Falls Storm of the Indoor Football League. Holley played 11 games in the mid-western indoor league, catching 40 passes for 650 yards and 21 touchdowns. Holley also returned kicks for a total of 168 yards. Holley was named IFL Offensive Player-of-the-Week for Week 9, and by the end of the season, the Storm won the United Bowl championship.

=== Saskatchewan Roughriders ===
In August 2016, Holley signed with the Saskatchewan Roughriders of the Canadian Football League (CFL). During the two years of the rookie contract, Holley surpassed 600 yards each season, and partway through 2017 he was signed to a one-year extension. The Roughriders paid Holley an immediate $20,000 CDN bonus, and the contract was reportedly worth $104,500 CDN for the 2018 CFL season, provided Holley played every game and met performance benchmarks. However, Holley played only 9 games in 2018, and had a career low in catches and yards with just 14 receptions for 213 yards. In addition, Holley did not have a touchdown catch in 2018, and for the second year in a row, Holley missed the Roughriders' playoff games. Following the season Holley and the Riders did not come to an agreement on a new contract, and Holley became a free agent on February 12, 2019.

=== Ottawa Redblacks ===
On February 14, 2019, Holley signed a one-year contract with the Ottawa Redblacks. The 2019 difficult for the Redblacks, finishing with a league-worst 3–15 record. The offense struggled all season after and offensive coordinator Jaime Elizondo's resigned shortly before the start of the season to pursue job in the XFL. Holley's status as a deep threat was not utilized, with the patchwork offensive committee calling up bubble screen for Holley instead. Nevertheless, Holley saw more playing time in Ottawa than he did while with the Riders catching 48 passes for 487 yards. He became a free agent upon the expiry of his contract on February 11, 2020.

=== BC Lions ===
On February 21, 2020, Holley signed with the BC Lions. However, the 2020 CFL season was cancelled and he became a free agent again on February 9, 2021.

=== Edmonton Elks ===
On January 26, 2022, Holley signed with the Edmonton Elks of the Canadian Football League (CFL). On July 29, 2022, Holley was released by the Elks. Holley contributed 8 catches on 16 targets for 101 yards over two games played in Edmonton.

=== Vegas Knight Hawks ===
On September 1, 2022, Holley signed with the Vegas Knight Hawks of the Indoor Football League (IFL).

== Statistics ==
| Receiving | | Regular season | | | | | | Playoffs |
| Year | Team | Games | No. | Yards | Avg | Long | TD | Games | No. | Yards | Avg | Long | TD |
|---|---|---|---|---|---|---|---|---|---|---|---|---|---|
| 2016 | SSK | 11 | 56 | 655 | 11.7 | 44 | 2 | | | Team Did not qualify |
| 2017 | SSK | 13 | 39 | 608 | 15.6 | 75 | 5 | | | Inactive |
| 2018 | SSK | 9 | 14 | 213 | 15.3 | 46 | 0 | | | Inactive |
| 2019 | OTT | 14 | 48 | 487 | 10.1 | 26 | 0 | | | Team Did not qualify |
| CFL totals | | 47 | 157 | 1,963 | 12.5 | 75 | 7 |
