= Claude Davis (American football) =

American football player (born 1989)

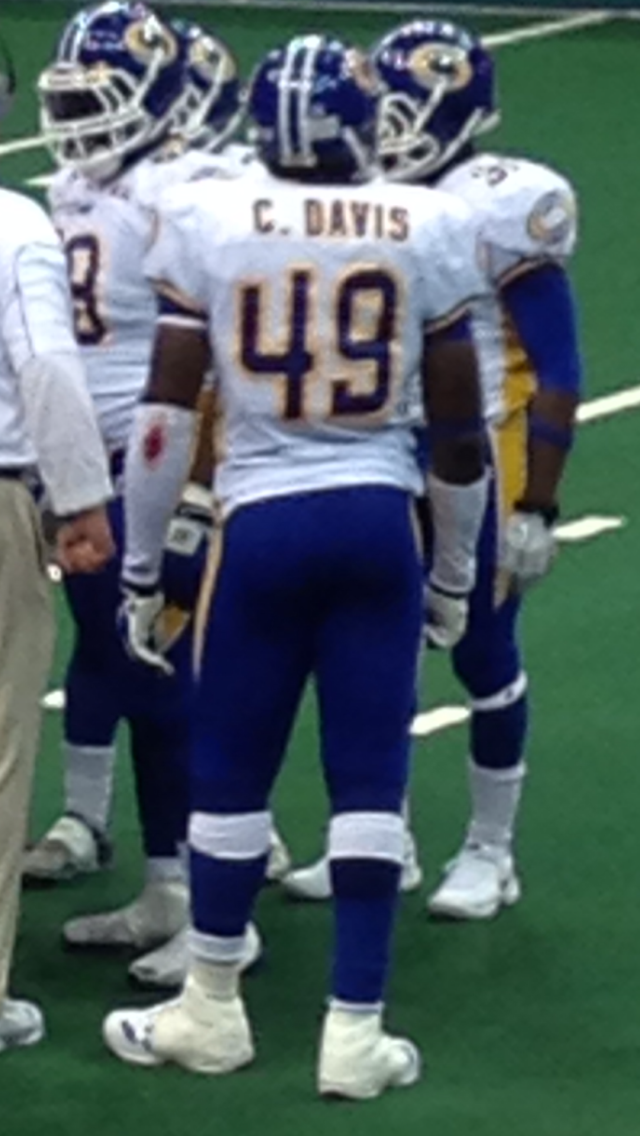
- Davis with the Tampa Bay Storm in 2013

No. 9 – Vegas Knight Hawks
- Position: Defensive end
- Roster status: Active

Personal information
- Born: June 14, 1989 (age 37); Lakeland, Florida, U.S.
- Listed height: 6 ft 4 in (1.93 m)
- Listed weight: 275 lb (125 kg)

Career information
- High school: Lakeland (FL) Lake Gibson
- College: South Florida
- NFL draft: 2012: undrafted

Career history
- New York Jets (2013)*; Tampa Bay Storm (2013); Nebraska Danger (2015); Billings Wolves (2015)*; Sioux Falls Storm (2015—2020); Sioux City Bandits (2020); Sioux Falls Storm (2024); Vegas Knight Hawks (2024, 2025)
- * Offseason or practice squad member only

Awards and highlights
- 4× United Bowl champion (2015, 2016, 2019, 2025); 3× Second-team All-IFL (2016, 2017, 2025)

Career AFL statistics
- Tackles: 2
- Stats at ArenaFan.com

Claude Davis (born June 14, 1989) is an American professional football defensive lineman for the Vegas Knight Hawks of the Indoor Football League (IFL). He was signed by the New York Jets as an undrafted free agent in 2013. He played college football at the University of South Florida.

== Early life ==
Davis attended Lake Gibson High School in Florida. He earned first-team all-state honors in his senior season at Lake Gibson High School. He also played in the North vs. South All-Star Game.

== College career ==
=== East Mississippi Community College ===
He attended East Mississippi Community College where he spend his freshman and sophomore seasons. He was named to the 2009 Mississippi Association of Community & Junior Colleges All-North State First-team. He also was selected to the 2009 NJCAA Preseason All-American First-team. He was selected to the 2008 MACJC All-North State Second-team in his freshman season.

=== University of South Florida ===
Davis spent his junior and senior seasons at the University of South Florida. In his Senior season, he had 16 tackles, 6 sacks, 2 Forced fumbles and one pass deflection.

== Professional career ==
=== New York Jets ===
Davis was signed by the New York Jets on January 2, 2013 to a reserve/future contract. He was waived on April 30, 2013 after being arrested and charged with possession of marijuana.

=== Tampa Bay Storm ===
Davis was assigned to the Tampa Bay Storm of the Arena Football League on May 30, 2013. Davis was reassigned on June 7, 2013. Davis was again assigned by the Storm on June 20, 2013. Davis was reassigned by the Storm on July 2, 2013.

=== Nebraska Danger ===
Davis signed with the Nebraska Danger of the Indoor Football League for 2015. He was released on March 2, 2015.

=== Billings Wolves ===
Davis signed with the Billings Wolves on March 3, 2015.

=== Sioux Falls Storm ===
Just two days after signing with the Wolves, Davis was traded to the Sioux Falls Storm for future considerations. Following the 2016 season, Davis was named a Second-team All-IFL selection. Davis repeated as a Second-team All-IFL selection in 2017. On October 16, 2017, Davis re-signed with the Storm.

=== Sioux City Bandits ===
In March 2020, Davis was to be traded to the San Diego Strike Force, another Indoor Football League team. Unhappy with this, Davis left the Sioux Falls Storm and accepted a position with the Sioux City Bandits a Champions Indoor Football (CIF) team.

=== Return to Sioux Falls ===
In March 2024, Davis returned to the Sioux Falls Storm.
