= Mister Alexander =

American football player (born 1988)

No. 17, 56, 54
- Position: Linebacker

Personal information
- Born: June 2, 1988 (age 38); Aldine, Texas, U.S.
- Listed height: 6 ft 3 in (1.91 m)
- Listed weight: 252 lb (114 kg)

Career information
- High school: Eisenhower (Houston, Texas)
- College: Florida State
- NFL draft: 2011: undrafted

Career history
- Houston Texans (2011−2012); Toronto Argonauts (2013); Omaha Mammoths (2014); Tampa Bay Buccaneers (2014)*; Dallas Cowboys (2014)*; Seattle Seahawks (2015)*; Jacksonville Jaguars (2015)*; Los Angeles KISS (2016); Iowa Barnstormers (2016)
- * Offseason or practice squad member only

Career NFL statistics
- Total tackles: 12
- Stats at Pro Football Reference

Mister Alexander (born June 2, 1988) is an American former professional football player who was a linebacker in the National Football League (NFL). He played college football for the Florida State Seminoles and was signed by the Houston Texans as an undrafted free agent in 2011.

Alexander has also played for the Toronto Argonauts of the Canadian Football League (CFL) and Jacksonville Jaguars.

== Professional career ==
=== Houston Texans ===
After going unselected in the 2011 NFL draft, Alexander signed with the Houston Texans as an undrafted free agent.

=== Toronto Argonauts ===
Alexander was signed by the Toronto Argonauts of the Canadian Football League on June 6, 2013. He was released by the Argonauts on July 25, 2013.

=== Dallas Cowboys ===
On December 26, 2014, the Dallas Cowboys signed Alexander to their practice squad.

=== Seattle Seahawks ===
Alexander signed with the Seattle Seahawks on March 2, 2015. He was waived on June 12.

=== Jacksonville Jaguars ===
On August 24, 2015, Alexander was signed by the Jacksonville Jaguars. He was waived on August 29.

=== Los Angeles KISS ===
On April 7, 2016, Alexander was assigned on Los Angeles KISS.

=== Iowa Barnstormers ===
Alexander signed with the Iowa Barnstormers on May 3, 2016.
