= David Griffin (American football) =

American gridiron football player (born 1991)

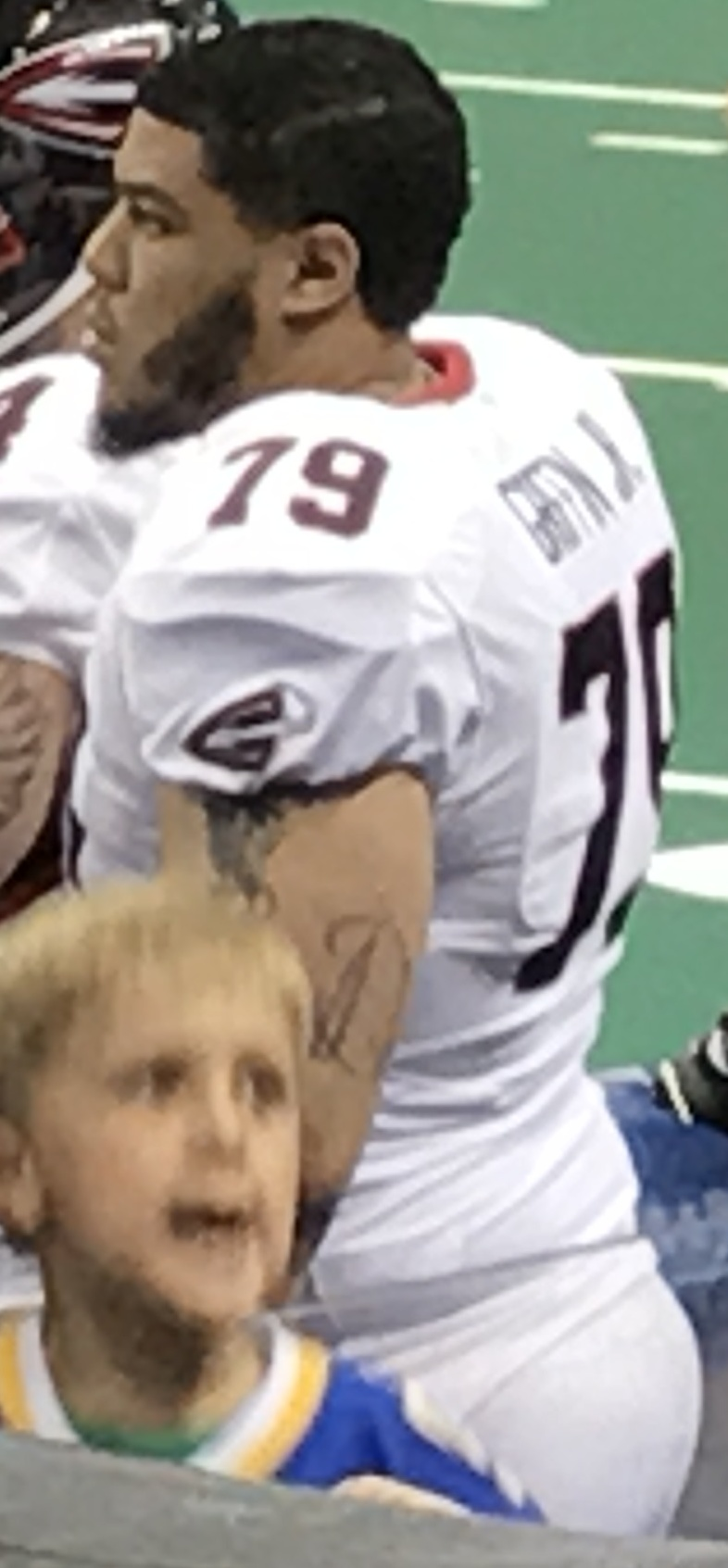
- Griffin in 2017

No. 62, 79, 78, 75, 57
- Position: Offensive lineman

Personal information
- Born: September 26, 1991 (age 35); Tallahassee, Florida
- Listed height: 6 ft 6 in (1.98 m)
- Listed weight: 320 lb (145 kg)

Career information
- High school: Tallahassee (FL) FAMU DRS
- College: Hawaii
- NFL draft: 2015: undrafted

Career history
- Edmonton Eskimos (2015)*; Iowa Barnstormers (2016–2017); Cedar Rapids Titans (2017); Cleveland Gladiators (2017); Columbus Lions (2017); Richmond Roughriders (2018)
- * Offseason or practice squad member only
- Stats at ArenaFan.com

David Christian Griffin, Jr. (born September 26, 1991) is an American former football offensive lineman. He played college football at University of Hawaii at Manoa and attended Florida A&M University Developmental Research School in Tallahassee, Florida. He was a member of the Edmonton Eskimos, Iowa Barnstormers, Cedar Rapids Titans, Cleveland Gladiators, Columbus Lions and Richmond Roughriders.

== Early life ==
Griffin attended North Florida Christian High School through this junior year before transferring to Florida A&M University Developmental Research School in Tallahassee, Florida where he played football and basketball.

== College career ==
Griffin attended Coffeyville Community College in 2010, where he redshirted. In 2011, Griffin transferred to Mesa Community College where he played for the Thunderbirds from 2011 to 2012. Griffin then transferred to the Hawaii Rainbow Warriors from 2013 to 2014. He helped the Rainbow Warriors to 1 win. He played in 5 games during his career including 2 starts at tackle. A tear of his Ulnar collateral ligament of elbow joint ended his career at Hawaii early.

== Professional career ==
Pre-draft measurables
Height	Weight	40-yard dash	10-yard split	20-yard split	20-yard shuttle	Three-cone drill	Vertical jump	Broad jump	Bench press
6 ft 5 in (1.96 m)	300 lb (136 kg)	5.20 s	1.87 s	3.15 s	5.09 s	8.22 s	25 in (0.64 m)	8 ft 3 in (2.51 m)	15 reps
All values from Hawaii Pro Day

=== Edmonton Eskimos ===
Griffin signed with the Edmonton Eskimos on May 31, 2015. Griffin was released on June 14, 2015.

=== Iowa Barnstormers ===
Griffin signed with the Iowa Barnstormers of the Indoor Football League in 2016. Griffin started 9 of 16 games for the Barnstormers. Griffin re-signed with the Barnstormers for 2017. He was released on February 16, 2017.

=== Cedar Rapids Titans ===
On February 21, 2017, Griffin signed with the Cedar Rapids Titans. On March 24, 2017, Griffin was placed on the transfer list.

=== Cleveland Gladiators ===
On March 23, 2017, Griffin was assigned to the Cleveland Gladiators. On April 26, 2017, Griffin was placed on reassignment. On May 1, 2017, Griffin was placed on league suspension.

=== Columbus Lions ===
On May 4, 2017, Griffin signed with the Columbus Lions. On August 4, 2017, Griffin re-signed with the Lions.
