= Dave Lefotu =

American football player (born 1992)

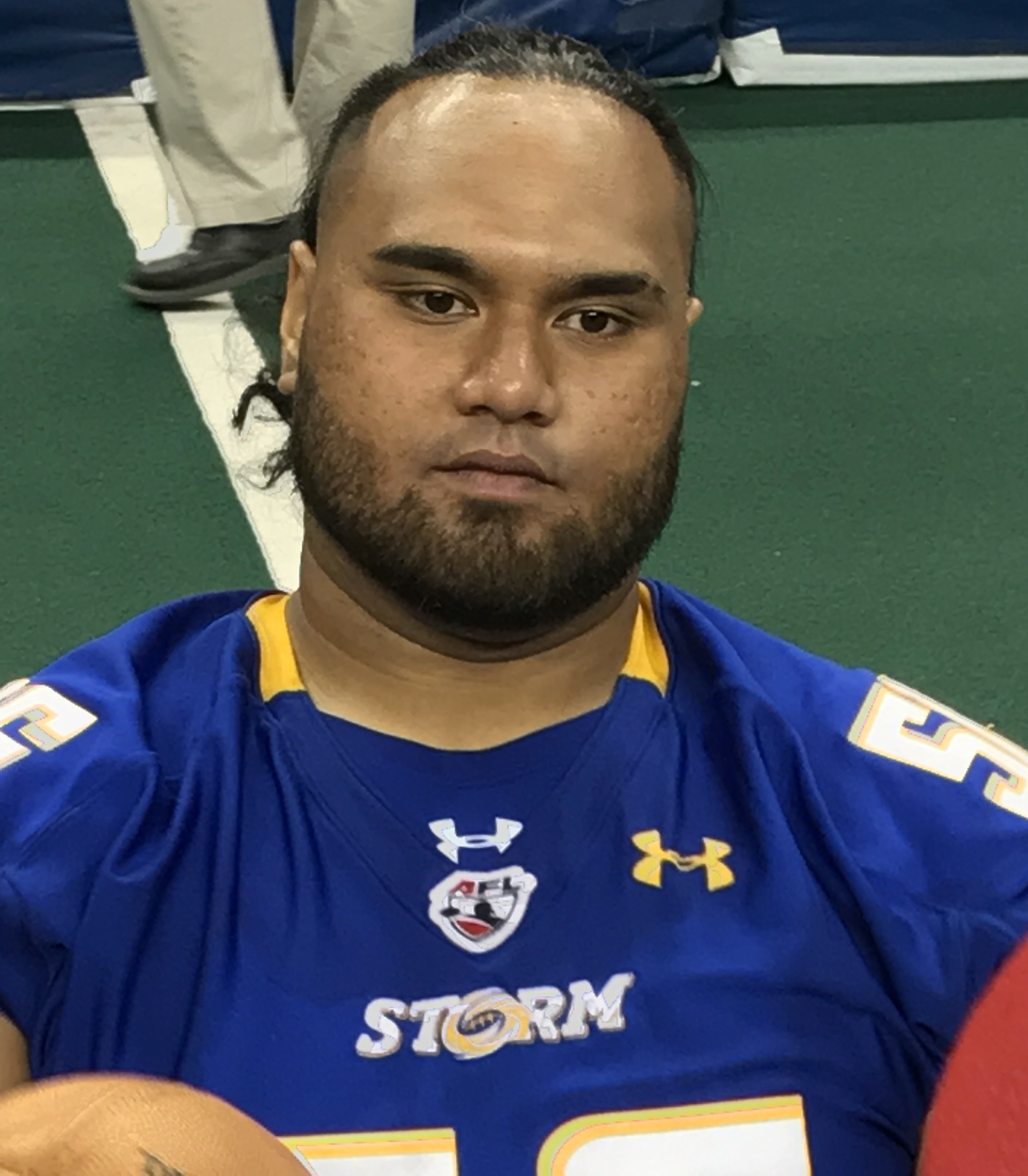
- Lefotu in 2017

Profile
- Position: Offensive lineman

Personal information
- Born: March 25, 1992 (age 34); American Samoa
- Listed height: 6 ft 3 in (1.91 m)
- Listed weight: 320 lb (145 kg)

Career information
- High school: Pearl City (Pearl City, Hawaii, U.S.)
- College: Hawaii
- NFL draft: 2015: undrafted

Career history
- Spokane Empire (2016–2017); Tampa Bay Storm (2017); Albany Empire (2018)*; Spokane Shock (2020–2021)
- * Offseason or practice squad member only

Awards and highlights
- First Team All-IFL (2016)

Career AFL statistics
- Tackles: 1.5
- Sacks: 0.5
- Stats at ArenaFan.com

David Lefotu (born March 25, 1992) is a former American football offensive lineman. He played college football at University of Hawaii at Manoa and attended Pearl City High School in Pearl City, Hawaii. He has been a member of the Spokane Empire, Tampa Bay Storm and Albany Empire.

== College career ==
Lefotu played for the Hawaii Rainbow Warriors from 2010 to 2014. He was the team's starter his final three and a half years and helped the Rainbow Warriors to 14 wins. He played in 44 games during his career including 24 starts at guard.

== Professional career ==
Pre-draft measurables
Height	Weight	40-yard dash	10-yard split	20-yard split	20-yard shuttle	Three-cone drill	Vertical jump	Broad jump	Bench press
6 ft 2 in (1.88 m)	309 lb (140 kg)	5.67 s	1.91 s	3.32 s	5.14 s	8.46 s	25 in (0.64 m)	7 ft 10 in (2.39 m)	24 reps
All values from Hawaii Pro Day

=== Spokane Empire ===
In December 2015, Lefotu signed with the Spokane Empire of the Indoor Football League. Lefotu was named First Team All-IFL Offense as a rookie following the season, helping the Empire to a conference championship and 2016 United Bowl appearance. Lefotu re-signed with the Empire on September 10, 2016.

=== Tampa Bay Storm ===
Lefotu was assigned to the Tampa Bay Storm on January 17, 2017. On July 20, 2017, Lefotu was placed on reassignment.

=== Albany Empire ===
On March 19, 2018, Lefotu was assigned to the Albany Empire. On March 24, 2018, he was placed on recallable reassignment.

== Personal life ==
Lefotu is the nephew of former Washington Redskins, Kili Lefotu.
