= 2016 Indoor Football League season =

2016 IFL season
- League: Indoor Football League
- Sport: Indoor Football
- Duration: February 20, 2016 – July 23, 2016
- Teams: 10

Regular season
- Season MVP: Charles McCullum (Wichita Falls)

Playoffs
- Intense champions: Spokane Empire
- Intense runners-up: Nebraska Danger
- United champions: Sioux Falls Storm
- United runners-up: Cedar Rapids Titans

2016 United Bowl
- Champions: Sioux Falls Storm
- Runners-up: Spokane Empire

IFL seasons
- ← 2015 2017 →

The 2016 Indoor Football League season was the eighth season of the Indoor Football League (IFL). Playing with ten teams in two conferences located primarily in mid-level cities in the central United States, the league's regular season kicked off on February 20, 2016 and ended on June 24, 2016. The playoffs were held in three rounds, with the top seed in each conference receiving a first-round bye as the second and third seeds facing each other in the conference semifinal (both division winners had automatic bids, and the third seed was a wild card), with the winner of that game facing the top seed in a conference championship game followed by the winners of those games meeting in the United Bowl.

== Teams ==
All ten teams from the previous season were scheduled to return, and a new team called the Spokane Empire joined the IFL. The team was originally going to be called the Spokane Shock after the owner of the franchise decided to leave the Arena Football League on September 1, 2015, for the IFL due to easier regional travel. However, on October 12, 2015, the AFL released a statement saying that the franchise and the AFL could not come to terms over the purchase and use of the Shock identity (name, logos, colors, etc.) and that the AFL has retained the rights to the identity. In addition, the IFL accepted the expansion franchise of the Minnesota Havok. Two teams retained their locations but changed their team name; the former Colorado Ice changed its name to the Colorado Crush, and the former Bemidji Axemen changed their name to the Minnesota Axemen.

The IFL originally announced that it would continue with a two-conference format, but would return to having two divisions in each conference, with each of the 12 teams playing 16 games during the 18-week regular season. This was two more teams, games, and weeks than the numbers as played in the 2015 IFL season. However, prior to the season, the league terminated the two Minnesota teams and returned to a division-less two conference format.

Team	Location	Arena	Capacity	Founded	Joined
United Conference
Cedar Rapids Titans	Cedar Rapids, Iowa	U.S. Cellular Center	6,900	2012	2012
Green Bay Blizzard	Green Bay, Wisconsin	Resch Center	8,600	2003	2010
Iowa Barnstormers	Des Moines, Iowa	Wells Fargo Arena	15,181	1995	2015
Sioux Falls Storm	Sioux Falls, South Dakota	Denny Sanford Premier Center	10,678	2000	2009
Wichita Falls Nighthawks	Wichita Falls, Texas	Kay Yeager Coliseum	7,380	2013	2015
Intense Conference
Billings Wolves	Billings, Montana	Rimrock Auto Arena at MetraPark	7,000	2015	2015
Colorado Crush	Loveland, Colorado	Budweiser Events Center	5,289	2007	2009
Nebraska Danger	Grand Island, Nebraska	Eihusen Arena	6,000	2011	2011
Spokane Empire	Spokane, Washington	Spokane Veterans Memorial Arena	10,771	2015	2016
Tri-Cities Fever	Kennewick, Washington	Toyota Center	6,000	2005	2010

== Expansion/Contraction ==
On September 9, 2015, the IFL announced the Minnesota Havok would join the league for the 2016 season. The Havok were to play their home games at Verizon Wireless Center in Mankato, Minnesota, however, the league terminated the franchise prior to the start of the season for failing to meet league obligations.

On November 25, 2015, the Minnesota Axemen franchise was terminated by the league for failing to meet the league's operational standards and commitments.

== Standings ==
2016 Intense Conference
	W	L	T	PCT	PF	PA	GB	STK
y-Spokane Empire	12	4	0	.750	815	709	--	L2
x-Billings Wolves	8	8	0	.500	643	647	4.0	W2
x-Nebraska Danger	6	10	0	.375	765	794	6.0	W1
Colorado Crush	4	12	0	.250	849	914	8.0	W2
Tri-Cities Fever	3	13	0	.188	577	758	9.0	L9

2016 United Conference
	W	L	T	PCT	PF	PA	GB	STK
y–Sioux Falls Storm	15	1	0	.938	951	720	--	W11
x–Cedar Rapids Titans	12	4	0	.750	781	628	3.0	W7
x–Wichita Falls Nighthawks	11	5	0	.688	1001	861	4.0	W2
Green Bay Blizzard	5	11	0	.313	682	932	10.0	L1
Iowa Barnstormers	4	12	0	.250	737	838	11.0	L7

== Playoffs ==
Wild Card Round
United Conference
3	Nebraska	64
2	Billings	52
Intense Conference
3	Wichita Falls	36
2	Cedar Rapids	66

Conference Championships
3	Nebraska	44
1	Spokane	55
2	Cedar Rapids	28
1	Sioux Falls	54

2016 United Bowl
I1	Spokane	34
U1	Sioux Falls	55

== Awards ==
=== Individual season awards ===
Award	Winner	Position	Team
Most Valuable Player	Charles McCullum	Quarterback	Wichita Falls Nighthawks
Offensive Player of the Year	Demarius Washington	Wide receiver	Colorado Crush
Defensive Player of the Year	Jeremiah Price	Defensive lineman	Cedar Rapids Titans
Special Teams Player of the Year	Korey Williams	Wide receiver	Sioux Falls Storm
Offensive Rookie of the Year	Trevor Kennedy	Running back	Spokane Empire
Defensive Rookie of the Year	Jabari Gorman	Defensive back	Nebraska Danger
Most Improved Award	Markeith Summers	Wide receiver	Green Bay Blizzard
Adam Pringle Award	Peter Evans	Offensive lineman	Iowa Barnstormers
Coach of the Year	Billy Back	Head coach	Wichita Falls Nighthawks

=== 1st Team All-IFL ===
Offense
Quarterback	Charles McCullum, Wichita Falls
Running back	Trevor Kennedy, Spokane
Wide receiver	Demarius Washington, Colorado; Brady Roland, Iowa; Jordan Jolly, Wichita Falls
Offensive tackle	Myniya Smith, Sioux Falls; Dave Lefotu, Spokane
Center	Charlie Sanders, Sioux Falls

Defense
Defensive line	Jeremiah Price, Cedar Rapids; Brandon Peguese, Sioux Falls; Xzavie Jackson, Cedar Rapids
Linebacker	Tyler Knight, Sioux Falls
Defensive back	Michael Green, Billings; Rashard Smith, Colorado; Jabari Gorman, Nebraska; Robert Brown, Spokane

Special teams
Kicker	Rockne Belmonte, Wichita Falls
Kick returner	Korey Williams, Sioux Falls

=== 2nd Team All-IFL ===
Offense
Quarterback	Charles Dowdell, Spokane
Running back	Tyler Williams, Wichita Falls
Wide receiver	Markeith Summers, Green Bay; O. J. Simpson, Nebraska; Bryan Pray, Iowa
Offensive tackle	James Atoe, Colorado; A. J. Harmon, Cedar Rapids
Center	Nathaniel Ryan, Billings

Defense
Defensive end	Benjamin Perry, Spokane; Walter Thomas, Wichita Falls; Claude Davis, Sioux Falls
Linebacker	Nikolas Sierra, Cedar Rapids; Nick Haag, Spokane
Defensive back	Boubacar Cissoko, Tri-Cities; Elijah Fields, Sioux Falls; Dee Maggitt, Jr., Tri-Cities

Special teams
Kicker	Nicholas Belcher, Cedar Rapids
Kick returner	Chevelle Buie, Green Bay
