= Three Rivers Convention Center =

Convention center in Washington, United States

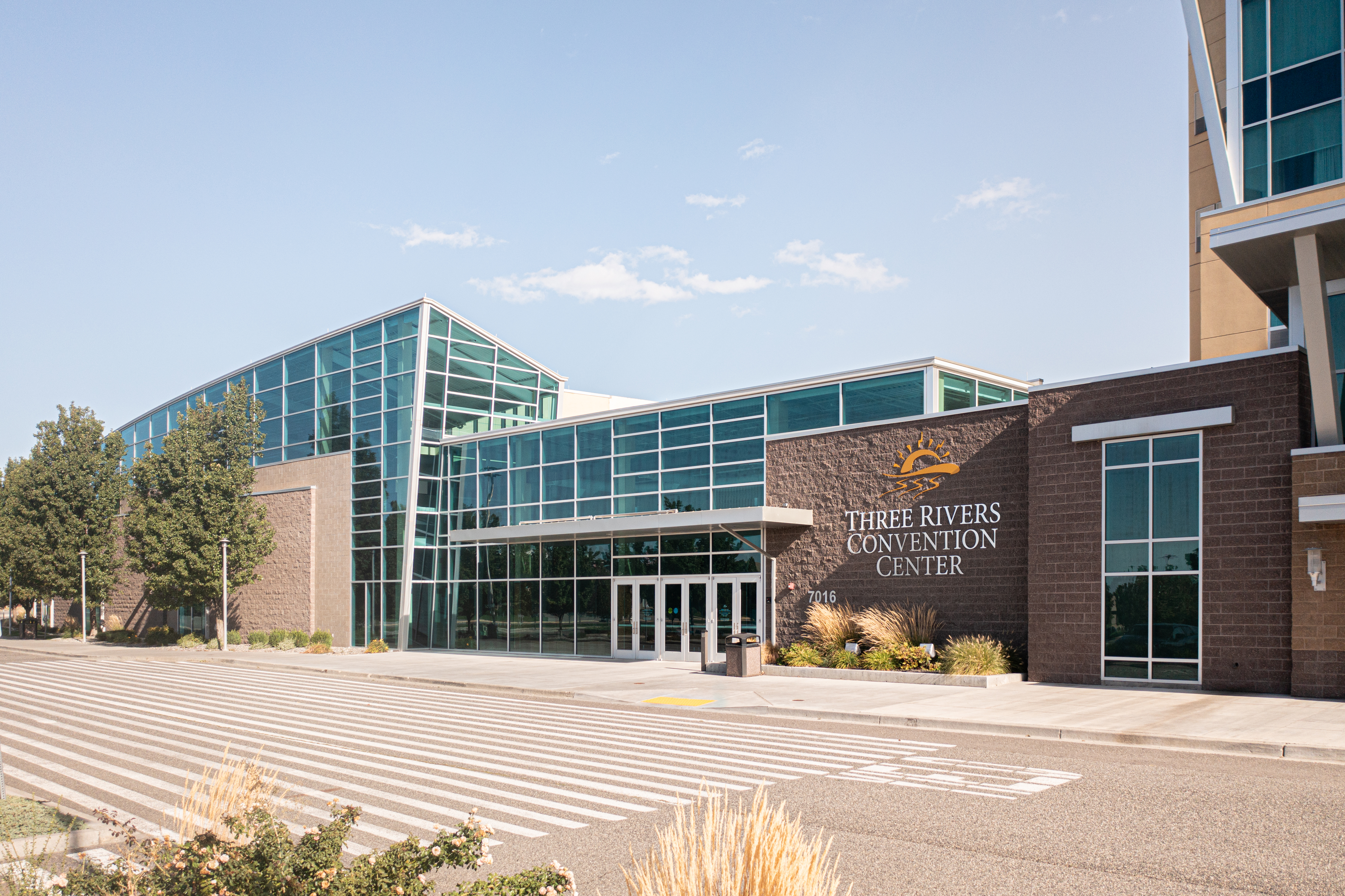
- Interactive map of Three Rivers Convention Center
- Address: 7016 W Grandridge Blvd
- Location: Kennewick, Washington, U.S.
- Coordinates: 46.218°N 119.216°W
- Owner: Kennewick Public Facilities District
- Operator: VenuWorks
- Public transit: Ben Franklin Transit

Convention use
- Exhibit hall floor: 21,600 sq ft (2,010 m^{2})

Construction
- Opened: 2004

Website
- www.threeriversconventioncenter.com

The Three Rivers Convention Center is the primary convention center in Tri-Cities, Washington, a mid-size metropolitan area centered around the cities of Kennewick, Pasco, and Richland. Named after the nearby confluence of the Snake, Yakima, and Columbia Rivers, the center is a part of the Three Rivers Campus in Kennewick, adjacent to the Toyota Center and Toyota Arena. Construction of a 115,000 sq ft expansion and attached hotel began in March 2025.

== History ==
=== Early Proposals and Development ===
The concept of a convention center in Tri-Cities dates back to the late 1970s. Initial plans in the 1980s included an adjacent convention center to the Tri-Cities Coliseum (now the Toyota Center), but was not realized for several decades .

In 2000, the City of Kennewick purchased the Coliseum, transforming it into a public facility. By 2004, the city assigned management to the Kennewick Public Facilities District (KPFD), which then engaged VenuWorks Inc. to oversee daily operations. Construction of the Three Rivers Convention Center commenced the same year, culminating in its opening on June 19, 2004.

== Facility ==
The convention center includes approximately 75,000 square feet of meeting and event space. This consists of a 21,600-square-foot Great Hall, which can be subdivided into three sections, and 13,000 square feet of breakout rooms. Additional spaces include a pre-function lobby, a large foyer, outdoor patio, and support areas. The facility is used for a range of events, including trade shows, conventions, banquets, meetings, and community gatherings.

== Expansion ==
In February 2025, the Kennewick City Council approved plans for the expansion of the Three Rivers Convention Center. The expansion project is being led by the Kennewick Public Facilities District and will be funded through bonds, without the imposition of new taxes. Groundbreaking is anticipated in 2025, with completion expected in late 2026.

The expansion will add approximately 115,000 square feet of new space, including a 60,000 sq ft exhibit hall, 5,000 sq ft of meeting rooms, an expanded lobby and pre-function space, and a new large-scale kitchen.

The expansion is designed to accommodate larger regional events and conferences. According to estimates provided by the KPFD, the expanded facility is projected to host approximately 200,000 attendees per year and generate over 70,000 hotel room nights annually.
