= Alliant Energy PowerHouse =

Building in Iowa, United States

Coordinates: 41°58′48.79″N 91°40′2.79″W

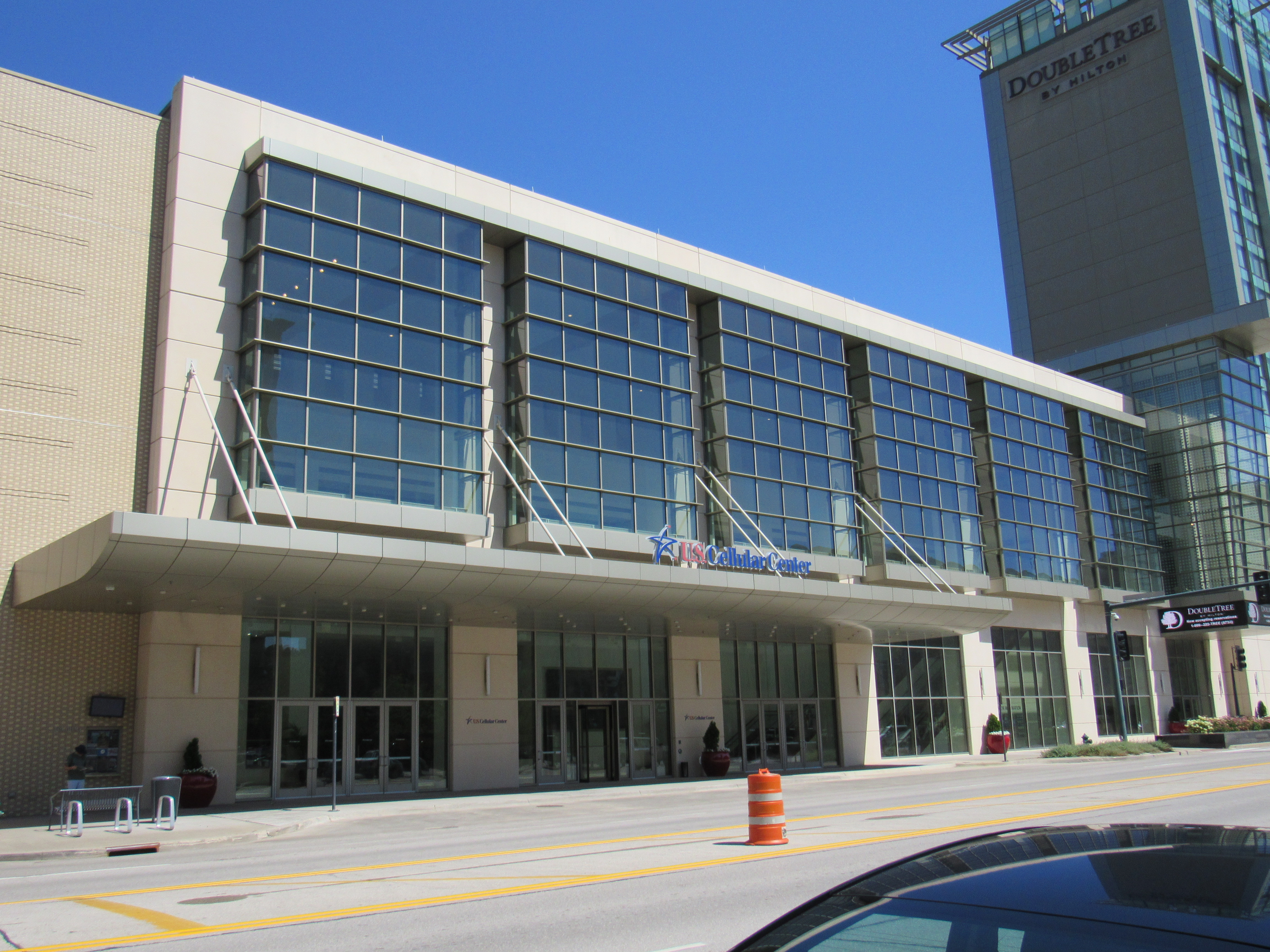
- Former names: Cedar Rapids Civic Center (planning/construction); Five Seasons Center (1979–2000); U.S. Cellular Center (2000–2020)
- Address: 370 1st Ave NE; Cedar Rapids, IA 52401-1108
- Location: Downtown Cedar Rapids
- Owner: City of Cedar Rapids
- Operator: VenuWorks
- Capacity: 9,000

Construction
- Groundbreaking: 1977
- Opened: January 25, 1979
- Renovated: 2011–13
- Closed: July 2011
- Reopened: June 1, 2013
- Cost: $8 million ($42.5 million in 2025 dollars)

Tenants
- Iowa Cornets (WBL) (1979–80); Cedar Rapids Silver Bullets (CBA) (1988–91); Cedar Rapids Sharpshooters (GBA) (1992); Cedar Rapids River Raiders (USBL) (2004); Cedar Rapids Titans (IFL/AIF) (2014–18, 2026–present); Cedar Rapids Rampage (MASL) (2015–18); Iowa Raptors FC (M2) (2022–present)
- Building details

General information
- Renovated: July 2011–May 2013
- Renovation cost: $20 million ($28.6 million in 2025 dollars)

Renovating team
- Architect: OPN Architects
- Other designers: Frew Nations Group; tvsdesign; JLG Architects
- Main contractor: Bernards; AECOM Ellerbe Becket

The Alliant Energy PowerHouse (formerly Five Seasons Center and later U.S. Cellular Center) is a multi-purpose arena located in the downtown area of Cedar Rapids, Iowa. It was financed by the approval of a voter referendum to allocate special municipal capital improvement bond monies, after several prior bond referendums to build a civic center failed between 1965 and 1977. The initial construction cost was approximately $7 million for the arena and facilities. The city approved an additional $1 million to build an adjacent multi-level parking facility connected to the center by a skywalk. The center is adjoined by a 16-story DoubleTree hotel facility built directly above the arena.

== About the venue ==
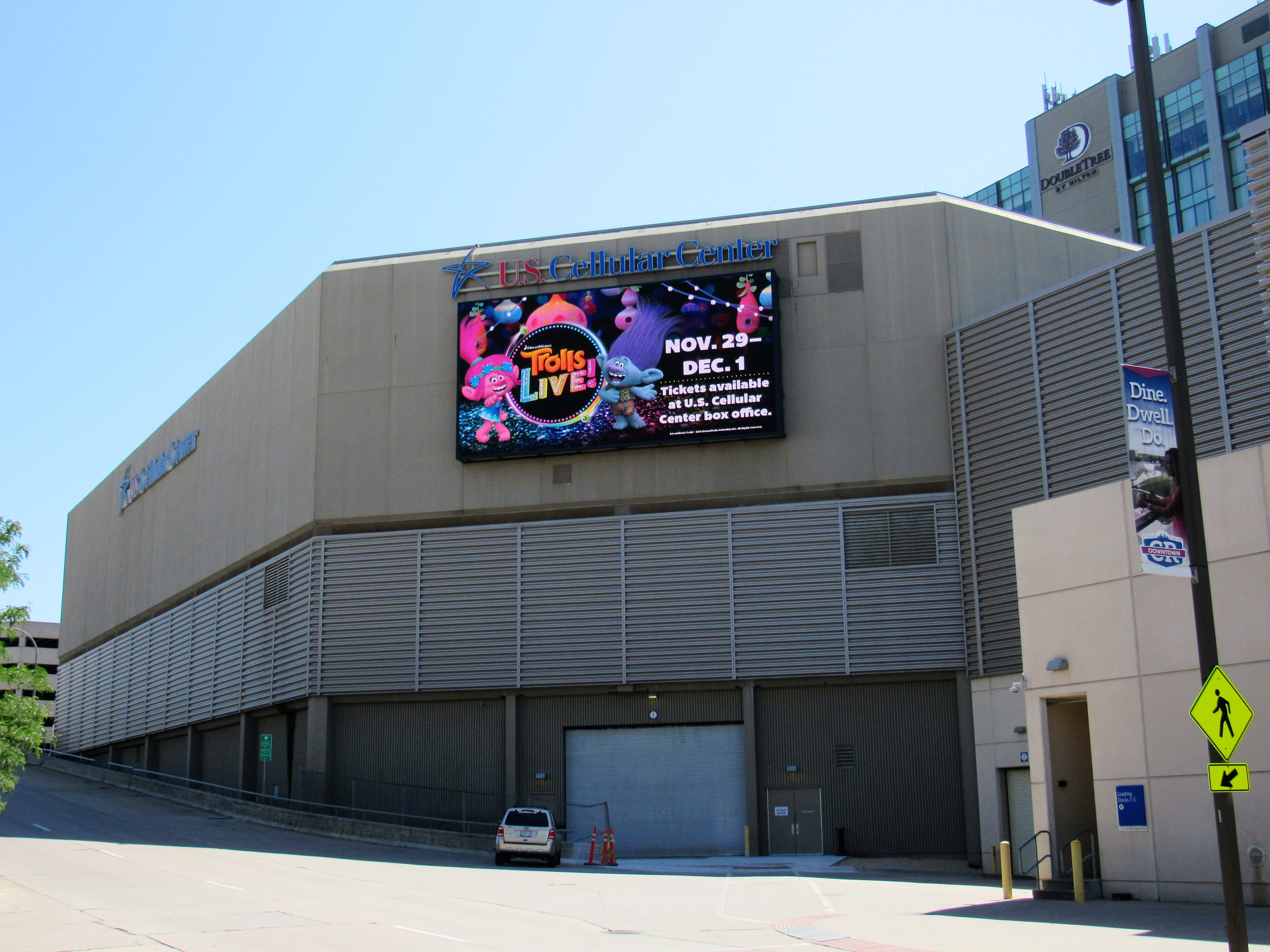
Arena exterior

The center was opened in 1979 as the Five Seasons Center and hosted the English progressive-rock band Yes as its first official concert event on April 25, 1979. The arena has a basketball capacity of about 6,900 and can seat up to 8,600 for concerts.

The center hosted local sporting events, including the Iowa High School Girls State Volleyball Tournament until 2021 and the Iowa High School Boys State Wrestling Dual Championships until 2011.

It served as the primary sports and entertainment venue in Eastern Iowa until the completion of Carver–Hawkeye Arena in Iowa City four years later. With the opening of Xtream Arena in nearby Coralville (a suburb of Iowa City), the venue has lost more events. Former professional tenants include the Cedar Rapids River Raiders of the United States Basketball League, the Cedar Rapids Sharpshooters of the Global Basketball Association, and the Cedar Rapids Silver Bullets of the Continental Basketball Association. Numerous commencement ceremonies are held at the arena.

The venue hosted the initial World Championship Wrestling (WCW) Souled Out event in 1997. It also hosted WCW's Clash of the Champions XXVIII event in 1994 and a WCW Monday Nitro event in 1999. As the Five Seasons Center, it was the site of two early Ultimate Fighting Championship events: UFC 21 in 1999, and UFC 26 the following year. One notable wrestling match in 1989 had Andre the Giant arrested by police after attacking a KCRG-TV photographer filming the match. He was charged with assault and later acquitted, though he was still fined for criminal mischief and damage to KCRG's equipment.

In early June 2008, the U.S. Cellular Center was flooded with water from the Iowa flood of 2008.

The arena closed in July 2011 to undergo renovations as part of a larger project to build a convention complex around the site, which also includes renovations to the new DoubleTree by Hilton Hotel. Events were diverted to other venues in the area, including the ImOn Ice Arena (also managed by VenuWorks) and Carver-Hawkeye Arena, during that time. The complex reopened for a concert by Lady Antebellum on June 1, 2013. It was selected as the host arena for the NCAA Division II National Volleyball tournament from December 12–14, 2013.

It was home to the Cedar Rapids Titans/River Kings of the Indoor Football League from 2014 to 2019, and they have played in American Indoor Football since 2024.

On October 17, 2014, U.S. Cellular Center held an NBA preseason game between the Milwaukee Bucks and Minnesota Timberwolves.

The City of Cedar Rapids announced on October 23, 2020, that it had reached a naming rights agreement with Alliant Energy, the region's electricity provider, that took effect July 1 and lasts twelve years.

=== Naming history ===
- Five Seasons Center (January 25, 1979–August 2000)
- U.S. Cellular Center (August 2000–June 30, 2020)
- Alliant Energy PowerHouse (July 1, 2020–present)

== Noted performers ==
- AC/DC
- Alan Jackson
- Barry Manilow
- Dierks Bentley
- Dolly Parton
- Elton John
- Eric Clapton
- Flyleaf
- Godsmack
- Grateful Dead
- John Denver
- John Mellencamp
- Keith Urban
- Kenny Chesney
- Kenny Rogers
- Kid Rock
- KISS
- Korn
- Marilyn Manson
- MC Hammer
- Metallica
- Nickelback
- The Oak Ridge Boys
- Ozzy Osbourne
- Red Hot Chili Peppers
- Tesla
- Toby Keith
- Trans-Siberian Orchestra
- Van Halen
- Widespread Panic
- Yes
- ZZ Top

Events and tenants
Preceded by Boutwell Memorial Auditorium; Yoyogi National Gymnasium	Ultimate Fighting Championship venue UFC 21; UFC 26	Succeeded by Lake Charles Civic Center; Lakefront Arena
