= Denny Sanford Premier Center =

Indoor arena in Sioux Falls, South Dakota, U.S.

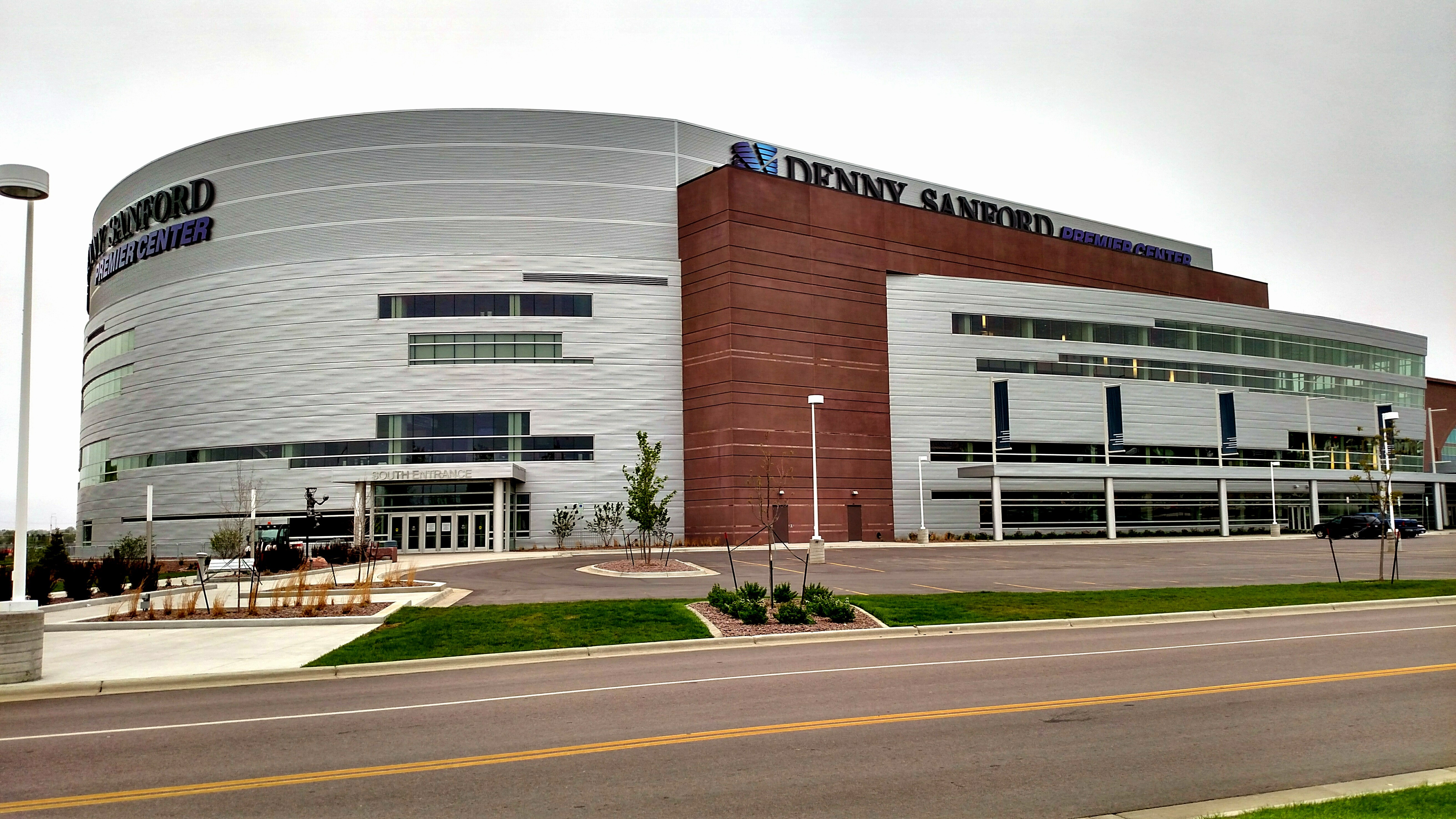
- Interactive map of Denny Sanford Premier Center
- Address: 1201 N West Ave
- Location: Sioux Falls, South Dakota, U.S.
- Coordinates: 43°33′42″N 96°45′00″W
- Owner: City of Sioux Falls
- Operator: ASM Global
- Capacity: 13,000 (Concerts); 12,000 (Basketball); 10,600 (Indoor Football); 10,678 (Hockey)

Construction
- Groundbreaking: August 30, 2012
- Opened: September 19, 2014
- Cost: $117 million ($159 million in 2025 dollars)
- Architects: Sink Combs Dethlefs; Koch Hazard
- Structural engineers: Martin/Martin, Inc.
- Services engineers: M–E Engineers, Inc.
- General contractor: Mortenson Construction

Tenants
- Sioux Falls Stampede (USHL) (2014–present); Sioux Falls Storm (IFL) (2015–2024)

Website
- dennysanfordpremiercenter.com

The Denny Sanford Premier Center is an indoor arena in Sioux Falls, South Dakota, United States. The building is located at 1201 North West Avenue, and is connected to the Sioux Falls Arena and Sioux Falls Convention Center. The Arena's naming rights partners, and largest sponsors, are Sanford Health, First PREMIER Bank and PREMIER Bankcard.

Completed in 2014, the arena has a seating capacity of approximately 12,000 spectators and replaces the DakotaDome and The Monument as the largest indoor venue in South Dakota. The Sioux Falls Arena hosts smaller concerts and events, while the Denny Sanford PREMIER Center hosts large scale concerts and sporting events.

== History ==
=== Background ===
The Sioux Falls Arena, located in Sioux Falls, South Dakota, began construction in 1959. Designed by Spitznagel and Associates, the arena featured a capacity of 7,500 people when it opened in 1961. The Sioux Falls Arena hosted concerts, events, and several sports teams. These included the Sioux Falls Skyforce of the Continental Basketball Association, the Sioux Falls Stampede of the United States Hockey League, and the Sioux Falls Storm of the Indoor Football League.

The population of Sioux Falls at the time of its opening was about 65,000 people. By 2000, The population had nearly doubled to 124,000 people. While a replacement of the arena had been considered since 1999, it wouldn't be until a new events center was put to a public vote in a special election in 2011, that construction would begin. By a vote of 23,284 to 16,807, Sioux Falls citizens passed the events center special ballot, allowing design and construction of a new events center to begin. Breaking ground on August 30, 2012, it was built on the west side of the Sioux Falls Convention Center.

=== Construction ===
Construction officially began on August 30, 2012. The Sioux Falls-based Sanford Health purchased the naming rights to the arena, contributing about $2 million to construction. The City of Sioux Falls spent $115 million on construction, bringing the total cost to $117 million. Denny Sanford Premier Center officially opened on September 19, 2014.

== Events ==
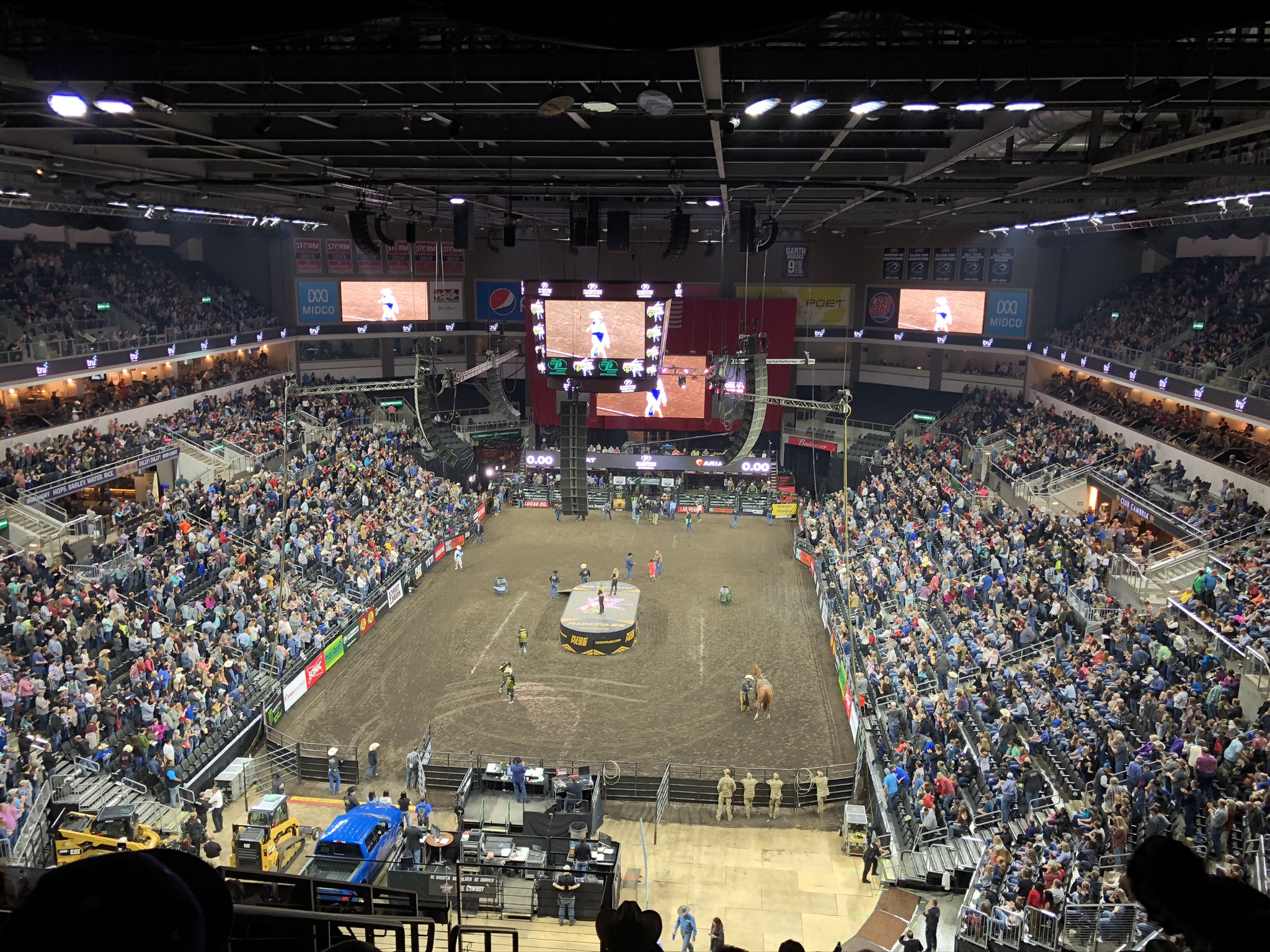
Denny Sanford PREMIER Center hosting the Professional Bull Riders on April 7, 2019.

The first concert, Joan Jett and the Blackhearts and Starship featuring Mickey Thomas was held on September 24, 2014. On October 3, 2014, Jason Aldean and Florida Georgia Line performed with Tyler Farr.

Slipknot, along with guests Korn and opening band King 810, performed as part of the "Prepare for Hell" tour on November 9, 2014. Eric Church and Dwight Yoakam performed at the venue on December 6, 2014 as part of The Outsiders World Tour.

The PREMIER Center hosts the Summit League men's and women's basketball tournaments every year in March. The winners receive automatic berths in the NCAA Division I men's and women's tournaments. In 2024, the Men's and Women's Championships set a tournament record with more 73,000 attending the tournament. The women's tournament broke their attendance record as well with over 36,000 people attending their games. The attendance of 36,504 ranked 4th in the country for a women's conference tournament behind only the Big Ten, ACC, and SEC.

The arena also hosts the Sioux Falls Stampede of the United States Hockey League and up until October 30, 2024 it also hosted the Sioux Falls Storm of the Indoor Football League (currently dormant due to leasing dispute with The PREMIER Center).

In 2016, the PREMIER Center hosted a regional for the NCAA Women's DI Basketball Tournament. Syracuse defeated Tennessee in the regional final to advance to the Final Four held in Indianapolis.

From 2015 to 2017, the Professional Bull Riders (PBR) association hosted an annual Built Ford Tough Series event. Since 2017 the PBR has hosted an Unleash the Beast Series event at the PREMIER Center, known as the First PREMIER Bank/PREMIER Bankcard Invitational.

Shania Twain brought her Rock This Country Tour to the arena on September 23, 2015. She returned for her Shania Now Tour on May 16, 2018. James Taylor performed there with his band.

Paul McCartney kicked off the Midwest leg of his One on One Tour at the arena on May 2, 2016. This marked his first performance in South Dakota as well as McCartney's first-ever performance as a solo artist of "A Hard Day's Night" and the first time the song was performed by a Beatle in half a century since the Beatles played it for the last time on 31 August 1965 at the Cow Palace in Daly City, California.

In 2017, Garth Brooks sold a record 106,918 tickets for nine sold-out shows at the venue as part of his World Tour.

On May 13, 2024 the Sioux Falls Sports Authority announced that the PREMIER Center had secured the bid to host the 2025 U.S. Olympic team trials for men's and women's curling as well as the U.S. Paralympic team trials for wheelchair mixed doubles curling. The trials took place from November 7–16, 2025. The winners of the trials represented the United States at the 2026 Milano-Cortina Winter Olympic and Paralympic Games.

== Notable Performers ==
In the relatively short history of the PREMIER Center, the venue has hosted a wide variety of concerts and many notable performers including; Paul McCartney, Elton John, Eagles, Shania Twain, Nickelback, Demi Lovato, Eric Church, Morgan Wallen, Luke Combs, Thomas Rhett, Ed Sheeran, Kenny Chesney, Rod Stewart, Def Leppard, Mötley Crüe, Lil Wayne, Rascal Flatts, Florida Georgia Line, Dolly Parton, Toby Keith, Garth Brooks, Pentatonix, Carrie Underwood, Blake Shelton, Foo Fighters, Kiss, Fleetwood Mac, Journey, Metallica, Smashing Pumpkins, Imagine Dragons, Reba McEntire, Cher, Snoop Dogg, Chris Stapleton, Lauren Daigle, Kane Brown, Kelsea Ballerini, Brooks & Dunn, Greta Van Fleet, Backstreet Boys, Cody Johnson, Jelly Roll, Luke Bryan, Tim McGraw Toto and Faith Hill.
