= MetraPark =

Complex in Billings, Montana, U.S.

Coordinates: 45°48′00″N 108°28′38″W

- Interactive map of MetraPark
- Location: 308 6th Avenue North; Billings, MT 59101-1500
- Owner: Yellowstone County

Website
- www.metrapark.com

MetraPark is a multi-use complex located in Billings, Montana. It consists of the First Interstate Arena, Outdoor Arena, Montana Pavilion, Expo Center, fairgrounds and other buildings. The complex covers 189 acres.

== History ==
A study of the economic impact in 2022 showed that MetraPark generated $110.7 million for the local economy. It determined that 819,000 guests attended or participated in an event and that 37.8 percent were from out of area. They also estimated MetraPark provided for 2,694 full and part-time jobs. During fiscal year 2022-23 there were 388 events, with the Professional Bull Riders event earning the most with $219,274. The total revenue was $9,916,000, with total expenses of $8,639,000.

In the wake of President Trump's 2025 calls for mass deportations, the county commissioners offered MetraPark as a potential space to detain illegal immigrants. This was met by backlash from Yellowstone County residents. During a commission meeting it was declared that no use of Yellowstone County taxes would be used and that no sheriff or jail personnel would be offered. They assured that the offer was merely a possibility. After the meeting, protests were held in front of MetraPark. The sponsor of the arena at the time, First Interstate Bank, said they were not contacted prior to the proposal, though they do not control how the county uses the arena or other facilities. During three January County Commissioner meetings, residents urged the commission to rescind their letter. In February, the general manager of MetraPark made a statement that none of the buildings would be utilized as a detention facility.

== First Interstate Arena ==
The arena has a capacity of 8,700 for ice hockey and indoor football games, 10,500 for basketball, and up to 12,000 for concerts. The arena hosts a variety of local sporting, musical, and other events. It has also hosted professional sporting competitions. Due to tornado damage the arena was renovated in 2010 and 2011 at a cost of $27 million. The county owned facility spent millions in the early 2020s using the American Rescue Plan Act of 2021. The money was used to upgrade utilities, facilities, security, lighting, connectivity, and the hardtop at MetraPark.

In 2025, MetraPark Arena marked its 50th anniversary.

=== History ===
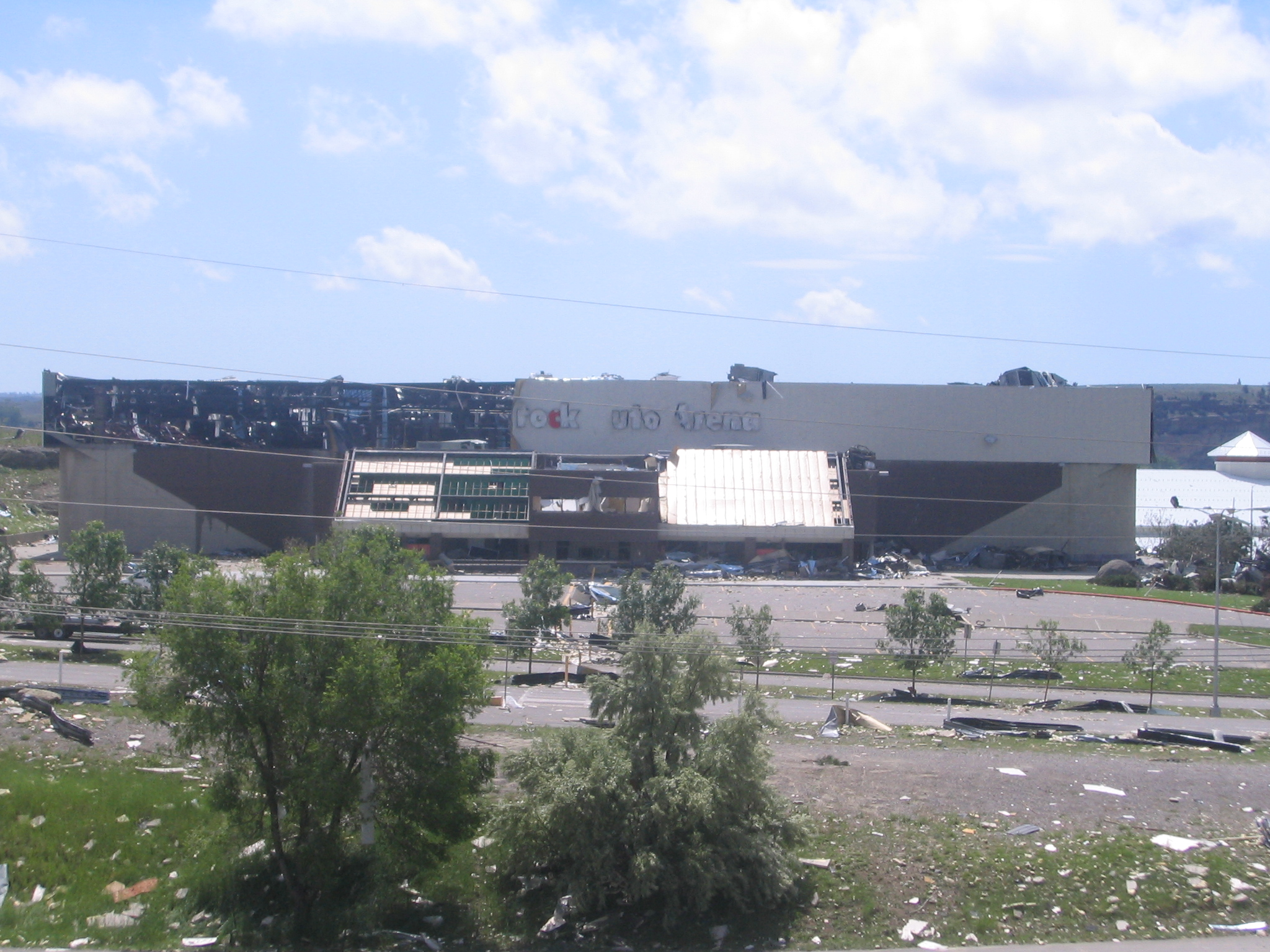
The arena after the 2010 Billings tornado

The arena was completed in 1975 and named the METRA, an acronym that stands for Montana Entertainment Trade and Recreation Arena. It was built at the Midland Empire Fairgrounds, which later was renamed MetraPark, at which time the arena became MetraPark Arena. The naming rights were sold to Billings-based Rimrock Auto Group in 2007 and the arena went by the name Rimrock Auto Arena at MetraPark. It is owned by Yellowstone County. On June 20, 2010, the Father's Day Tornado hit the arena, causing major damage In 2010–2011 the arena was remodeled, resulting in many new amenities such as improved acoustics, more restrooms and concession areas, and easier access from the parking areas. The arena is an energy efficient building with contemporary aesthetics. On April 10, 2011, with the outer arena still under construction, Elton John played the first concert in the Arena since the tornado.

=== Sponsorship ===
On February 21, 2007, Rimrock Auto Group announced a 10-year, US $1 million naming rights deal for the arena. Beginning July 1, 2007 it became known as the Rimrock Auto Arena at MetraPark. On June 3, 2019, First Interstate Bank announced a 5-year US $875,000 naming rights deal for the arena, making it First Interstate Arena at MetraPark.

=== Events ===
==== Concerts ====
The Arena remains the largest indoor concert venue in Montana and hosts an average of 9–12 concerts each year. In 2015, The Eagles set a record for the largest grossing concert at the venue, grossing $1.4 million in tickets sold.

Other major concert performances at the arena included Aerosmith, Beach Boys, Black Sabbath, Garth Brooks, Johnny Cash, Cher, Def Leppard, John Denver, Neil Diamond, Elton John, Fleetwood Mac, Foo Fighters, Foreigner, Merle Haggard, Jethro Tull, Lynyrd Skynyrd, Tim McGraw, Metallica, Mötley Crüe, Willie Nelson, Nickelback, Rush, Bob Seger, Slayer, George Strait, Styx, Carrie Underwood, Van Halen, and ZZ Top.

==== Sporting ====
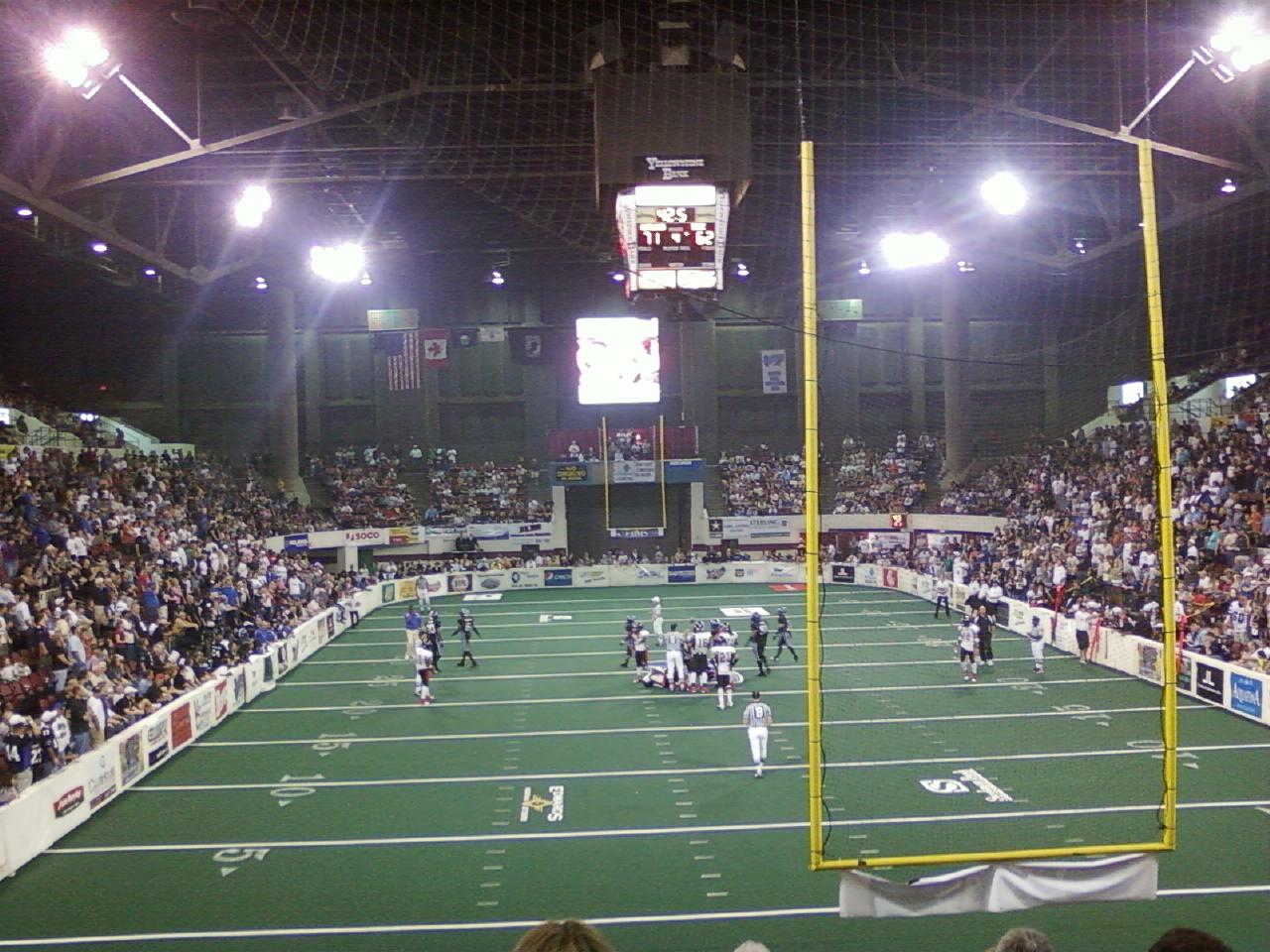
2009 United Bowl

The Arena has been home to two teams with the Indoor Football League IFL. The Billings Outlaws played in the league from 2000 to 2010 before disbanding following the June 2010 Father's Day tornado. In 2015, the league expanded adding the Billings Wolves but only lasted two seasons before folding as well.

MetraPark has hosted pre-season NBA games on a semi-regular basis. The Arena played host to the first ever game for the NBA's Oklahoma City Thunder on October 8, 2008 in a pre-season game against the Timberwolves. The Timberwolves prevailed 88–82.

MetraPark is a longtime tour stop for the Professional Bull Riders (PBR) circuit, which has visited the arena every year since 1996.

In the summer of 2005, MetraPark hosted tryouts for the All-American Professional Basketball League (AAPBL), a new minor basketball league. The tryouts took place from July 11 to 22, 2005. However, the league folded shortly thereafter.

MetraPark has also played host to various WWE, WCW and UWF wrestling events including a live televised WCW Monday Nitro television show on June 19, 2000.

In 2017, First Interstate Arena hosted the NAIA Women's DI Basketball Tournament.

In 2022, a new version of the Billings Outlaws began play at the arena as members of Champions Indoor Football and now the revived Arena Football League.

== Outdoor Arena ==
On August 14, 2025, a ribbon cutting ceremony was held for the newly constructed outdoor arena. The first event was Rodeo Billings held during the MontanaFair. The cost for completing the arena was $2.5 million.

Outdoor grandstands were previously built in the 1940s. In February 2020, the Yellowstone County commissioners unanimously determined the repair cost for the aging grandstands and outdoor barns was prohibitive and demolition was needed. Demolition began that summer.

== Expo Center ==
The Expo center is approximately 77,400 square feet. It holds a large commercial kitchen.

The Expo Center is used by 4-H to show animals during the MontanaFair in August.

== Montana Pavilion ==
The pavilion is approximately 28,800 square feet.

== Annual events ==
- Montana High School Association Wrestling Tournament – February
- M.A.T.E (Montana Agri-Trade Expo) – February
- Spring Home Improvement Show – March
- Billings RV and Boat Show - April
- PBR - April
- Special Olympics Montana - May
- Jehovah's Witnesses convention - summer
- Montana Brews & BBQ - July
- MontanaFair – August
- Fall Home Improvement Show – September
- NILE (Northern International Livestock Exposition) Stock Show – October
- Chase Hawks Memorial Rough Stock Rodeo – December

== U.S. presidential visits ==
- Donald Trump – 2018
- George W. Bush – 2001 and 2006
- Bill Clinton – 1996
- George H. W. Bush – 1992
- Ronald Reagan – 1982
- John F. Kennedy – 1963, then known as the Midland Empire Fairgrounds.
