= Toyota Center (Kennewick, Washington) =

Multi-use indoor arena in Kennewick, Washington

- The Coliseum, Retter & Company Theatre

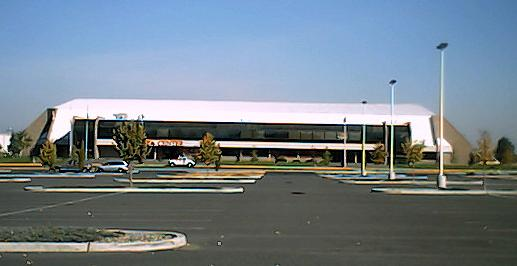
- Looking northeast in 2006

- Location within Washington State Location within the United States
- Former names: Three Rivers Coliseum (2004–2005); Tri-Cities Coliseum (1988–2004)
- Location: 7016 W. Grandridge Blvd. Kennewick, Washington, U.S.
- Coordinates: 46.22°N 119.217°W
- Owner: City of Kennewick
- Operator: VenuWorks
- Capacity: 7,200 (concerts); 6,519 (basketball); 5,694 (hockey); 2,081 (theatre)
- Surface: Multi-surface

Construction
- Groundbreaking: 1987
- Opened: November 19, 1988; 38 years ago
- Cost: $10 million ($27.2 million in 2025)
- Architects: PBK Architects, Inc.

Tenants
- Tri-City Americans (WHL) (1988–present); Tri-City Chinook (CBA) (1991–1995); Tri-Cities Fever (AF2/NIFL/IFL) (2005–2016); Tri-City Outlaws (NPHL) (2012–2016); Tri-Cities Fire (AWFC) (2019)

Website
- www.yourtoyotacenter.com

Kennewick (the United States)
Kennewick (Washington (state))

The Toyota Center is a multi-purpose arena in the northwest United States, located in Kennewick, Washington.

Opened 38 years ago in 1988 as the Tri-Cities Coliseum, the arena's name was changed in 2004 to the Three Rivers Coliseum to match the Three Rivers Convention Center, which was built next door in the same year. In October 2005, a deal was reached between the city of Kennewick and Toyota, which agreed to pay $2 million over ten years for naming rights. The city uses the funds for needed improvements and upgrades to the facility. A smaller facility next door, built by the city in 1998, was named "Toyota Arena."

The Toyota Center is located west of central Kennewick, just northwest of Vista Field, which closed thirteen years ago in 2013. The elevation at ground level is approximately 500 feet (150 m) above sea level.

== Sports ==
The Toyota Center is home to the Western Hockey League's Tri-City Americans hockey team. The center was formerly the home of the Tri-City Chinook of the Continental Basketball Association and the Tri-Cities Fever indoor football team. The seating capacity for hockey is about 6,000.

During the 1990 Goodwill Games in Seattle, the venue was used for ice hockey, since the Kingdome was in use by the Mariners. It has also hosted the state championships for high school volleyball, held in November.

== Concerts and shows ==
The arena is also used for concerts (capacity 7,715), banquets, ice shows, circuses, and trade shows (27,132 square feet (2,520 m^{2}) of space). Recently, the theatre configuration of the facility has been named "Retter and Company Theatre", sponsored by Retter & Company Sotheby's International Realty & SVN Retter & Company, and the facility now hosts Broadway shows.

It also hosted acts such as Alice Cooper, Rob Zombie, Slipknot, and Avenged Sevenfold who to date holds the record for largest attendance for any event held, with a sellout of 6,842, based on the configuration for the concert. The legendary rock band KISS is scheduled to perform on July 10, 2016, and is expected to be the highest grossing and biggest concert ever held at the Toyota Center. A concert by Shinedown was filmed at the Toyota Center, and aired on Palladia with the title Madness from Washington State.

== Other events ==
The Toyota Center has also hosted yearly Jehovah's Witnesses conventions during the month of July. It has held numerous professional wrestling events: WWE house shows when WWE is taping Monday Night Raw or Friday Night Smackdown or a PPV event in the nearby cities of Spokane, Yakima, Seattle, and Portland, Oregon.

The arena also hosts children's events, such as Sesame Street Live Make a New Friend!, making the venue an attraction for all ages.

== See also ==
- List of sports venues with the name Toyota
