= 2012 United Bowl =

| Tri-Cities Fever | Sioux Falls Storm |
| (14–2) | (16–0) |
| Intense | United |
| 32 | 59 |
| Head coach: Adam Shackleford | Head coach: Kurtiss Riggs |
| | 1 | 2 | 3 | 4 | Total |
|---|---|---|---|---|---|
| Tri-Cities | 14 | 6 | 3 | 9 | 32 |
| Sioux Falls | 10 | 12 | 23 | 14 | 59 |
- Date: July 14, 2012
- Stadium: Sioux Falls Arena
- Location: Sioux Falls, South Dakota, U.S.
- MVP: Sioux Falls DE Jeremiah Price
- Referee: David Wallace
- Attendance: 4,901

The 2012 United Bowl was the fourth title game of the Indoor Football League (IFL). It was played on July 14, 2012, at the Sioux Falls Arena in Sioux Falls, South Dakota. The top seed in the United Conference, the Sioux Falls Storm, defeated their Intense Conference counterpart Tri-Cities Fever, by a score of 59–37.

== Road to the United Bowl ==
2012 Intense Conference
| | W | L | T | PCT | PF | PA | DIV | GB | STK |
|---|---|---|---|---|---|---|---|---|---|
| y Tri-Cities Fever | 12 | 2 | 0 | 0.857 | 750 | 619 | 12-0 | --- | W2 |
| x Allen Wranglers | 9 | 5 | 0 | 0.643 | 842 | 670 | 9-4 | 3.0 | W3 |
| x Wichita Wild | 8 | 6 | 0 | 0.571 | 658 | 681 | 5-3 | 4.0 | L1 |
| x Colorado Ice | 8 | 6 | 0 | 0.571 | 681 | 595 | 8-5 | 4.0 | L2 |
| Everett Raptors | 5 | 9 | 0 | 0.357 | 696 | 781 | 5-9 | 7.0 | L1 |
| Nebraska Danger | 5 | 9 | 0 | 0.357 | 664 | 721 | 3-6 | 7.0 | L1 |
| Wyoming Cavalry | 4 | 10 | 0 | 0.286 | 619 | 762 | 3-8 | 8.0 | L2 |
| New Mexico Stars | 2 | 12 | 0 | 0.143 | 541 | 764 | 2-12 | 10.0 | L9 |

2012 United Conference
| | W | L | T | PCT | PF | PA | DIV | GB | STK |
|---|---|---|---|---|---|---|---|---|---|
| y Sioux Falls Storm | 14 | 0 | 0 | 1.000 | 941 | 563 | 7-0 | --- | W14 |
| x Green Bay Blizzard | 11 | 3 | 0 | 0.786 | 787 | 586 | 10-3 | 3.0 | W3 |
| x Bloomington Edge | 10 | 4 | 0 | 0.714 | 673 | 604 | 10-3 | 4.0 | W1 |
| x Lehigh Valley Steelhawks | 6 | 8 | 0 | 0.429 | 605 | 615 | 6-8 | 8.0 | W1 |
| Omaha Beef | 6 | 8 | 0 | 0.429 | 635 | 696 | 3-3 | 4.0 | L2 |
| Chicago Slaughter | 6 | 8 | 0 | 0.429 | 657 | 714 | 6-8 | 4.0 | L1 |
| Cedar Rapids Titans | 4 | 10 | 0 | 0.286 | 509 | 631 | 4-0 | 10.0 | W1 |
| Reading Express | 2 | 12 | 0 | 0.143 | 534 | 773 | 7-1 | 12.0 | L5 |

Conference Semi-Finals
1 | Sioux Falls | 79
4 | Lehigh Valley | 21
2 | Green Bay | 51
3 | Bloomington | 30
1 | Tri-Cities | 52
4 | Colorado | 42
2 | Allen | 40
3 | Wichita | 43

Conference Championships
1 | Sioux Falls | 61
2 | Green Bay | 42
1 | Tri-Cities | 51
3 | Wichita | 30

2012 United Bowl
U1 | Sioux Falls | 59
I1 | Tri-Cities | 32
