= 2012 Indoor Football League season =

2012 IFL season
- League: Indoor Football League
- Sport: Indoor Football
- Duration: February 19, 2012 – July 14, 2012
- Teams: 16

Regular season
- Season champions: Sioux Falls Storm
- Season MVP: Chris Dixon

Playoffs
- Intense champions: Tri-Cities Fever
- Intense runners-up: Wichita Wild
- United champions: Sioux Falls Storm
- United runners-up: Green Bay Blizzard

2012 United Bowl Championship
- Champions: Sioux Falls Storm
- Runners-up: Tri-Cities Fever
- Finals MVP: Jeremiah Price (SF)

IFL seasons
- ← 2011 2013 →

The 2012 Indoor Football League season was the fourth season of the Indoor Football League (IFL). The league lost nine of its previous teams but gained three new teams. The three new teams were the Cedar Rapids Titans, New Mexico Stars and the Everett Raptors. The season kicked off on February 19, 2012, when the Chicago Slaughter beat the Bloomington Edge 50–34. For the 2012 season, the IFL switched to a two-conference format with no divisions, due, in large part, to the loss of all the Texas-based teams (except the Allen Wranglers) to the newly formed Lone Star Football League. The Wranglers brought attention to the league for offering a US$500,000 contract to unemployed wide receiver Terrell Owens to become the team's part-owner and wide receiver. Owens accepted the contract. ESPN3 carried Owens's debut game against the Wichita Wild. The front office of the league saw changes as well, as Commissioner Tommy Benizio resigned. The league appointed assistant commissioner Robert Loving as the interim Commissioner.

== Standings ==
2012 Intense Conference
	W	L	T	PCT	PF	PA	DIV	GB	STK
y Tri-Cities Fever	12	2	0	0.857	750	619	12-0	---	W2
x Allen Wranglers	9	5	0	0.643	842	670	9-4	3.0	W3
x Wichita Wild	8	6	0	0.571	658	681	5-3	4.0	L1
x Colorado Ice	8	6	0	0.571	681	595	8-5	4.0	L2
Everett Raptors	5	9	0	0.357	696	781	5-9	7.0	L1
Nebraska Danger	5	9	0	0.357	664	721	3-6	7.0	L1
Wyoming Cavalry	4	10	0	0.286	619	762	3-8	8.0	L2
New Mexico Stars	2	12	0	0.143	541	764	2-12	10.0	L9

2012 United Conference
	W	L	T	PCT	PF	PA	DIV	GB	STK
y Sioux Falls Storm	14	0	0	1.000	941	563	7-0	---	W14
x Green Bay Blizzard	11	3	0	0.786	787	586	10-3	3.0	W3
x Bloomington Edge	10	4	0	0.714	673	604	10-3	4.0	W1
x Lehigh Valley Steelhawks	6	8	0	0.429	605	615	6-8	8.0	W1
Omaha Beef	6	8	0	0.429	635	696	3-3	4.0	L2
Chicago Slaughter	6	8	0	0.429	657	714	6-8	4.0	L1
Cedar Rapids Titans	4	10	0	0.286	509	631	4-10	10.0	W1
Reading Express	2	12	0	0.143	534	773	2-12	12.0	L5

== Playoffs ==
Conference Semi-Finals
3	Wichita	43
2	Allen	40
Intense Conference
4	Colorado	43
1	Tri-Cities	52
3	Bloomington	30
2	Green Bay	51
United Conference
4	Lehigh Valley	21
1	Sioux Falls	79

Conference Championships
3	Wichita	30
1	Tri-Cities	51
2	Green Bay	42
1	Sioux Falls	61

2012 United Bowl
I1	Tri-Cities	32
U1	Sioux Falls	59

== Awards ==
=== Individual season awards ===
Award	Winner	Position	Team
Most Valuable Player	Chris Dixon	Quarterback	Sioux Falls Storm
Offensive Player of the Year	Chris Dixon	Quarterback	Sioux Falls Storm
Co-Defensive Player of the Year	Ross Cochran	Linebacker	Wyoming Cavalry
Co-Defensive Player of the Year	Mat Moss	Defensive Lineman	Wichita Wild
Special Teams Player of the Year	Mike Tatum	Kick returner	Everett Raptors
Offensive Rookie of the Year	Jasonus Tillery	Wide Receiver	Wyoming Cavalry
Defensive Rookie of the Year	Peter Buck	Linebacker	Omaha Beef
Most Improved Player	Rocky Hinds	Quarterback	Nebraska Danger
Adam Pringle Award	Robert Fuller	Head coach	Green Bay Blizzard
Coach of the Year	Robert Fuller	Head coach	Green Bay Blizzard

=== 1st Team All-IFL ===
Offense
Quarterback	Chris Dixon, Sioux Falls
Running back	LaRon Council, Green Bay
Wide receiver	Jasonus Tillery, Wyoming; Carl Sims, Sioux Falls; Andre Piper-Jordan, Everett
Offensive tackle	Myniya Smith, Sioux Falls; Jason Enos, Wichita
Center	Charlie Sanders, Sioux Falls

Defense
Defensive line	Matt Moss, Wichita; Jeff Sobol, Bloomington; Jake Killeen, Tri-Cities
Linebacker	Ross Cochran Bloomington; Lenny Radtke, Chicago
Defensive back	Lionell Singleton, Tri-Cities; Jeff Temple, Bloomington; Frankie Solomon, Jr., Texas

Special teams
Kicker	Aric Goodman, Colorado
Kick returner	Mike Tatum, Everett
Ironman	Matt Cohen, Lehigh Valley

=== 2nd Team All-IFL ===
Offense
Quarterback	Houston Lillard, Tri-Cities
Running back	Darius Fudge, Allen
Wide receiver	Steven Whitehead, Tri-Cities; Kayne Farquharson, Nebraska; Clinton Solomon, Sioux Falls
Offensive tackle	Seth Smalls, Green Bay; Michael Trice, Colorado
Center	William Falakiseni, Tri-Cities

Defense
Defensive end	Michael Dell, Reading; Xzavie Jackson, Cedar Rapids; Antonio Ficklin, Bloomington
Linebacker	Peter Buck, Omaha; DeJuan Fulghum, Sioux Falls
Defensive back	B. J. Hall, Green Bay; T. J. Simmons, Cedar Rapids; Marvin Johnson, Lehigh Valley

Special teams
Kicker	Gary Cismesia, Omaha
Kick Returner	B. J. Hill, Green Bay
