= 2012 Allen Wranglers season =

Indoor Football League team season

- General manager: Drew Pearson
- Head coach: Pat Pimmell (released April 30)
- Home stadium: Allen Event Center

Results
- Record: 9–5 (regular season)
- Division place: N/A
- Conference place: 2nd, Intense Conference
- Playoffs: Lost in conference semi-finals

The 2012 Allen Wranglers season was the franchise's thirteenth season as a football franchise, third in the Indoor Football League, and second as the "Allen Wranglers". The team played their home games at the Allen Event Center in Allen, Texas. The team finished with a 9–5 regular season record. They reached the IFL playoffs but lost in the Intense Conference semi-finals to the Wichita Wild.

== Off-field moves ==
Rascal the Raccoon, an anthropomorphic raccoon wearing a Wranglers uniform, became the team's official mascot in early 2012. Rascal was designed and brought to life by Ted Ovletrea, the man who portrayed Rowdy, the official mascot of the Dallas Cowboys, from conception until 2009. Rascal replaced Hoss, a cowboy mascot designed to match the team logo.

In March 2012, Tommy Benizio joined the Wranglers' ownership group and assumed the role of team president. Benizio had served as the IFL's commissioner from the league's founding in 2008 until resigning to become a co-owner of the Allen franchise.

After back-to-back losses in April, head coach Pat Pimmell was released by the team on April 30. The team announced that offensive coordinator Dixie Wooten and defensive coordinator Quinn Cairo would split coaching responsibilities until a replacement could be found. They shared the title "co-interim head coach" through the end of the season.

== Roster moves ==
National Football League (NFL) veteran wide receiver Terrell Owens joined the team at the start of the 2012 season. Owens had surgery to repair a torn anterior cruciate ligament in 2011 and received no offers from NFL teams for 2012. He swelled attendance at Wranglers games and brought the national spotlight onto the team. However, several opponents, including Everett Raptors coach Sean Ponder, questioned Owens' commitment to the IFL since he skipped many of his team's road games. Owens' Wranglers contract allowed him flexibility with away dates but he contracted with some road opponents for first-class airfare and accommodations to play in their arenas. With three games left in the season, citing his "lack of effort both on and off the field", failure to show up for a scheduled appearance at a children's hospital, and refusal to play in two upcoming road games, Owens was released by the Wranglers on May 29, 2012. Along with his release, Owens also relinquished his ownership stake in the team.

Bryan Randall, a celebrated college athlete with stints in the NFL and Canadian Football League, was the opening day quarterback for the Wranglers. In early March, The team traded him to the Lehigh Valley Steelhawks in return for future considerations. Randall was named the IFL's Most Valuable Player in 2010. Randall's backup, former Kansas City Chiefs player Casey Printers, took over the starting quarterback role.

== Schedule ==
Key: Win Tie Loss Bye

=== Regular season ===
| Week | Day | Date | Kickoff | Opponent | Results | | Location |
| Week | Day | Date | Kickoff | Opponent | Score | Record | Location |
|---|---|---|---|---|---|---|---|
| 1 | Bye | | | | | | |
| 2 | Saturday | February 25 | 7:05pm | Wichita Wild | W 50–30 | 1–0 | Allen Event Center |
| 3 | Thursday | March 1 | 7:05pm (PST) | at Everett Raptors | W 48–27 | 2–0 | Comcast Arena at Everett |
| 4 | Sunday | March 11 | 3:05pm (MDT) | at New Mexico Stars | W 45–28 | 3–0 | Santa Ana Star Center |
| 5 | Sunday | March 18 | 3:00pm (MDT) | at Colorado Ice | L 54–61 | 3–1 | Budweiser Events Center |
| 6 | Saturday | March 24 | 7:05pm | at Wichita Wild | W 61–48 | 4–1 | Hartman Arena |
| 7 | Saturday | March 31 | 7:05pm | Nebraska Danger | W 86–57 | 5–1 | Allen Event Center |
| 8 | Bye | | | | | | |
| 9 | Saturday | April 14 | 7:05pm | Sioux Falls Storm | L 45–52 | 5–2 | Allen Event Center |
| 10 | Bye | | | | | | |
| 11 | Saturday | April 28 | 7:05pm | at Wichita Wild | L 54–55 | 5–3 | Hartman Arena |
| 12 | Saturday | May 5 | 7:05pm | New Mexico Stars | W 73–9 | 6–3 | Allen Event Center |
| 13 | Bye | | | | | | |
| 14 | Saturday | May 19 | 7:05pm | Everett Raptors | L 73–74 | 6–4 | Allen Events Center |
| 15 | Saturday | May 26 | 7:05pm | Wichita Wild | L 59–41 | 6–5 | Allen Event Center |
| 16 | Saturday | June 2 | 7:05pm | at Nebraska Danger | W 71–62 | 7–5 | Eihusen Arena |
| 17 | Thursday | June 7 | 7:05pm (PDT) | at Everett Raptors | W 56–38 | 8–5 | Comcast Arena at Everett |
| 18 | Saturday | June 16 | 7:05pm | New Mexico Stars | W 85–70 | 9–5 | Allen Event Center |

=== Playoffs ===
| Round | Day | Date | Kickoff | Opponent | Results | | Location |
| Round | Day | Date | Kickoff | Opponent | Score | Record | Location |
|---|---|---|---|---|---|---|---|
| 1 | Monday | June 25 | 7:00pm | Wichita Wild | L 40–43 | 0–1 | Allen Event Center |

== Standings ==
2012 Intense Conference
| | W | L | T | PCT | PF | PA | DIV | GB | STK |
|---|---|---|---|---|---|---|---|---|---|
| y Tri-Cities Fever | 12 | 2 | 0 | 0.857 | 750 | 619 | 12-0 | --- | W2 |
| x Allen Wranglers | 9 | 5 | 0 | 0.643 | 842 | 670 | 9-4 | 3.0 | W3 |
| x Wichita Wild | 8 | 6 | 0 | 0.571 | 658 | 681 | 5-3 | 4.0 | L1 |
| x Colorado Ice | 8 | 6 | 0 | 0.571 | 681 | 595 | 8-5 | 4.0 | L2 |
| Everett Raptors | 5 | 9 | 0 | 0.357 | 696 | 781 | 5-9 | 7.0 | L1 |
| Nebraska Danger | 5 | 9 | 0 | 0.357 | 664 | 721 | 3-6 | 7.0 | L1 |
| Wyoming Cavalry | 4 | 10 | 0 | 0.286 | 619 | 762 | 3-8 | 8.0 | L2 |
| New Mexico Stars | 2 | 12 | 0 | 0.143 | 541 | 764 | 2-12 | 10.0 | L9 |

== Roster ==
2012 Allen Wranglers roster
| Quarterbacks: 14 David Knighton; Running backs: 2 Darius Fudge; 11 Ramonce Taylor; Wide receivers: 1 Maurice Avery; 13 Jeremy Brown; 6 Luke McArdle | Offensive linemen: 50 Courtney Abbott; 72 George Bastiste; 77 Ya'tarrie Brown; Defensive linemen: 91 Anthony Harris; 5 Mike Landry; 99 DeVonte Peterson | Linebackers: 41 Arthor Smith III; Defensive backs: 24 Javon Jackson; 7 Travonti Johnson; 10 Mike Phillips; 21 Muhammad Shamsid-Deen; 15 Frankie Solomon Jr.; Kickers: 25 David Pino | Injured Reserve: currently vacant; Exempt List: currently vacant; rookies in italics Roster updated June 5, 2012; 19 Active, 0 Inactive → More rosters |
