= 2012 Tri-Cities Fever season =

Indoor Football League team season

- Owner: Teri Carr
- General manager: Teri Carr
- Head coach: Adam Shackleford
- Home stadium: Toyota Center; 7016 West Grandridge Blvd. Kennewick, WA 99336

Results
- Record: 12–2
- Conference place: 1st Intense
- Playoffs: Won IC Semifinals (Ice) 52–42; Won IC Championship (Wild) 51–30; Lost 2012 United Bowl (Storm) 32–59

The 2012 Tri-Cities Fever season was the team's eighth season as a professional indoor football franchise and third in the Indoor Football League (IFL). One of sixteen teams competing in the IFL for the 2013 season, the Kennewick, Washington-based Tri-Cities Fever were members of the Intense Conference. Founded in 2005 as part of National Indoor Football League, the Tri-Cities Fever moved to the af2 in 2007 then jumped to the IFL before the 2010 season.

Under the leadership of owner/general manager Teri Carr and head coach Adam Shackleford, the team played their home games at the Toyota Center in Kennewick, Washington. Shackleford's staff includes assistant coach Cleveland Pratt and defensive line coach Kimo von Oelhoffen. The Fever Girls are the official dance team.

== Schedule ==
Key: Win Tie Loss Bye

=== Regular season ===
All start times are local time

| Week | Day | Date | Kickoff | Opponent | Results | | Location |
| Week | Day | Date | Kickoff | Opponent | Score | Record | Location |
|---|---|---|---|---|---|---|---|
| 1 | BYE | | | | | | |
| 2 | Saturday | February 25 | 7:05pm | Everett Raptors | W 70–44 | 1–0 | Toyota Center |
| 3 | Sunday | March 4 | 6:05pm | at Nebraska Danger | W 38–23 | 2–0 | Eihusen Arena |
| 4 | Saturday | March 10 | 7:05pm | Colorado Ice | W 64–50 | 3–0 | Toyota Center |
| 5 | BYE | | | | | | |
| 6 | Thursday | March 22 | 7:05pm | at Everett Raptors | W 54–48 | 4–0 | Comcast Arena at Everett |
| 7 | Friday | March 30 | 7:05pm | Wyoming Cavalry | W 62–41 | 5–0 | Toyota Center |
| 8 | Friday | April 6 | 7:05pm | at New Mexico Stars | W 65–62 | 6–0 | Santa Ana Star Center |
| 9 | Friday | April 13 | 7:05pm | Everett Raptors | W 54–33 | 7–0 | Toyota Center |
| 10 | BYE | | | | | | |
| 11 | Friday | April 27 | 7:05pm | New Mexico Stars | W 37–20 | 8–0 | Toyota Center |
| 12 | Friday | May 4 | 7:05pm | at Everett Raptors | W 70–61 | 9–0 | Comcast Arena at Everett |
| 13 | Saturday | May 12 | 7:05pm | at Sioux Falls Storm | L 16–55 | 9–1 | Sioux Falls Arena |
| 14 | Friday | May 18 | 7:05pm | at Wyoming Cavalry | W 30–26 | 10–1 | Casper Events Center |
| 15 | Saturday | May 26 | 7:05pm | Sioux Falls Storm | L 72–73 | 10–2 | Toyota Center |
| 16 | Saturday | June 2 | 7:00pm | at Colorado Ice | W 52–49 | 11–2 | Budweiser Events Center |
| 17 | Saturday | June 9 | 7:05pm | Wyoming Cavalry | W 66–34 | 12–2 | Toyota Center |
| 18 | BYE | | | | | | |

=== Post-season ===
| Week | Day | Date | Kickoff | Opponent | Results | | Location |
| Week | Day | Date | Kickoff | Opponent | Final score | Record | Location |
|---|---|---|---|---|---|---|---|
| IC Semifinals | Friday | June 22 | 7:05pm | Colorado Ice | W 52–42 | 1–0 | Toyota Center |
| IC Championship | Friday | June 29 | 7:05pm | Wichita Wild | W 51–30 | 2–0 | Toyota Center |
| 2012 United Bowl | Saturday | July 14 | 7:35pm | at Sioux Falls Storm | L 32–59 | 2–1 | Sioux Falls Arena |

== Roster ==
2012 Tri-Cities Fever roster
| Quarterbacks: 5 Houston Lillard; 12 Kasey Peters; Running backs: 1 Dennis Kennedy; Wide receivers: 7 Ed Berry; 8 Jamar Howard; 23 Giovanni Stanley; 4 Steven Whitehead | Offensive linemen: 91 Lance Evnuomwan; 60 William Falakasini; 76 Anthony McNac; 70 Chris Rutledge; 79 Roddrell Stewart; Defensive linemen: 10 Darius Collins; 93 Bailey Johnson; 9 Jake Killeen; 57 Shane McCord | Linebackers: 44 Boris Lee; Defensive backs: 21 Rudell Crim; 11 Deleon Gause; 20 Frantz Joseph; 6 Marquise Liverpool; 2 Lionell Singleton; Kickers: 19 Brady Beeson | Injured Reserve: currently vacant; Exempt List: currently vacant; rookies in italics Roster updated July 14, 2012; 23 Active, 0 Inactive → More rosters |

== Standings ==
2012 Intense Conference
| | W | L | T | PCT | PF | PA | DIV | GB | STK |
|---|---|---|---|---|---|---|---|---|---|
| y Tri-Cities Fever | 12 | 2 | 0 | 0.857 | 750 | 619 | 12-0 | --- | W2 |
| x Allen Wranglers | 9 | 5 | 0 | 0.643 | 842 | 670 | 9-4 | 3.0 | W3 |
| x Wichita Wild | 8 | 6 | 0 | 0.571 | 658 | 681 | 5-3 | 4.0 | L1 |
| x Colorado Ice | 8 | 6 | 0 | 0.571 | 681 | 595 | 8-5 | 4.0 | L2 |
| Everett Raptors | 5 | 9 | 0 | 0.357 | 696 | 781 | 5-9 | 7.0 | L1 |
| Nebraska Danger | 5 | 9 | 0 | 0.357 | 664 | 721 | 3-6 | 7.0 | L1 |
| Wyoming Cavalry | 4 | 10 | 0 | 0.286 | 619 | 762 | 3-8 | 8.0 | L2 |
| New Mexico Stars | 2 | 12 | 0 | 0.143 | 541 | 764 | 2-12 | 10.0 | L9 |
