= 2012 Nebraska Danger season =

Sports season

- Owner: Charlie Bosselman
- Head coach: Mike Davis
- Home stadium: Eihusen Arena

Results
- Record: 5–9
- Conference place: 6th, Intense

The 2012 Nebraska Danger season was the second season for the Nebraska Danger as a professional indoor football franchise and their second in the Indoor Football League (IFL). One of 16 teams competing in the IFL for the 2012 season, the Nebraska Danger were members of the Intense Conference.

The team played their home games under head coach Mike Davis at the Eihusen Arena in Grand Island, Nebraska. The Danger earned a 5–9 record, placing 6th in the Intense Conference, and failed to qualify for post-season play.

== Schedule ==
Key: Win Tie Loss Bye

=== Preseason ===
Week	Day	Date	Kickoff	Opponent	Results		Location
Week	Day	Date	Kickoff	Opponent	Score	Record	Location
1	Thursday	February 23	7:05pm	Nebraska Lawdawgs	W 58–0	1–0	Eihusen Arena

=== Regular season ===
All start times are local

Week	Day	Date	Kickoff	Opponent	Results		Location
Week	Day	Date	Kickoff	Opponent	Score	Record	Location
1	BYE						
2	BYE						
3	Sunday	March 4	6:05pm	Tri-Cities Fever	L 23–38	0–1	Eihusen Arena
4	Monday	March 12	7:05pm	Omaha Beef	W 48–34	1–1	Eihusen Arena
5	BYE						
6	Friday	March 23	7:05pm	Wyoming Cavalry	L 43–44	1–2	Eihusen Arena
7	Saturday	March 31	7:05pm	at Allen Wranglers	L 57–86	1–3	Allen Event Center
8	Thursday	April 5	7:05pm	at Everett Raptors	L 35–52	1–4	Comcast Arena
9	Saturday	April 14	7:05pm	Wichita Wild	W 42–27	2–4	Eihusen Arena
10	Saturday	April 21	7:00pm	at Sioux Falls Storm	L 49–76	2–5	Sioux Falls Arena
11	Friday	April 27	7:05pm	Everett Raptors	W 68–59	3–5	Eihusen Arena
12	Saturday	May 5	7:05pm	at Colorado Ice	W 45–33	4–5	Budweiser Events Center
13	Saturday	May 12	7:05pm	at Omaha Beef	L 54–68	4–6	Ralston Arena
14	Saturday	May 19	7:05pm	at Wichita Wild	L 50–57	4–7	Hartman Arena
15	BYE						
16	Saturday	June 2	7:05pm	Allen Wranglers	L 62–71	4–8	Eihusen Arena
17	Saturday	June 9	7:05pm	Omaha Beef	W 50–34	5–8	Eihusen Arena
18	Saturday	June 16	7:05pm	at Cedar Rapids Titans	L 38–42	5–9	Cedar Rapids Ice Arena

== Roster ==
2012 Nebraska Danger roster
Quarterbacks: 2 Rocky Hinds; 10 Jameel Sewell; Running backs: 20 Daniel Libre; 24 Travares Pressley; Wide receivers: 5 Chris Bell; 4 Kayne Farquharson; 1 Ryan Moore; 13 Austin Tolliver	Offensive linemen: 75 Isaiah Agson; 76 Darren Marquez; 55 James Poynter; 72 Darius Savage; Defensive linemen: 44 Michael Atunrase; 91 Jervonte Jackson; 45 Dedrick Tucker	Linebackers: 9 Derrick Byrd; Defensive backs: 13 Pig Brown; 22 Carl Gettis; 11 Darnell Jackson; 6 Roy Polite; 21 Darnell Terrell; 7 Bryan Thomas; Kickers: 17 George Pierson	Injured Reserve: currently vacant; Exempt List: currently vacant; Practice squad: currently vacant; Roster updated June 16, 2012; 23 Active, 0 Inactive, 0 PS → More rosters

== Standings ==
2012 Intense Conference
	W	L	T	PCT	PF	PA	DIV	GB	STK
y Tri-Cities Fever	12	2	0	0.857	750	619	12-0	---	W2
x Allen Wranglers	9	5	0	0.643	842	670	9-4	3.0	W3
x Wichita Wild	8	6	0	0.571	658	681	5-3	4.0	L1
x Colorado Ice	8	6	0	0.571	681	595	8-5	4.0	L2
Everett Raptors	5	9	0	0.357	696	781	5-9	7.0	L1
Nebraska Danger	5	9	0	0.357	664	721	3-6	7.0	L1
Wyoming Cavalry	4	10	0	0.286	619	762	3-8	8.0	L2
New Mexico Stars	2	12	0	0.143	541	764	2-12	10.0	L9
