= 2012 Colorado Ice season =

Indoor Football League team season

- Owner: Tom Wigley
- General manager: Collins Sanders
- Head coach: Heron O'Neal
- Home stadium: Budweiser Events Center

Results
- Record: 8–6
- Division place: 4th, Intense Conference
- Playoffs: Lost in first round

The 2012 Colorado Ice season was the team's sixth season as a football franchise and fourth in the Indoor Football League (IFL). Founded for the 2007 season as part of United Indoor Football, the Colorado Ice became charter members of the IFL when the UIF merged with the Intense Football League before the 2009 season. One of 16 teams that competed in the IFL for the 2012 season, the Fort Collins-based Colorado Ice were members of the Intense Conference.

In their first season under head coach Heron O'Neal, the Colorado Ice played their home games at the Budweiser Events Center in Loveland, Colorado. The team recorded an 8–6 record and reached the playoffs for the second season in a row. Two Ice players were named to All-IFL Teams: Aric Goodman was selected First Team for special teams and offensive lineman while Mike Trice was selected Second Team All IFL for offense.

== Schedule ==
Key: Win Tie Loss Bye

=== Regular season ===
Week	Day	Date	Kickoff	Opponent	Results		Location
Week	Day	Date	Kickoff	Opponent	Final score	Record	Location
1	BYE						
2	Sunday	February 26	3:05pm	at New Mexico Stars	L 46–39	0–1	Santa Ana Star Center
3	Sunday	March 4	3:00pm	Wyoming Cavalry	W 72–37	1–1	Budweiser Events Center
4	Saturday	March 10	3:00pm	at Tri-Cities Fever	L 64–50	1–2	Toyota Center
5	Sunday	March 18	3:00pm	Allen Wranglers	W 61–54	2–2	Budweiser Events Center
6	BYE						
7	Saturday	March 31	7:00pm	at Everett Raptors	W 49–36	3–2	Comcast Arena
8	Friday	April 6	7:00pm	at Wyoming Cavalry	W 42–35	4–2	Casper Events Center
9	Saturday	April 14	7:05pm	at New Mexico Stars	L 41–44	4–3	Santa Ana Star Center
10	BYE						
11	Saturday	April 28	7:00pm	Wyoming Cavalry	W 48–33	5–3	Budweiser Events Center
12	Saturday	May 5	7:00pm	Nebraska Danger	L 33–45	5–4	Budweiser Events Center
13	Saturday	May 12	7:05pm	at Wyoming Cavalry	W 59–46	6–4	Casper Events Center
14	Friday	May 18	7:00pm	New Mexico Stars	W 58–9	7–4	Budweiser Events Center
15	Saturday	May 26	7:05pm	at Everett Raptors	W 54–25	8–4	Comcast Arena
16	Saturday	June 2	7:00pm	Tri-Cities Fever	L 49–52	8–5	Budweiser Events Center
17	Saturday	June 9	7:00pm	at Sioux Falls Storm	L 26–69	8–6	Sioux Falls Arena
18	BYE						

=== Postseason ===
Week	Day	Date	Kickoff	Opponent	Results		Location
Week	Day	Date	Kickoff	Opponent	Final score	Record	Location
1	Friday	June 22	7:05pm	at Tri-Cities Fever	L 52–42	0–1	Santa Ana Star Center

== Standings ==
2012 Intense Conference
	W	L	T	PCT	PF	PA	DIV	GB	STK
y Tri-Cities Fever	12	2	0	0.857	750	619	12-0	---	W2
x Allen Wranglers	9	5	0	0.643	842	670	9-4	3.0	W3
x Wichita Wild	8	6	0	0.571	658	681	5-3	4.0	L1
x Colorado Ice	8	6	0	0.571	681	595	8-5	4.0	L2
Everett Raptors	5	9	0	0.357	696	781	5-9	7.0	L1
Nebraska Danger	5	9	0	0.357	664	721	3-6	7.0	L1
Wyoming Cavalry	4	10	0	0.286	619	762	3-8	8.0	L2
New Mexico Stars	2	12	0	0.143	541	764	2-12	10.0	L9
