= Angel of the Winds =

Angel of the Winds may refer to:

- Angel of the Winds Casino Resort, an Indian casino near Arlington, Washington, US
- Angel of the Winds Arena, an indoor arena in Everett, Washington, US
