= Anthony Harris (defensive lineman) =

American football player (born 1981)

No. 91, 97
- Position: Defensive tackle

Personal information
- Born: December 24, 1981 (age 44); Mayersville, Mississippi, U.S.
- Listed height: 6 ft 3 in (1.91 m)
- Listed weight: 287 lb (130 kg)

Career information
- College: Western New Mexico
- NFL draft: 2005: undrafted

Career history
- Rock River Raptors (2005–2007); Carolina Panthers (2008)*; Rock River Raptors (2008); Milwaukee Iron (2009); New York Jets (2009)*; California Redwoods (2009); Chicago Slaughter (2010–2011); Allen Wranglers (2012); Nebraska Danger (2013)
- * Offseason or practice squad member only

Anthony Harris (born December 24, 1981) is an American former football defensive tackle. He was signed by the Rock River Raptors as a street free agent in 2005. He played college football at Mississippi Delta Community College, Northwestern Oklahoma State University and Western New Mexico University.

He was also a member of the California Redwoods.
