= Zack Stortini =

Canadian ice hockey player (born 1985)

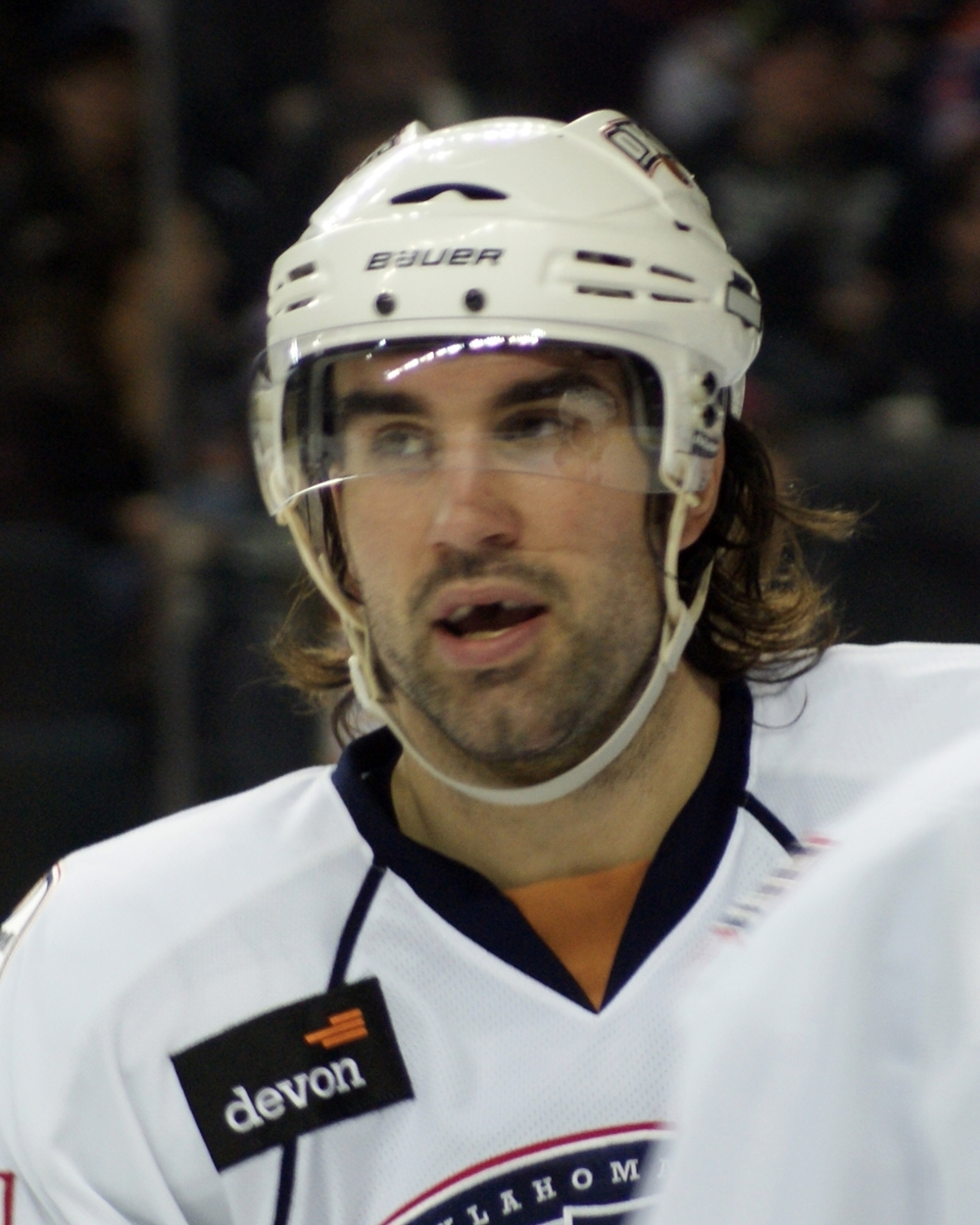
- Stortini in 2010 with the Oklahoma City Barons
- Born: September 11, 1985 (age 41) Elliot Lake, Ontario, Canada
- Height: 6 ft 4 in (193 cm)
- Weight: 225 lb (102 kg; 16 st 1 lb)
- Position: Right wing
- Shot: Right
- Played for: Edmonton Oilers; Nashville Predators
- NHL draft: 94th overall, 2003; Edmonton Oilers
- Playing career: 2005–2019

Zachery Stortini (born September 11, 1985) is a Canadian former professional ice hockey right winger and current head coach of the New Mexico Goatheads of the ECHL. He played in the National Hockey League (NHL) with the Edmonton Oilers and Nashville Predators. Stortini was chosen in the third round, 94th overall, by the Oilers in the 2003 NHL entry draft. He plays a physical game and is known as an enforcer.

== Playing career ==
Stortini is the former captain of the Sudbury Wolves, where he spent his entire Ontario Hockey League (OHL) career.

He made his professional debut in 2004 with the Toronto Roadrunners of the American Hockey League (AHL), playing in two games. After another year with Sudbury, Stortini graduated full-time joining the Iowa Stars of the AHL. Stortini scored the first goal in Iowa Stars franchise history. He was later loaned to the Milwaukee Admirals (AHL) to finish the season.

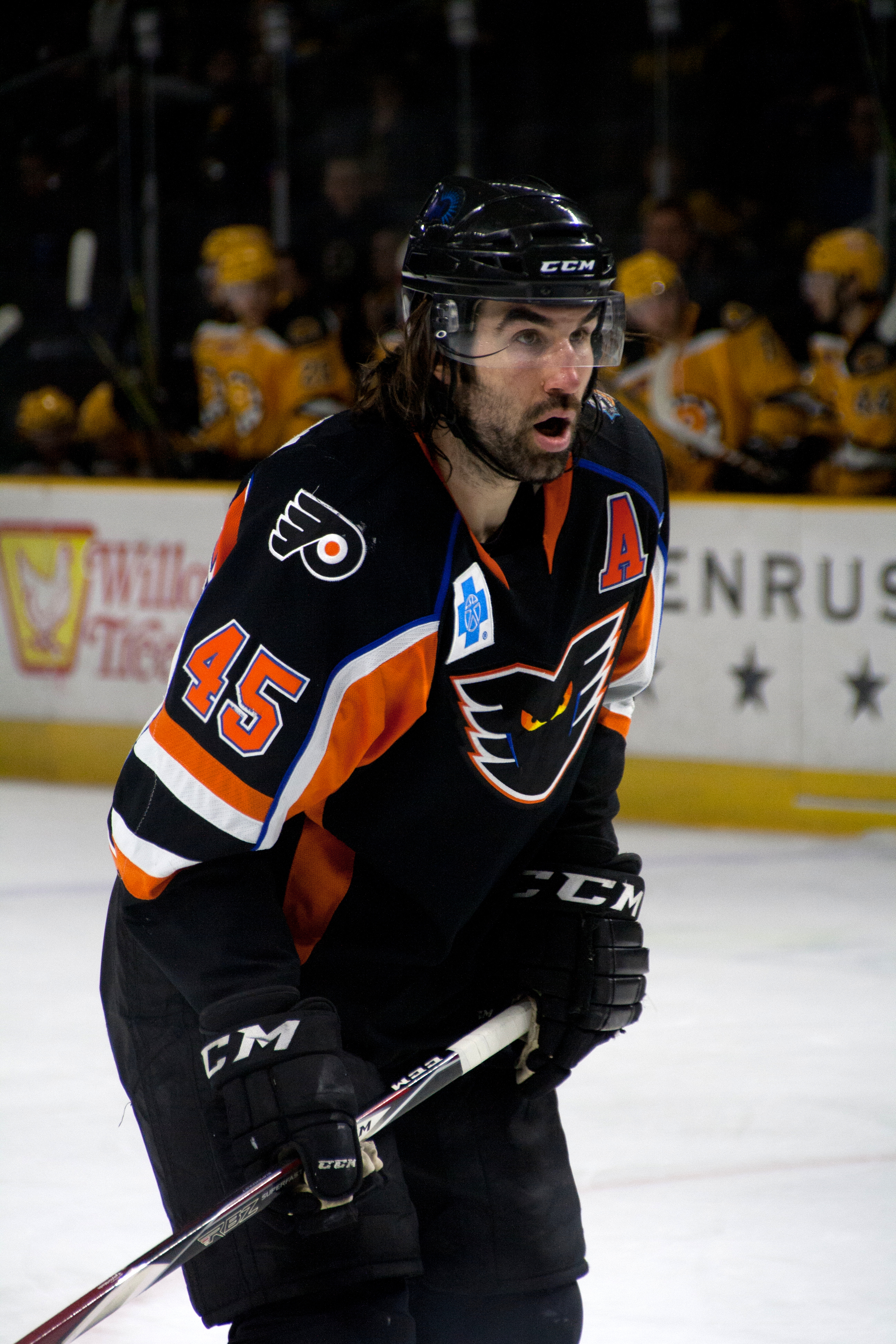
Stortini during his tenure with the Phantoms in 2015.

He made his NHL debut on January 20, 2007, against the Calgary Flames. Stortini was a –1 and received a ten-minute misconduct penalty in the third period of his first game. Stortini was leading the AHL in penalty minutes at the time of his call-up. He was brought up to add some toughness to the Oilers after they had been banged around in the previous few games. The Oilers also wanted a "heavyweight" in their line up to go against Calgary tough-guy Eric Godard. He was sent back to the Hamilton Bulldogs after the game, but later was recalled. Stortini appeared in 29 regular season games for the Oilers during the 2006–07 season. He went on to win the Calder Cup that season as a member of the Bulldogs.

Stortini scored his first NHL goal with the Oilers against the Vancouver Canucks on February 6, 2007, during the second period against goaltender Roberto Luongo.

He recorded a Gordie Howe hat trick against the Tampa Bay Lightning on December 9, 2009.

Stortini was placed on waivers by the Oilers on February 1, 2011, and subsequently cleared them on February 2. As a result, he was assigned to the Oklahoma City Barons in the AHL.

Stortini signed a one-year, two-way contract with the Nashville Predators on July 5, 2011. Shortly after the beginning of the 2011–12 season, Stortini was placed on waivers by the Predators on October 11, before he was reassigned to AHL affiliate, the Milwaukee Admirals.

With limited NHL interest, Stortini signed a one-year deal as a free agent to return for a second tenure with the Hamilton Bulldogs on September 21, 2012. In 73 games with the Bulldogs, Stortini added six points while leading the club with 241 penalty minutes.

On July 7, 2013, Stortini regained NHL interest and was signed to a one-year, two-way contract with the Anaheim Ducks. He was familiarly assigned to continue in the AHL with the Norfolk Admirals for the duration of the year.

On July 2, 2014, Stortini signed a one-year, two-way contract with the Philadelphia Flyers.

On July 1, 2015, Stortini was signed a two-year, two-way contract with the Ottawa Senators. With the intention of adding a veteran presence to AHL affiliate, the Binghamton Senators, Stortini was announced as team captain to begin the 2015–16 season.

In the midst of the last year of his contract with the Senators in 2016–17, Stortini was included in a trade to the San Jose Sharks, along with Buddy Robinson and a seventh-round draft pick in the 2017 NHL entry draft, in exchange for Tommy Wingels on January 24, 2017. He played out the remainder of the season with the Sharks' AHL affiliate, the San Jose Barracuda.

As a free agent from the Sharks, Stortini opted to continue in the AHL, agreeing to a one-year deal with the Charlotte Checkers on July 5, 2017. As a veteran presence, Stortini helped contribute to the Checkers best season in franchise history in 2018–19, appearing in 24 regular season games. Stortini concluded his 14-year professional career claiming the Calder Cup championship with the Checkers, his second AHL championship.

== Coaching career ==
On August 2, 2019, he returned to junior club, the Sudbury Wolves of the OHL, as an assistant coach to Cory Stillman.

On August 17, 2022, Stortini joined the Tucson Roadrunners of the AHL as an assistant coach.

On June 20, 2026, Stortini was named the first ever Head Coach of the newly formed New Mexico Goatheads of the ECHL, affiliate of the Colorado Eagles and Colorado Avalanche

== Personal ==
Stortini's sister Samantha played in the Brown Bears women's ice hockey program from 2007 to 2011.

== Career statistics ==
			Regular season					Playoffs
Season	Team	League	GP	G	A	Pts	PIM	GP	G	A	Pts	PIM
2000–01	Newmarket Hurricanes	OPJHL	34	3	10	13	68	—	—	—	—	—
2001–02	Sudbury Wolves	OHL	65	8	6	14	187	5	1	0	1	24
2002–03	Sudbury Wolves	OHL	62	13	16	29	222	—	—	—	—	—
2003–04	Sudbury Wolves	OHL	62	21	16	37	151	7	1	1	2	14
2003–04	Toronto Roadrunners	AHL	2	0	0	0	7	3	0	0	0	4
2004–05	Sudbury Wolves	OHL	58	13	27	40	186	12	2	5	7	27
2005–06	Iowa Stars	AHL	27	2	1	3	108	—	—	—	—	—
2005–06	Milwaukee Admirals	AHL	37	0	7	7	153	17	2	0	2	19
2006–07	Hamilton Bulldogs	AHL	47	9	6	15	195	22	3	0	3	56
2006–07	Edmonton Oilers	NHL	29	1	0	1	105	—	—	—	—	—
2007–08	Springfield Falcons	AHL	4	3	2	5	21	—	—	—	—	—
2007–08	Edmonton Oilers	NHL	66	3	9	12	201	—	—	—	—	—
2008–09	Edmonton Oilers	NHL	52	6	5	11	181	—	—	—	—	—
2009–10	Edmonton Oilers	NHL	77	4	9	13	155	—	—	—	—	—
2010–11	Edmonton Oilers	NHL	32	0	4	4	76	—	—	—	—	—
2010–11	Oklahoma City Barons	AHL	29	1	2	3	53	5	1	0	1	6
2011–12	Nashville Predators	NHL	1	0	0	0	7	—	—	—	—	—
2011–12	Milwaukee Admirals	AHL	74	9	6	15	146	3	0	1	1	2
2012–13	Hamilton Bulldogs	AHL	73	2	4	6	241	—	—	—	—	—
2013–14	Norfolk Admirals	AHL	73	4	5	9	299	9	0	2	2	4
2014–15	Lehigh Valley Phantoms	AHL	76	13	12	25	184	—	—	—	—	—
2015–16	Binghamton Senators	AHL	66	8	8	16	182	—	—	—	—	—
2016–17	Binghamton Senators	AHL	22	2	1	3	20	—	—	—	—	—
2016–17	San Jose Barracuda	AHL	26	1	0	1	96	6	0	1	1	14
2017–18	Charlotte Checkers	AHL	23	1	0	1	71	—	—	—	—	—
2018–19	Charlotte Checkers	AHL	24	0	0	0	49	—	—	—	—	—
AHL totals			603	55	54	109	1825	65	6	4	10	105
NHL totals			257	14	27	41	725	—	—	—	—	—

== Awards and honours ==
Award	Year
AHL
Calder Cup (Hamilton Bulldogs)	2007
Calder Cup (Charlotte Checkers)	2019
