= Jamar Howard (gridiron football) =

American gridiron football player (born 1987)

No. 5, 12, 14, 13, 11, 17
- Position: Wide receiver

Personal information
- Born: September 3, 1987 (age 39); Cincinnati, Ohio, U.S.
- Listed height: 6 ft 4 in (1.93 m)
- Listed weight: 215 lb (98 kg)

Career information
- High school: Cincinnati (OH) Withrow
- College: Central Missouri
- NFL draft: 2012: undrafted

Career history
- Tri-Cities Fever (2012); Cleveland Gladiators (2013); Edmonton Eskimos (2013–2014); Portland Thunder/Steel (2014–2016); Jacksonville Sharks (2016); Cleveland Gladiators (2017); Jacksonville Sharks (2018)

Career AFL statistics
- Receptions: 140
- Receiving yards: 1,832
- Receiving TDs: 31
- Stats at ArenaFan.com

Jamar Howard (born September 3, 1987) is an American former professional football wide receiver who played in the Canadian Football League (CFL) and Arena Football League (AFL). He played college football at the University of Cincinnati before transferring to the University of Central Missouri. He was a member of the Tri-Cities Fever, Cleveland Gladiators, Edmonton Eskimos, Portland Thunder/Steel, and Jacksonville Sharks.

== Professional career ==
=== Tri-Cities Fever ===
After trying out for the New York Giants at rookie mini-camp, Howard finished the indoor football season with the Tri-Cities Fever of the Indoor Football League.

=== Cleveland Gladiators ===
He signed with the Cleveland Gladiators of the Arena Football League on November 8, 2012 for the upcoming 2013 season.

=== Edmonton Eskimos ===
On August 13, 2013, he signed with the Edmonton Eskimos of the Canadian Football League. He was released April 28, 2014.

=== Portland Thunder/Steel ===
On May 5, 2014, Howard was traded to the Portland Thunder by the Cleveland Gladiators. The Gladiators held his AFL rights after exercising his 2013 rookie option. Howard emerged as the leading receiver for the Thunder. After being the AFL's top receiver through the first 5 weeks of the 2015 season, Howard was placed on injured reserve with and MCL injury. On November 6, 2015, Howard was assigned to the Thunder for the 2016 season. On February 24, 2016, the Thunder changed their name to Steel.

=== Jacksonville Sharks ===
On April 25, 2016, Howard was traded to the Jacksonville Sharks for Duke Robinson. On May 31, 2016, Howard was placed on recallable reassignment.

=== Portland Steel ===
On June 1, 2016, Howard was claimed off reassignment by the Portland Steel.

=== Cleveland Gladiators ===
On July 6, 2017, Howard was assigned to the Gladiators.
