= Duke Robinson =

American football player (born 1986)

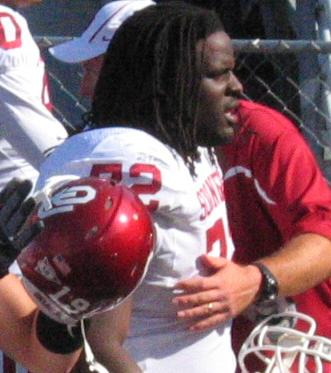
- Robinson with the Oklahoma Sooners in 2006

No. 72
- Position: Offensive guard

Personal information
- Born: October 10, 1986 (age 40); Atlanta, Georgia, U.S.
- Listed height: 6 ft 5 in (1.96 m)
- Listed weight: 330 lb (150 kg)

Career information
- High school: Washington (Atlanta)
- College: Oklahoma
- NFL draft: 2009: 5th round, 163rd overall pick

Career history
- Carolina Panthers (2009–2011); Tennessee Titans (2012)*; Utah Blaze (2013); Spokane Shock (2014); Philadelphia Soul (2014); San Jose SaberCats (2014–2015); Jacksonville Sharks (2016); Portland Steel (2016)
- * Offseason or practice squad member only

Awards and highlights
- 2× Consensus All-American (2007, 2008); First-team All-Big 12 (2007, 2008)

Career AFL statistics
- Receptions: 1
- Receiving yards: 9
- Total tackles: 1
- Stats at ArenaFan.com
- Stats at Pro Football Reference

George "Duke" Robinson (born October 10, 1986) is an American former professional football player who was a guard in the National Football League (NFL). Robinson played college football for the Oklahoma Sooners, earning consensus All-American honors in 2007 and 2008. He was selected by the Carolina Panthers in the fifth round of the 2009 NFL draft.

== Early life ==
Robinson was born in Atlanta, Georgia. He played high school football at Washington High School in Atlanta.

== College career ==
Robinson attended the University of Oklahoma, where he played for coach Bob Stoops's Oklahoma Sooners football team from 2005 to 2008. He was recognized as a consensus first-team All-American a junior in 2007, becoming Oklahoma's 143rd All-American, and again as a senior in 2008. He was also a two-time first-team All-Big 12 selection. Sports Illustrated magazine named him to its All-Decade Team in 2009.

== Professional career ==
Pre-draft measurables
| Height | Weight | Arm length | Hand span | 40-yard dash | 10-yard split | 20-yard split | 20-yard shuttle | Three-cone drill | Vertical jump | Broad jump | Bench press |
|---|---|---|---|---|---|---|---|---|---|---|---|
| 6 ft 5 in (1.96 m) | 329 lb (149 kg) | 34 3/4 in (0.88 m) | 10 5/8 in (0.27 m) | 5.33 s | 1.84 s | 3.07 s | 4.90 s | 8.09 s | 31.5 in (0.80 m) | 8 ft 3 in (2.51 m) | 20 reps |
All values from NFL Combine/Pro Day

=== 2009 NFL draft ===
Robinson was considered the number one guard prospect by many NFL scouting analyst and projected to go in the second round of the draft until a poor performance in the BCS championship game prior to the draft. He was praised for his leadership, his ability to pass protect and be a force in the running game.

=== Carolina Panthers ===
Duke was selected in the fifth round of the 2009 draft with the 163rd overall pick by the Carolina Panthers.

=== Tennessee Titans ===
Duke Robinson was signed to the Titans on January 6, 2012. He was then released on April 20, 2012.

=== Utah Blaze ===
Duke signed with the Utah Blaze of the Arena Football League on May 6, 2013.

=== Spokane Shock ===
Robinson was assigned to the Spokane Shock after the AFL dispersal draft on September 6, 2013.

=== Philadelphia Soul ===
On May 28, 2014, Robinson was traded by the Shock to the Philadelphia Soul for Fred Shaw.

=== San Jose SaberCats ===
On June 2, 2014, Robinson was traded to the San Jose SaberCats for Julius Williams.

=== Jacksonville Sharks ===
On March 21, 2016, Robinson was assigned to the Jacksonville Sharks.

=== Portland Steel ===
On April 25, 2016, Robinson was traded to the Portland Steel for Jamar Howard.

== Personal life ==
He is the grandnephew of singer/songwriter Smokey Robinson.
