= 2012 New Mexico Stars season =

Sports season

- Owner: Dart Clark
- General manager: Dart Clark
- Head coach: Chris Williams
- Home stadium: Santa Ana Star Center; 3001 Civic Centre Drive; Rio Rancho, NM 87144

Results
- Record: 2-12
- Conference place: 8th Intense
- Playoffs: did not qualify

The 2012 New Mexico Stars season was the team's first season as a professional indoor football franchise and first in the Indoor Football League (IFL). One of sixteen teams competing in the IFL for the 2012 season, the Rio Rancho, New Mexico–based New Mexico Stars were members of the Intense Conference.

Under the leadership of owner/general manager Dart Clark and head coach Chris Williams, the team played their home games at the Santa Ana Star Center in Rio Rancho, New Mexico.

In their inaugural game, the Stars beat the Colorado Ice, 46–39.

== Schedule ==
Key: Win Tie Loss Bye

=== Regular season ===
All start times are local time

Week	Day	Date	Kickoff	Opponent	Results		Location
Week	Day	Date	Kickoff	Opponent	Score	Record	Location
1	BYE						
2	Sunday	February 26	3:05pm	Colorado Ice	W 46-39	1-0	Santa Ana Star Center
3	BYE						
4	Sunday	March 11	3:05pm	Allen Wranglers	L 28-45	1-1	Santa Ana Star Center
5	BYE						
6	BYE						
7	Saturday	March 31	7:05pm	at Wichita Wild	L 24-31	1-2	Hartman Arena
8	Friday	April 6	7:05pm	Tri-Cities Fever	L 62-65	1-3	Comcast Arena at Everett
9	Saturday	April 14	7:05pm	Colorado Ice	W 44-41	2-3	Santa Ana Star Center
10	Friday	April 20	7:05pm	at Wyoming Cavalry	L 46-50	2-4	Casper Events Center
11	Friday	April 27	7:05pm	at Tri-Cities Fever	L 20-37	2-5	Toyota Center
12	Saturday	May 5	7:05pm	at Allen Wranglers	L 61-70	2-6	Allen Event Center
13	Saturday	May 12	7:05pm	Everett Raptors	L 65-74	2-7	Santa Ana Star Center
14	Friday	May 18	7:05pm	at Colorado Ice	L 9-58	2-8	Budweiser Events Center
15	Saturday	May 26	7:05pm	Wyoming Cavalry	L 41-54	2-9	Santa Ana Star Center
16	Thursday	May 31	7:05pm	at Everett Raptors	L 35-57	2-10	Comcast Arena at Everett
17	Saturday	June 9	7:05pm	Wichita Wild	L 42-55	2-11	Santa Ana Star Center
18	Saturday	June 16	7:05pm	at Allen Wranglers	L 70-85	2-12	Allen Event Center

== Roster ==
2012 New Mexico Stars roster
Quarterbacks: 8 Arkelon Hall; 12 Roger Linn; Running backs: 22 DonTrell Moore; Wide receivers: 10 Roland Bruno; 3 Ryan Bugg; 14 Tim Bush; 11 Josh Floyd	Offensive linemen: 55 Lucian Scott; Defensive linemen: 7 Calvin France; 67 Marvin Jones; 90 Johnathan Rainey; 4 Malcolm Tatum	Linebackers: 1 Aleem Harris; 9 Eric Henri; 21 Seth Smith; Defensive backs: 6 Kasey Brown; 1 Ammar Dyson; 17 Terence Peete; 2 DeAndre Wright; Kickers: 19 Zeke Arevalo	Injured Reserve: currently vacant; Exempt List: currently vacant; Refused to Report: currently vacant; rookies in italics Roster updated June 16, 2012; 20 Active, 0 Inactive → More rosters

== Standings ==
2012 Intense Conference
	W	L	T	PCT	PF	PA	DIV	GB	STK
y Tri-Cities Fever	12	2	0	0.857	750	619	12-0	---	W2
x Allen Wranglers	9	5	0	0.643	842	670	9-4	3.0	W3
x Wichita Wild	8	6	0	0.571	658	681	5-3	4.0	L1
x Colorado Ice	8	6	0	0.571	681	595	8-5	4.0	L2
Everett Raptors	5	9	0	0.357	696	781	5-9	7.0	L1
Nebraska Danger	5	9	0	0.357	664	721	3-6	7.0	L1
Wyoming Cavalry	4	10	0	0.286	619	762	3-8	8.0	L2
New Mexico Stars	2	12	0	0.143	541	764	2-12	10.0	L9
