= 2012 Wyoming Cavalry season =

Indoor Football League team season

- Owner: Mike and Argeri Layton
- General manager: Mike Layton
- Head coach: Dan Maciejczak
- Home stadium: Casper Events Center; 1 Events Drive; Casper, WY 82601

Results
- Record: 4-10
- Conference place: 7th Intense
- Playoffs: did not qualify

The 2012 Wyoming Cavalry season was the team's thirteenth season as a football franchise and second in the current Indoor Football League (IFL).

== Regular season ==
All start times are local to home team

Week	Day	Date	Kickoff	Opponent	Results		Location
Week	Day	Date	Kickoff	Opponent	Score	Record	Location
1	BYE						
2	BYE						
3	Sunday	March 4	3:00pm	at Colorado Ice	L 37–72	0–1	Budweiser Events Center
4	Sunday	March 11	5:05pm	Everett Raptors	L 50–68	0–2	Casper Events Center
5	Saturday	March 17	7:05pm	at Omaha Beef	L 52–54	0–3	Omaha Civic Auditorium
6	Friday	March 23	7:05pm	at Nebraska Danger	W 44–43	1–3	Eihusen Arena
7	Friday	March 30	7:05pm	at Tri-Cities Fever	L 41–62	1–4	Toyota Center
8	Friday	April 6	7:05pm	Colorado Ice	L 35–42	1–5	Casper Events Center
9	Friday	April 13	7:05pm	Omaha Beef	W 71–60	2–5	Casper Events Center
10	Saturday	April 20	7:05pm	New Mexico Stars	W 50–46	3–5	Casper Events Center
11	Saturday	April 28	7:00pm	at Colorado Ice	L 33–48	3–6	Budweiser Events Center
12	BYE						
13	Saturday	May 12	7:05pm	Colorado Ice	L 46–59	3–7	Casper Events Center
14	Friday	May 18	7:05pm	Tri-Cities Fever	L 26–30	3–8	Casper Events Center
15	Saturday	May 26	7:05pm	at New Mexico Stars	W 54–41	4–8	Santa Ana Star Center
16	Friday	June 1	7:05pm	Sioux Falls Storm	L 46–71	4–9	Casper Events Center
17	Saturday	June 9	7:05pm	at Tri-Cities Fever	L 34–66	4–10	Toyota Center
18	BYE						

== Roster ==
2012 Wyoming Cavalry roster
Quarterbacks: 16 Matt Strand; Running backs: 21 Josh Schleusner; 25 Keithen Valentine; Wide receivers: 7 Emery Beckles; 3 LaVaughn Macon; 8 Tony Ostheimer; 5 Eddie Thompson	Offensive linemen: 73 Tripp Boatner; 72 Eugene Engram; 79 Nolan Fisher; 78 Robbie Klinetobe; Defensive linemen: 40 Jacob Calderon; 33 Karl Kahau-Liftee; 10 Dominic Payne	Linebackers: 23 Phillip Arias; 2 Ross Cochran; Defensive backs: 19 Michael Eby; 23 Stacy Edwards; 24 Starr Fuimaono; 9 George Kelly; 17 Keith Lewis Jr.; Kickers: currently vacant	Injured Reserve: 1 Scott Thomsen K (IR); 88 Jasonus Tillery WR (IR); Exempt List: currently vacant; Practice squad: currently vacant; rookies in italics Roster updated June 9, 2012; 21 Active, 2 Inactive → More rosters

== Standings ==
2012 Intense Conference
	W	L	T	PCT	PF	PA	DIV	GB	STK
y Tri-Cities Fever	12	2	0	0.857	750	619	12-0	---	W2
x Allen Wranglers	9	5	0	0.643	842	670	9-4	3.0	W3
x Wichita Wild	8	6	0	0.571	658	681	5-3	4.0	L1
x Colorado Ice	8	6	0	0.571	681	595	8-5	4.0	L2
Everett Raptors	5	9	0	0.357	696	781	5-9	7.0	L1
Nebraska Danger	5	9	0	0.357	664	721	3-6	7.0	L1
Wyoming Cavalry	4	10	0	0.286	619	762	3-8	8.0	L2
New Mexico Stars	2	12	0	0.143	541	764	2-12	10.0	L9
