= Mil'Von James =

American gridiron football player (born 1985)

Profile
- Position: Defensive back

Personal information
- Born: September 17, 1985 (age 41); Los Angeles, California, U.S.
- Listed height: 6 ft 0 in (1.83 m)
- Listed weight: 210 lb (95 kg)

Career information
- College: University of Nevada-Las Vegas
- NFL draft: 2008: undrafted

Career history
- 2008: Cleveland Browns*
- 2009: BC Lions*
- * Offseason or practice squad member only

Awards and highlights
- Second-team All-MW (2007); Led NCAA in passes defended (2007)

Mil'Von Keishawn James (born September 17, 1985) is a high school coach of American football. He played college football for the UNLV Rebels, where he led the nation in passes defended, and was not drafted by a professional team in any league. He played college football for the UCLA Bruins from 2003-2005. His younger brother Malik "Fig" James played for the Nevada Wolfpack.

== Early life ==
James graduated in 2003 from Fremont High School in Los Angeles, California

== College career ==
James played college football for the UCLA Bruins from 2003-2005. He transferred to the UNLV Rebels in 2005 along with Eric Wright and Rocky Hinds from the USC Trojans and Tony Cade from the Oklahoma Sooners. As a senior cornerback Mil’Von James was voted to the Second-team-All Mountain West Conference after leading the nation with 19 pass deflections. He would finish his senior season at UNLV with 45 tackles, three force fumbles and one interception. Despite a struggling defense James would be part of the reason that would help land UNLV with the 23rd best pass defense in the nation.

=== Pre-draft ===
Pre-draft measurables
Height	Weight	Arm length	Hand span	40-yard dash	10-yard split	20-yard split	20-yard shuttle	Three-cone drill	Vertical jump	Broad jump	Bench press
5 ft 11 7/8 in (1.83 m)	196 lb (89 kg)	31.5 in (0.80 m)	9.5 in (0.24 m)	4.39 s	1.50 s	2.58 s	4.08 s	6.91 s	37.5 in (0.95 m)	9 ft 7 in (2.92 m)	12 reps

== Coaching career ==
In 2016 as head coach for the Augustus F. Hawkins High School, James was fired for using ineligible players.

In 2021 as coach for Inglewood High School, he received criticism of unsportsmanlike conduct for allowing his team to run up a game to the score of 106-0. The most controversial move came when Coach James went for a two-point conversion when the team was already up 104-0. "How can the Coaching staff of Inglewood High School California feel good about themselves?" quoted the legendary sports announcer Dick Vitale on Twitter.

In 2022 James guided Inglewood to a 13-1 record and the CIF-SS Division 2 final as he continued a remarkable transformation of the program. Mil’von James arrived at Inglewood High School in 2019 and took over a football team that had just gone 0-10.

In his first season, the Sentinels went 12-1 and lost in the CIF-Southern Section Division 13 semifinals by one point.

The Sentinels went undefeated in the shortened 2020 spring season and since then they’ve been on a roll, going 24-2 in the last two seasons. They advanced to the CIF-SS Division 2 semifinals in 2021 and this season they went 13-1 and reached the finals. Leading the way has been James, who is the 2022 Daily Breeze football coach of the year. Inglewood is 36-3 in three full seasons under James and 40-3 overall.

“I know where we started in year one and how far we’ve gone to get to where we are now,” James said. “It’s a testament to the hard work of my staff. I think we’re ahead of our five-year plan and the best days are ahead of us.
