= New Mexico Goatheads =

Minor league ice hockey team in New Mexico

- City: Rio Rancho, New Mexico
- League: ECHL
- Founded: 2025
- Home arena: Rio Rancho Events Center
- Colors: Desert red, sand, Rio Grande blue
- Owner: Rev Entertainment
- Head coach: Zack Stortini
- Affiliates: Colorado Avalanche (NHL); Colorado Eagles (AHL)
- Website: nmgoatheads.com

Franchise history
- 2026 – onwards: New Mexico Goatheads

The New Mexico Goatheads are a professional minor league ice hockey team based in Rio Rancho, New Mexico, in the Albuquerque metropolitan area. The Goatheads play in the ECHL as an affiliate of the Colorado Avalanche of the NHL and the Colorado Eagles of the AHL and bring New Mexico its first professional hockey team since the folding of the New Mexico Scorpions in 2009. Home games are played at Rio Rancho Events Center.

The Goatheads are owned by Rev Entertainment, which also operates the Cleburne Railroaders and Kane County Cougars of the American Association of Professional Baseball. It was also announced that the Dallas Stars will act as consultants in hockey operations and player development.

== History ==
=== Formation ===
Attempts to form an ECHL expansion team in Rio Rancho by a different ownership group were first reported in 2022 with intent to play in 2023, which never materialized. In May 2025, the ECHL announced that it would be awarding an expansion franchise to the city of Rio Rancho, New Mexico, marking the return of professional hockey to the state.

=== Name ===
The team solicited and received approximately 2,000 entries for potential team names before narrowing it down to three finalists: the "Cutthroats" (a New Mexico native species of trout), "Goatheads" (a thorny seed shaped like the head of a goat), and "Tarantula hawks" (a native wasp-like insect that preys on tarantulas). A poll featuring the finalists was held for future fans to choose the name. New Mexico Goatheads was announced as the winning name on September 29, 2025.

== Venue ==
The Goatheads will play their home games at the Rio Rancho Events Center, a multi-purpose venue located in the heart of Rio Rancho. The arena, which has a seating capacity of 7,000, is a central hub for sports and entertainment in the Albuquerque metropolitan area. Owned by the City of Rio Rancho and operated by Global Spectrum, the venue has hosted a variety of sports events, including professional hockey in the past.

== Affiliations ==
While the Dallas Stars of the National Hockey League (NHL) were announced as official consultants in hockey operations and player development, the Goatheads were not expected to be the Stars' ECHL affiliate as Dallas had extended their long-running affiliation with the ECHL Idaho Steelheads through 2027, marking 23 years of affiliation. The Goatheads did not initially announce an affiliate. In February 2026, they announced their affiliation agreement with the Colorado Avalanche and Colorado Eagles, beginning with the 2026–27 NHL season.
