= 2012 Everett Raptors season =

Indoor Football League team season

- General manager: Mike Berry
- Head coach: Sean Ponder
- Home stadium: Comcast Arena at Everett; 2000 Hewitt Avenue. Suite 200; Everett, WA 98201

Results
- Record: 5-9
- Conference place: 5th Intense
- Playoffs: did not qualify

The 2012 Everett Raptors season was the team's third season as a professional indoor football franchise and third in the Indoor Football League (IFL). One of sixteen teams competing in the IFL for the 2012 season, the Everett, Washington-based Everett Raptors were members of the Intense Conference.

Under the leadership of owner/general manager Mike Barry and head coach Sean Ponder, the team played their home games at the Comcast Arena at Everett in Everett, Washington.

== Schedule ==
Key: Win Tie Loss Bye

=== Regular season ===
All start times are local time

Week	Day	Date	Kickoff	Opponent	Results		Location
Week	Day	Date	Kickoff	Opponent	Score	Record	Location
1	BYE						
2	Saturday	February 25	7:05pm	at Tri-Cities Fever	L 44-70	0-1	Toyota Center
3	Thursday	March 1	7:05pm	Allen Wranglers	L 27-48	0-2	Comcast Arena at Everett
4	Sunday	March 11	5:05pm	at Wyoming Cavalry	W 68-50	1-2	Casper Events Center
5	BYE						
6	Thursday	March 22	7:05pm	Tri-Cities Fever	L 48-54	1-3	Comcast Arena at Everett
7	Saturday	March 31	7:00pm	Colorado Ice	L 36-49	1-4	Comcast Arena at Everett
8	Thursday	April 5	7:05pm	Nebraska Danger	W 52-35	2-4	Comcast Arena at Everett
9	Friday	April 13	7:05pm	at Tri-Cities Fever	L 33-54	2-5	Toyota Center
10	BYE						
11	Friday	April 27	7:05pm	at Nebraska Danger	L 59-68	2-6	Eihusen Arena
12	Friday	May 4	7:05pm	Tri-Cities Fever	L 61-70	2-7	Comcast Arena at Everett
13	Saturday	May 12	7:05pm	at New Mexico Stars	W 74-65	3-7	Santa Ana Star Center
14	Saturday	May 19	7:05pm	at Allen Wranglers	W 74-73	4-7	Allen Event Center
15	Saturday	May 26	7:05pm	Colorado Ice	L 25-54	4-8	Comcast Arena at Everett
16	Thursday	May 31	7:05pm	New Mexico Stars	W 57-35	5-8	Comcast Arena at Everett
17	Thursday	June 7	7:05pm	Allen Wranglers	L 38-56	5-9	Comcast Arena at Everett
18	BYE						

== Roster ==
2012 Everett Raptors roster
Quarterbacks: 12 Shane Austin; Running backs: 28 De'Maundray Woolridge; Wide receivers: 3 Mike Tatum; 9 Travis Poole; 6 Eric Taylor; 2 Maurice Young	Offensive linemen: 7 Andy Endemann; 65 Albert Erni Jr.; 68 John Mobley; 96 Maurice Robinson; 98 Ryan Pahua; 72 Eddie Williams; Defensive linemen: 91 Sean Enesi; 32 Maksim Kuzyuberdin; 93 Jermaine Smith; 44 Warren Tauanuu	Linebackers: 5 Walner Leandre; 13 DeWayne Patterson; 29 Eric Pederson; Defensive backs: 4 Brandon Belcher; 10 Jeremiah Captain; 6 T. J. McCord; 24 Austin Smith; 23 Cashmin Thomas; Kickers: 21 Dan Kleckner	Injured Reserve: 93 John Fields DL (IR); 15 Andre Piper-Jordan WR (IR); 62 Richard Posey DL (IR); 25 Marcus Robinson RB (IR); 4 Lonie Sanders WR (IR); Exempt List: 12 Blake Bolles QB (Exempt); 72 Jordan Taormina OL (Exempt); Refused to Report: 13 Jihad Morris DB (DNR); rookies in italics Roster updated June 5, 2012; 25 Active, 8 Inactive → More rosters

== Standings ==
2012 Intense Conference
	W	L	T	PCT	PF	PA	DIV	GB	STK
y Tri-Cities Fever	12	2	0	0.857	750	619	12-0	---	W2
x Allen Wranglers	9	5	0	0.643	842	670	9-4	3.0	W3
x Wichita Wild	8	6	0	0.571	658	681	5-3	4.0	L1
x Colorado Ice	8	6	0	0.571	681	595	8-5	4.0	L2
Everett Raptors	5	9	0	0.357	696	781	5-9	7.0	L1
Nebraska Danger	5	9	0	0.357	664	721	3-6	7.0	L1
Wyoming Cavalry	4	10	0	0.286	619	762	3-8	8.0	L2
New Mexico Stars	2	12	0	0.143	541	764	2-12	10.0	L9
