= Jeremiah Price =

American football player (born 1988)

No. 56 – Jacksonville Sharks
- Position: Defensive end
- Roster status: Active

Personal information
- Born: February 19, 1988 (age 38); Ellisville, Mississippi
- Listed height: 6 ft 3 in (1.91 m)
- Listed weight: 245 lb (111 kg)

Career information
- High school: Collins (MS)
- College: Oklahoma State
- NFL draft: 2010: undrafted

Career history
- Green Bay Blizzard (2011); Sioux Falls Storm (2012–2013); Cedar Rapids Titans (2014–2015); New Orleans VooDoo (2015); Cedar Rapids Titans (2016); Sioux Falls Storm (2017)*; Jacksonville Sharks (2017–present)
- * Offseason or practice squad member only

Awards and highlights
- United Bowl MVP (2012); 2× United Bowl champion (2012, 2013); NAL champion (2017); NAL championship game MVP (2017); 2nd Team All-IFL (2013); 2× 1st Team All-IFL (2015, 2016); 2x IFL Defensive Player of the Year (2015, 2016); First Team All-NAL (2017)

Career AFL statistics
- Tackles: 1
- Stats at ArenaFan.com

Jeremiah Price (born February 19, 1988) is a professional gridiron football defensive end for the Jacksonville Sharks of the Indoor Football League (IFL).

== Early life ==
Born the son of Alice and Jasper Price, Jeremiah attended Collins High School where he participated on the football and basketball teams. As a member of the football team, Price was named an All-State selection in 2006. (born February 19, 1988)

== College career ==
Price began his collegiate career at Jones County Junior College. After two stellar seasons at Jones County, Price was recruited by Louisville, Oklahoma State, South Florida, Southern Miss, UAB and West Virginia. On December 9, 2007, Price committed to Oklahoma State University.
