= Malik "Fig" James =

American football player (born 1988)

Malik James
No. 36
- Position: Cornerback

Personal information
- Born: October 6, 1988 (age 38); Los Angeles, California
- Listed height: 6 ft 0 in (1.83 m)
- Listed weight: 195 lb (88 kg)

Career information
- High school: Los Angeles (CA) Fremont
- College: Langston University
- NFL draft: 2013: undrafted

Career history
- Dallas Cowboys (2013)

Malik Montra James (born October 6, 1988) is a former professional American football cornerback. He played college football for the Langston Lions. He was signed by the Dallas Cowboys May 17, 2013, and released by the Cowboys on June 11, 2013. He also played college football for the Cincinnati Bearcats in 2009 and Nevada Wolfpack from 2010 to 2012. His older brother Mil'Von James was signed by the Cleveland Browns in 2008.

== Pre-draft ==
Pre-draft measurables
Height	Weight	Arm length	Hand span	40-yard dash	10-yard split	20-yard split	20-yard shuttle	Three-cone drill	Broad jump	Bench press
5 ft 11 7/8 in (1.83 m)	189 lb (86 kg)	30.5 in (0.77 m)	9 in (0.23 m)	4.24 s	1.52 s	2.50 s	4.12 s	6.98 s	9 ft 9 in (2.97 m)	19 reps
