= Marion-Franklin High School =

Public high school in Columbus, Ohio, United States

Location
- 1265 Koebel Road; Columbus, (Franklin County), Ohio 43207; United States; 39°54′42″N 82°57′40″W

Information
- Type: Public high school
- Motto: South-side Pride.
- Established: 1953
- School district: Columbus City Schools
- Superintendent: Angela Chapman
- Principal: Tanita Fleming
- Teaching staff: 27.00 (FTE)
- Grades: 9-12
- Enrollment: 450 (2023-2024)
- Student to teacher ratio: 16.67
- Colors: Red and white
- Fight song: "Stand Up And Cheer"
- Athletics conference: Columbus City League
- Team name: Red Devils
- Rival: Columbus South High School
- Accreditation: North Central Association of Colleges and Schools
- Communities served: Marion-Franklin Civic Association
- Feeder schools: Buckeye Middle School
- Website: School website

Marion-Franklin High School (MFHS, Marion) is a four-year high school (grades 9–12) located on the south side of Columbus, Ohio, at 1265 Koebel Road. Marion-Franklin is one of 17 traditional high schools in the Columbus City Schools district. The school colors are red and white, with black as an unofficial color. The school mascot is the Red Devil.

== Administration ==
There are three administrators at Marion-Franklin High School: a head principal, and two assistant principals.

== Sports ==
=== Fall ===
- American football
- Soccer
- Girls' volleyball
- Cross country
- Girls' tennis
- Golf
- Cheerleading
- Drill team (Marionettes)
- Marching band
- Mock trial
- Majorettes (baton twirlers)

=== Winter ===
- Basketball
- Wrestling
- Girls' basketball
- Cheerleading

=== Spring ===
- Baseball
- Softball
- Track and field

== Scandal ==
Several district employees were caught altering attendance records for struggling students in order to improve performance ratings. Because of this, former principal Pamela K. Diggs was fired in early 2014.

== Notable alumni ==
- Ken Lanier, former NFL player (Denver Broncos)
- Eddie Milner, former MLB player (Cincinnati Reds, San Francisco Giants)
- Mike Tatum, former Marion basketball and football player; former four-time IFL champion, Sioux Falls (2013–16)
- Herb Williams, former NBA player (Indiana Pacers, Dallas Mavericks, New York Knicks, Toronto Raptors)
- John Williamson (born 1986), basketball player for Hapoel Tel Aviv B.C. of the Israeli Basketball Premier League
