= Rowdy (Dallas Cowboys) =

Mascot for the NFL's Dallas Cowboys

Rowdy (right) with a fan (left) during a '08 game.

Rowdy is the official mascot of the National Football League's Dallas Cowboys.

== Development and early years ==
Rowdy was originally developed by NFL Properties in the early 1990s as a cowboy/football player character named "Big D" who was part of the Team NFL Heroes league-wide mascot program. Merchandise showing an early version of Rowdy with his name listed as Big D was marketed to children and teenagers during the 1994 and 1995 NFL seasons. Big D made public appearances at Cowboys games and other events as early as 1994 but wasn't adopted by the Cowboys as their official mascot until 1996 after his name was changed to Rowdy and adjustments to his character design had been made.

== Character design and appearance ==
Rowdy wears a Dallas Cowboys' football uniform combined with classic western attire including an oversized cowboy hat, chaps, and cowboy boots. His jersey number is 00 (pronounced "double zero").

== Role as mascot ==
Rowdy has been the Cowboys' official mascot since 1996. His tenure overlapped with that of Crazy Ray who was the unofficial mascot of the Cowboys from 1962 until his death in 2007. As the Ambassador of the Dallas Cowboys, Rowdy's job includes, but is not limited to creating game day enthusiasm at AT&T Stadium. He does this at home games by driving in on his four-wheeler, tossing t-shirts into the stands, using signs like "Let's Go Cowboys," and mocking the opponents. Rowdy participates at every home game and selected away games. Rowdy himself reports to Charlotte Jones Anderson).

In 2015, Rowdy was named "Most Hated NFL Mascot" by Sports Illustrated.

== Community involvement ==
Rowdy is involved with, takes part in, and/or makes appearances at the following: the Susan G. Komen Race for the Cure, The Salvation Army, The Rise School of Dallas, the Special Olympics, retirement centers, hospitals, schools, birthday parties, grand openings, Minor League Baseball games around the country, conventions, parades, grocery store promotions, Dallas Mavericks NBA games, weddings, and community events. He has even been to the Pro Bowl at least three times: in 1995 before being adopted by the Cowboys as their official mascot, and in 1999 and 2001. He has also taken part in televised events, including ESPN's Alumni Beach Bowl, ABC's Battle of the Gridiron and the Special Olympics.

== Training camp promotions ==
At Cowboys training camp Rowdy can be found playing with kids at Rowdy's Kid Zone. He interacts with children during practice. He is also known to play with the children, as well as other staff members, fans and players.

== Mascot convention participation ==
Rowdy represents the Cowboys each year in selected cities for the annual mascot convention. At this event the NFL mascots compare and share ideas to help continue mascot antics and ways to market mascot awareness.
