= Rocky Hinds =

American football player (born 1986)

No. 3
- Position: Quarterback

Personal information
- Born: February 13, 1986 (age 40); Los Angeles, California, U.S.
- Listed height: 6 ft 5 in (1.96 m)
- Listed weight: 230 lb (104 kg)

Career information
- High school: St. Bernard (Los Angeles, California)
- College: USC (2004); UNLV (2005–2007)
- NFL draft: 2009: undrafted

Career history
- Omaha Beef (2010)*; Bloomington Extreme/Edge (2010–2012); Allen Wranglers (2012)*; Nebraska Danger (2012); Wichita Wild (2013–2014); Wichita Force (2015)*
- * Offseason or practice squad member only

Awards and highlights
- IFL MIP (2012); Champions Bowl I MVP (2013); 2× CPIFL Champion (2013),(2014); CPIFL MVP (2014)

Rocky Lee Hinds (born February 13, 1986) is an American former football quarterback. He was the starting quarterback for the UNLV Rebels after transferring from the USC Trojans.

== High school ==
Hinds was a highly recruited athlete who was a member of the 2004 graduating class of St. Bernard High School located in Los Angeles, California. He was considered in the Top Ten HS Quarterbacks in the nation. In his Senior season Rocky suffered a season-ending injury due to a torn anterior cruciate ligament (ACL) in the right knee. Despite the injury he was still named a Super Prep All-American, PrepStar All-American, PrepStar Top 100 Dream Team, Tom Lemming Top 100, Super Prep All- Farwest, Prep All- West, Long Beach Press-Telegram Best in the West first team, Tacoma News Tribune Western 100 and Orange County Register Fab 15.

According to Scout.com Hinds was ranked #18 for his position. As a junior (2002) he was named the All-del Rey League Offensive MVP due to his amazing performance that season by throwing 1,643 yards with a total of 15 TDs and 8 ints. Not only did he throw, he also ran 475 yards for 5 TDs. Besides football, Rocky also was a member of the track team. His best result was 10.47 in the 100 meters he also won the 2003 CIF Division IV 100, 22.0 in the 200, 23-7 in the long jump and 6-10 in the high jump. He was recruited by USC, Arizona State, California, Nebraska, and UCLA.

== College ==
=== USC ===
After a visit to the campus in January of his freshman year in high school, Rocky received a football scholarship to the University of Southern California. In 2004, Hinds was redshirt as a freshman quarterback for Head Coach Pete Carroll. Hinds became dissatisfied at USC when he was listed and 3rd on the depth chart behind Matt Leinart and John David Booty, and with the additional pressure of incoming freshman Mark Sanchez. Hinds shopped around at other colleges looking to transfer to, most notably was Texas. After Hinds decided to transfer to UNLV, accusations arrived that UNLV was tampering with the transfer, but Hinds stated that, "There was no tampering."

=== UNLV ===
Hinds was part of the 2005 UNLV transfer class that included Eric Wright (USC), Tony Cade (Oklahoma) and Mil'Von James (UCLA). In the 2005 Season Rocky was redshirted as he transferred to UNLV. Due to NCAA transfer guidelines Hinds was able to practice with the team but could not be active. In 2006, he earned his first college athletic letter by playing in all 12 games (started 11). On his first game against Idaho State, Hinds threw for 322 yards (24 for 42) with a TD and a single rushing TD. The first TD pass was a 71-yard pass to Ryan Wolfe. At the end of the season, he passed for 2,148 yrs which is ranked 8th in school history. College Football News ranked Number 94th candidate for 2006 Heisman Trophy. In 2006, he was a member of the Rebel Leadership Committee.During the 2007 off-season, Rocky had right knee surgery to repair a partially torn ACL. Despite the injury he was named preseason second team All-MWC by Athlon and third team by Phil Steele's and was ranked as Number 27th best QB in college football. Sporting New listed Hinds as having the strongest arm in the Mountain West. Due to injuries Rocky did not play his senior year.

=== College statistics ===
Year	Team	Games			Passing								Rushing			
Year	Team	GP	GS	Record	Cmp	Att	Pct	Yds	Avg	TD	Int	Rtg	Att	Yds	Avg	TD
2004	USC	0	0	—	Redshirt											
2005	UNLV	0	0	—	Did not play due to NCAA transfer rules											
2006	UNLV	12	11	2−9	194	359	54.0	2,148	6.0	8	13	104.4	49	-49	-1.0	1
2007	UNLV	0	0	—	Did not play due to ACL injury											
Career		12	11	2−9	194	359	54.0	2,148	6.0	8	13	104.4	49	-49	-1.0	1

== Professional ==
On January 15, 2010 Rocky Hinds was signed by the Omaha Beef of the Indoor Football League. Later on, the Bloomington Extreme acquired the rights to Hinds. On April 12, Rocky made his indoor football debut by starting for the Extreme against the Chicago Slaughter. In that game, Hinds completed 16 of 30 passes with 4 touchdowns and 1 interception, but the Express lost 50-43. He played for the Bloomington Edge for two years and lead the team to two playoff appearances. On October 21, 2011, the Allen Wranglers signed Hinds.

=== Wichita Wild ===
In 2013, Hinds signed with the Wichita Wild of the Champions Professional Indoor Football League (CPIFL). During his first year with the Wild, Hinds finished the season with a quarterback rating of 102.18, completing 183 of 296 pass attempts, scoring 49 passing touchdowns and 8 rushing touchdowns for 2117 total yards. His play earned him several awards including Championship Game MVP, CPIFL Offensive Player of the Week (Week 3) and an honorable mention as CPIFL MVP of the year. In 2014, Hinds lead the Wild to the best record in the CPIFL, while also winning the league's MVP award.

=== Coaching ===
In 2015, Hinds became a QB coach and pass game coordinator for Bethel College.

== Personal life ==
Rocky Hinds Jr. is the son of Ernestine Frazier and Rocky Hinds(65), Sr. He has a brother, Brandon and a sister Belissa. At UNLV he majored in University Studies.
