= 2012 Wichita Wild season =

Indoor Football League team season

- Owner: Wink Hartman
- Head coach: Paco Martinez
- Home stadium: Hartman Arena; 8151 N. Hartman Arena Drive; Park City, KS 67147

Results
- Record: 8-6
- Conference place: 3rd Intense
- Playoffs: Won IC Semifinals (Wranglers) 43-40; Lost IC Championship (Fever) 30-51

The 2012 Wichita Wild season was the team's sixth season as a professional indoor football franchise and fourth in the Indoor Football League (IFL). One of sixteen teams competing in the IFL for the 2012 season, the Park City, Kansas-based Wichita Wild were members of the Intense Conference.

Under the leadership of head coach Paco Martinez, the team played their home games at the Hartman Arena in Park City, Kansas.

== Schedule ==
Key: Win Tie Loss Bye

=== Regular season ===
All start times are local time

Week	Day	Date	Kickoff	Opponent	Results		Location
Week	Day	Date	Kickoff	Opponent	Score	Record	Location
1	BYE						
2	Saturday	February 25	7:05pm	at Allen Wranglers	L 30-50	0-1	Allen Event Center
3	Friday	March 2	7:05pm	at Omaha Beef	L 35-38	0-2	Omaha Civic Auditorium
4	Friday	March 9	7:05pm	Sioux Falls Storm	L 54-81	0-3	Hartman Arena
5	BYE						
6	Saturday	March 24	7:05pm	Allen Wranglers	L 48-61	0-4	Hartman Arena
7	Saturday	March 31	7:05pm	New Mexico Stars	W 31-24	1-4	Hartman Arena
8	Friday	April 6	7:05pm	at Omaha Beef	W 50-47	2-4	Omaha Civic Auditorium
9	Saturday	April 14	7:05pm	at Nebraska Danger	L 24-42	2-5	Eihusen Arena
10	BYE						
11	Saturday	April 28	7:05pm	Allen Wranglers	W 55-54	3-5	Hartman Arena
12	Saturday	May 5	7:05pm	Omaha Beef	W 77-41	4-5	Hartman Arena
13	BYE						
14	Saturday	May 19	7:05pm	Nebraska Danger	W 57-50	5-5	Hartman Arena
15	Saturday	May 26	7:05pm	at Allen Wranglers	W 59-41	6-5	Allen Event Center
16	Saturday	June 2	7:05pm	Bloomington Edge	W 39-38	7-5	Hartman Arena
17	Saturday	June 9	7:05pm	at New Mexico Stars	W 55-42	8-5	Santa Ana Star Center
18	Saturday	June 16	7:00pm	at Green Bay Blizzard	L 41-72	8-6	Resch Center

== Postseason ==
Week	Day	Date	Kickoff	Opponent	Results		Location
Week	Day	Date	Kickoff	Opponent	Score	Record	Location
IC Semifinals	Monday	June 25	7:05pm	at Allen Wranglers	W 43-40	1-0	Allen Event Center
IC Championship	Friday	June 29	7:05pm	at Tri-Cities Fever	L 30-51	1-1	Toyota Center

== Roster ==
2012 Wichita Wild roster
Quarterbacks: 5 Marcus Jackson; Running backs: 22 Tywon Hubbard; Wide receivers: 11 Brian Murph; 18 Kyle Riffle; 1 Tim Simmons; 9 Landon Turner	Offensive linemen: 53 Brett Cavanah; 76 Tommy Crowley; 92 Marcus Miles; Defensive linemen: 62 Callahan Bright; 97 Kwame Jordan; 99 Matt Moss	Linebackers: 23 Andre Morgan; Defensive backs: 4 Kiaree Daniels; 24 Kendrick Harper; 20 Darvin Peterson; 6 Scooter Rogers; 2 Rashad Washington; Kickers: 8 James Chandler	Injured Reserve: currently vacant; Exempt List: currently vacant; Refused to Report: currently vacant; rookies in italics Roster updated June 29, 2012; 19 Active, 0 Inactive → More rosters

== Standings ==
2012 Intense Conference
	W	L	T	PCT	PF	PA	DIV	GB	STK
y Tri-Cities Fever	12	2	0	0.857	750	619	12-0	---	W2
x Allen Wranglers	9	5	0	0.643	842	670	9-4	3.0	W3
x Wichita Wild	8	6	0	0.571	658	681	5-3	4.0	L1
x Colorado Ice	8	6	0	0.571	681	595	8-5	4.0	L2
Everett Raptors	5	9	0	0.357	696	781	5-9	7.0	L1
Nebraska Danger	5	9	0	0.357	664	721	3-6	7.0	L1
Wyoming Cavalry	4	10	0	0.286	619	762	3-8	8.0	L2
New Mexico Stars	2	12	0	0.143	541	764	2-12	10.0	L9
