= Mike Tatum =

American football player (born 1986)

Omaha Beef
- Title: Head coach & Offensive coordinator

Personal information
- Born: April 29, 1986 (age 40); Columbus, Ohio, U.S.
- Listed height: 5 ft 9 in (1.75 m)
- Listed weight: 165 lb (75 kg)

Career information
- High school: Columbus (OH) Marion-Franklin
- College: Oxnard
- NFL draft: 2008: undrafted

Career history

Playing
- Marion Mayhem (2009–2010); Fort Wayne FireHawks (2010); Marion Blue Racers (2011); Everett Raptors (2012); Sioux Falls Storm (2013); Marion Blue Racers (2014); Sioux Falls Storm (2014–2018); Bismarck Bucks (2019); Nebraska Danger (2019)

Coaching
- Omaha Beef (2023) Assistant head coach & Offensive coordinator; Omaha Beef (2024–present) Head coach & Offensive coordinator

Awards and highlights
- 1st Team All-CIFL as a Kick Returner (2010); 2× CIFL Special Teams Player of the Year (2010, 2011); 1st Team All-IFL as a Kick Returner (2012); IFL Special Teams Player of the Year (2012); 4× United Bowl champion (2013–2016); First Team All-CIFL as a Wide Receiver (2014)

Mike Anthony Tatum (born April 29, 1986) is an American football coach who is the head coach and offensive coordinator for the Omaha Beef of the National Arena League (NAL). He is former indoor American football wide receiver for the Nebraska Danger, Bismarck Bucks, and the Sioux Falls Storm of the Indoor Football League (IFL). He played college football at Oxnard College. He signed as an undrafted free agent with the Marion Mayhem in 2009. He played with the Mayhem until their disbanding during the 2010 season. Tatum then finished the 2010 season with the Fort Wayne FireHawks. Tatum then returned to Marion in 2011, when a new franchise called the Marion Blue Racers expanded into the CIFL. Tatum has also played for the Everett Raptors of the IFL.

== Early life ==
Tatum was a graduate of Marion-Franklin High School in Columbus, Ohio. He excelled in football, basketball and track & field.

== College career ==
Tatum continued his academic and athletic abilities at Oxnard College in Oxnard, California.

== Professional career ==
=== Marion Mayhem ===
In 2009, Tatum joined the Marion Mayhem as a wide receiver and return man. After a 61–57 comeback win over the Wheeling Wildcats, Tatum was named the CIFL Special Teams Player of the Week. After 6 games with the Mayhem in 2010, the team folded for financial reasons. At the time Tatum was leading the Mayhem with 20 catches for 243 yards and 3 touchdowns. Tatum also had 23 kickoff returns for 500 yards and 2 touchdowns.

=== Fort Wayne FireHawks ===
After the season abruptly ended for the Mayhem, Tatum, as well as a few other Mayhem players, signed to play with the Fort Wayne Firehawks, also of the CIFL. Tatum was able to return one missed field goal for a touchdown in the final game of the season against the Chicago Cardinals. In his two games for the FireHawks, he had 2 catches for 19 yards and a touchdown, as well as returning one kickoff for 21 yards. For his efforts on the season, Tatum was rewarded with the CIFL's Special Teams Player of the Year award.

=== Marion Blue Racers ===
In 2011, the city of Marion got a new indoor football team in the form of the Marion Blue Racers, owned by former Pittsburgh Steelers player, LaMonte Coleman. He was twice named the CIFL Special Teams Player of the Week. The team went on to a record 8–2 regular season, during which Tatum racked up 23 kickoff returns for 568 yards and 2 scores, and again won CIFL Special Teams Player of the Year honors. He led the Blue Racers with 26 catches for 310 yards and 11 touchdowns. He also rushed for 2 touchdowns and threw for another. Tatum re-signed with the Blue Racers for the 2012 season, as they transitioned into the UIFL.

=== Everett Raptors ===
In 2012 Mike Tatum signed to play with Indoor Football League expansion team Everett Raptors. The team ultimately finished 5–9, Tatum was named IFL Special Teams Player Of The Week 2 times, including week 3 and week 12. Playing in only 12 games, due to injury, he racked up 1015 kick return yards on 48 attempts, averaging 21.1 yards per return and also had 5 kickoffs returned for touchdowns. He tied the record for the longest return at 48 yards. Tatum also had 23 receptions for 325 yards averaging 14.1 yds per game. His longest reception was 41 yards. He also had 5 receiving touchdowns. Tatum rushed for 28 yards and a score on 16 attempts. Tatum finished the season second in all purpose yards with 1478 and 11 total TDs Tatum's efforts were good enough to earn him 2012 IFL Special Teams Player of The Year honors.

=== Sioux Falls Storm ===
Tatum signed with the Sioux Falls Storm, also of the Indoor Football League, for the 2013 season.

=== Marion Blue Racers ===
Tatum re-joined the Blue Racers for the 2014 season.

=== Sioux Fall Storm ===
After the Blue Racers season ended, Tatum re-joined the Storm. Tatum enjoyed a 2015 season that saw him finish 7th in the IFL in All-purpose yards. Tatum returned to the Storm for 2016. On October 16, 2017, Tatum re-signed with the Storm.

=== Bismarck Bucks ===
On January 28, 2019, Tatum signed with the Bismarck Bucks.

== Coaching career ==
=== Omaha Beef ===
On February 6, 2023, Tatum was hired as the assistant head coach and offensive coordinator for the Omaha Beef of Champions Indoor Football (CIF).

On December 22, 2023, Tatum was promoted to head coach for the Beef for their first season in the National Arena League (NAL), after the previous head coach Rayshaun Kizer resigned.

== Head coaching record ==
League	Team	Year	Regular season				Postseason			
League	Team	Year	Won	Lost	Win %	Finish	Won	Lost	Win %	Result
NAL	OMA	2024	8	0	1.000	1st	1	0	1.000	Won Championship
NAL total			8	0	1.000		1	0	1.000	
Career total			8	0	1.000		1	0	1.000	
