= Angel of the Winds Casino Resort =

Indian casino of the Stillaguamish Tribe near Arlington, Washington

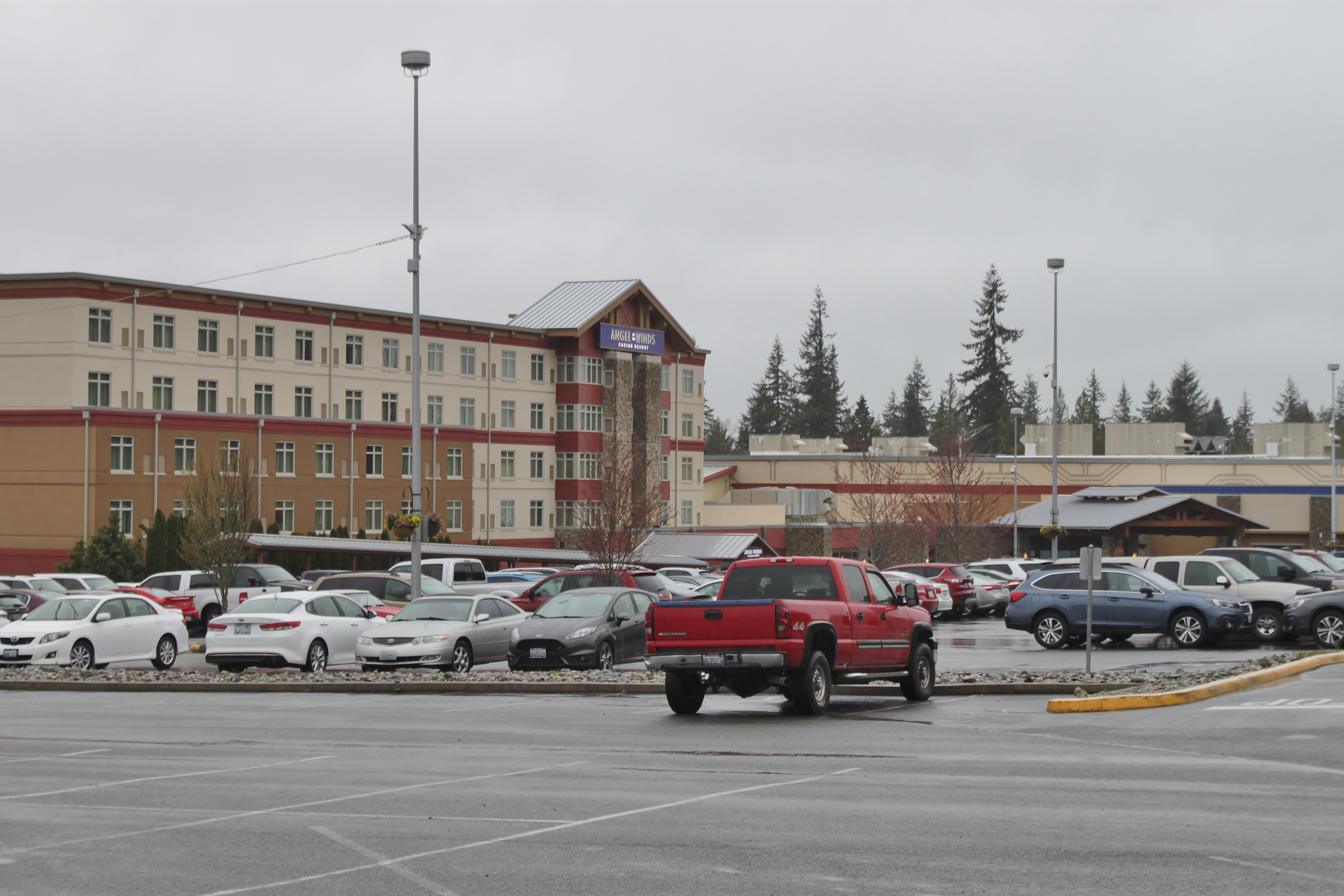

- Location within Washington (state)
- Interactive map of Angel of the Winds Casino Resort
- Location: 3438 Stoluckquamish Lane Arlington, Washington, U.S.; 48°12′52″N 122°11′05″W
- Opened: October 28, 2004
- Casino type: Indian
- Owner: Stillaguamish Tribe of Indians
- Renovated in: 2008, 2015
- Website: angelofthewinds.com

Angel of the Winds Casino Resort is a casino and hotel operated by the Stillaguamish Tribe of Indians near Arlington, Washington, United States. The casino opened in 2004 east of Interstate 5 and was initially in a modular building until an expansion in 2008. A 125-room hotel opened at the site in 2015 alongside additional gaming space.

== History ==
The Stillaguamish Tribe, a party to the Treaty of Point Elliott of 1855, became federally recognized in 1976, but lacked a reservation and had limited revenue from small commercial ventures. In November 2002, the 200 member tribe announced plans to build a casino under the states's enhanced tribal gambling law passed two years earlier. The selected site, on the tribe's trust lands along 35th Avenue Northeast near Interstate 5 west of Arlington, drew backlash from nearby residents concerned about traffic impacts and the loss of the area's rural character. The Tribe planned to demolish 30 homes on a 20-acre (8.1 ha) property it owned, asking members living there to relocate with property buybacks. Plans called for the use of a controlled burn by the Bryant Fire Department to raze the site, allowing firefighters to train during the demolition, but the proposal was withdrawn. The $36 million casino project was initially planned to be funded by a loan from a Las Vegas investor though a Michigan pension fund, but the investor's refusal to submit documents to the Washington State Gambling Commission delayed the project indefinitely in May 2003.

A $19 million loan from the Marshall Bank was announced in January 2004, reviving the project. The casino, named "Angel of the Winds", was scaled down from 40,000 square feet (3,700 m^{2}) to 22,000 square feet (2,000 m^{2}). It was redesigned to be a temporary venue, with modular elements that could be sold off once the tribe opened a permanent casino near Smokey Point. The Angel of the Winds Casino opened on October 28, 2004, with 425 slot machines and 10 to 12 game tables. The opening of Angel of the Winds came a few weeks after the Tulalip Tribes reopened the competing Quil Ceda Creek Casino in Marysville as a local alternative to the larger Tulalip Casino. During its full year of operation, the casino generated nearly $30 million in revenue for the Stillaguamish Tribe. The tribe was asked by the Washington State Department of Transportation to remove a billboard on Interstate 5 advertising the casino, after outcry from residents opposed to the casino.

A $44 million expansion to the casino was completed in December 2008, increasing the number of slot machines to 1,000 and the interior space to 57,000 square feet (5,300 m^{2}). A second, $27 million expansion completed in January 2015 added a five-story hotel with 125 rooms and a smoke shop. Angel of the Winds was marketed towards local residents and continued to grow despite competition from nearby casinos. The Angel of the Winds Casino and surrounding land formed the Stillaguamish Tribe's designated reservation, approved by the Bureau of Indian Affairs in 2014.

In December 2017, the Stillaguamish Tribe signed a 10-year, $3.4 million naming rights deal to sponsor the Angel of the Winds Arena in Everett.

The casino announced a $60 million expansion program in 2018, which will add 300,000 square feet (28,000 m^{2}) of space, including more gaming space, a restaurant, and a parking garage for 575 vehicles. The first section of the expansion, an expanded gaming floor and bar, opened in August 2019 alongside the three-story parking garage. They were followed a month later by a bowling alley and 8,800-square-foot (820 m^{2}) events center. The casino was closed for two months during the COVID-19 pandemic and became the first in Western Washington to reopen, doing so on May 13, 2020, with limited capacity and temperature checks. The casino also introduced a no-smoking policy for the entire building.

Heritage Distilleries opened a bar and distillery inside the casino in October 2024. It is the first distillery to open in a Washington casino, under the provisions of a 2018 federal law that allowed tribes to distill alcohol on reservations.
