= Everett Raptors =

Professional indoor football team based in Everett, Washington

Logo

General information
- Founded: 2009
- Folded: 2012
- Headquartered: Comcast Arena at Everett in Everett, Washington
- Colors: Midnight blue, gold, red, white

Personnel
- Owner: Tom Dowling
- General manager: Mike Barry
- Head coach: Sean Ponder

Team history
- Kent Predators (2010–2011); Seattle Timberwolves (2011); Everett Raptors (2012)

Home fields
- ShoWare Center (2010–2011); Comcast Arena at Everett (2012)

League / conference affiliations
- Indoor Football League (2010–2012): Intense Conference (2010–2012); Pacific North (2010); Pacific (2011)

The Everett Raptors were a professional indoor football team based in Everett, Washington. The Raptors were member of the Intense Conference of the Indoor Football League (IFL). They played their home games at the Comcast Arena at Everett in Everett.

The Raptors franchise was the relocated team previously known as the Kent Predators and later the Seattle Timberwolves.

As of 2012, the Everett Raptors are out of the IFL. The parent company filed for bankruptcy, and the team was not in the league in 2012–2013.

== History ==
The franchise was originally going to play in Wasilla, Alaska as the Arctic Predators, but complications between the ownership and the would-be head coach led to difficulty in obtaining a lease, so the IFL and the Arctic Predators split ways. However, the A-Preds did not fold immediately; they played that season in the American Indoor Football Association.

On January 10, 2011, the Kent Predators were sold to Jeffery Scott, who hired new head coach Keith Evans, just two days later. On April 13, the team was sold again, this time to Tom Dowling, changed the team's name to the Seattle Timberwovles while naming Mike Berry the team general manager, and Sean Ponder the team's new head coach.

On October 18, 2011, it was announced that the Timberwolves were moving to Everett, adopting the new Everett Raptors identity.

The Raptors were the second indoor football team to play in Everett, following the Everett Hawks of the National Indoor Football League and later the af2 which played from 2005 until 2007. A team called the Everett Destroyers was proposed for the IFL's inaugural 2009 season, but folded before ever playing a single down.

On July 30, 2012, the parent company, Northwest Pro Sports LLC, filed For Bankruptcy. The Everett Raptors are now out of IFL and did not play 2012–2013.

== Players of note ==
=== All-IFL players ===
The following Predators/Timberwolves/Raptors players were named to All-IFL teams:

- WR Andre Piper-Jordan (2)
- OL Vaughn Lesuma
- DL John Fields
- KR Mike Tatum

=== Awards and honors ===
The following is a list of all Predators/Timberwolves/Raptors players who have won league Awards

Season	Player	Position	Award
2010	John Fields	Defensive lineman	Defensive Player of the Year
2012	Mike Tatum	Kickoff returner	Special Teams Player of the Year

== Head coaches ==
Name	Term	Regular season				Playoffs		Awards
Name	Term	W	L	T	Win%	W	L	Awards
William McCarthy	2010	5	9	0	.357	0	0	
Keith Evans	2011	1	5	0	.167	0	0	
Sean Ponder	2011–2012	9	13	0	.409	0	0	

== Season-by-season results ==
Note: The finish, wins, losses, and ties columns list regular season results and exclude any postseason play.

League champions	Conference champions	Division champions	Wild card berth	League leader

Season	Team	League	Conference	Division	Regular season				Postseason results
Season	Team	League	Conference	Division	Finish	Wins	Losses	Ties	Postseason results
2010	2010	IFL	Intense	Pacific North	4th	5	9	0	
2011	2011	IFL	Intense	Pacific	3rd	5	9	0	
2012	2012	IFL	Intense		5th	5	9	0	
Totals						15	27	0	All-time regular season record (2010–2012)
Totals						0	0	-	All-time postseason record (2010–2012)
Totals						15	27	0	All-time regular season and postseason record (2010–2012)
