= Angel of the Winds Arena =

Indoor arena in Everett, Washington, U.S.

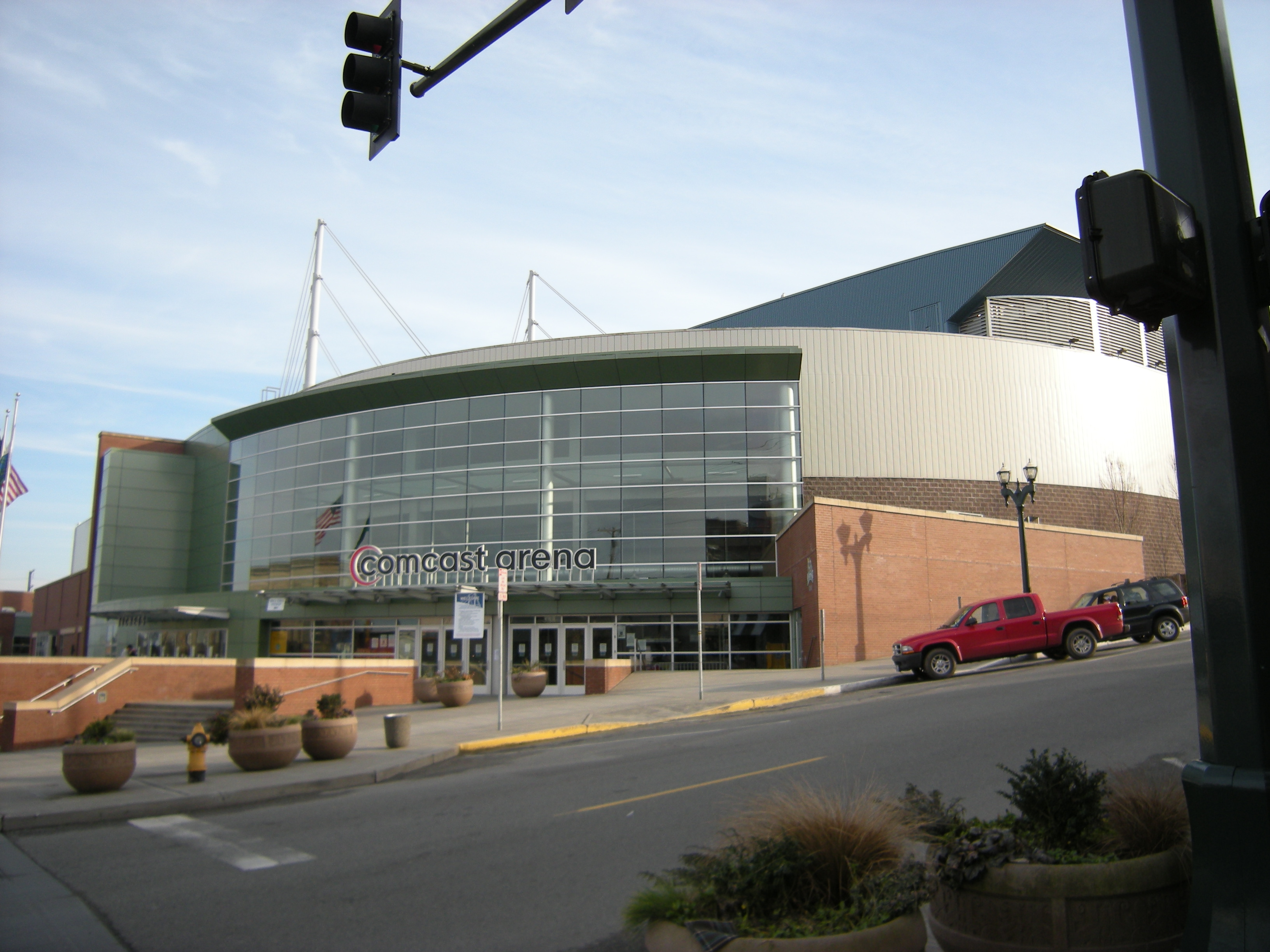
- The arena (then the Comcast Arena) pictured in 2009

- Location within Washington Location within the United States
- Former names: Everett Events Center (2003–2007); Comcast Arena at Everett (2007–2014); Xfinity Arena (2014–2017)
- Address: 2000 Hewitt Avenue
- Location: Everett, Washington, U.S.
- Coordinates: 47°58′43″N 122°12′13″W
- Owner: Everett Public Facilities District
- Operator: Oak View Group
- Capacity: Hockey: 8,149; Center stage concert: 10,000; End stage concert: 9,000

Construction
- Groundbreaking: April 23, 2002
- Opened: September 27, 2003
- Cost: $71.5 million ($125 million in 2025 dollars)
- Architects: LMN Architects; PBK Architects, Inc.
- Structural engineer: Magnusson Klemencic Associates
- Services engineer: Hermanson Co. LLP
- General contractor: PCL Construction

Tenant
- Everett Silvertips (WHL) (2003–present); Everett Hawks (NWFL/NIFL/AF2) (2004–2007); Everett Explosion (IBL) (2007); Washington Stealth (NLL) (2010–2013); Everett Raptors (IFL) (2012); Seattle Storm (WNBA) (2019, 2021); Washington Wolfpack (AFL/AF1) (2024–present)

Website
- angelofthewindsarena.com

Angel of the Winds Arena (originally known as Everett Events Center) is a multi-purpose sports arena complex in Everett, Washington, United States, designed and developed by the Everett Public Facilities District. It opened in October 2003 and primarily serves as the home of the Everett Silvertips of the Western Hockey League. The arena has 8,149 seats in its ice hockey configuration and 10,000 for concerts and other events. The naming rights to the venue were sold to Comcast in 2007 and subsequently to Angel of the Winds Casino Resort in 2017. The venue has hosted a variety of concerts and other performances, including the Ringling Brothers Circus, Disney on Ice, the Harlem Globetrotters, and Sesame Street Live.

The venue also hosted 2008 Skate America, a three-day ice-skating championship that is part of the ISU Grand Prix of Figure Skating. The event set an attendance record for Skate America and the arena was selected as host for the 2018 edition and 2026 edition, the latter of which set another attendance record.

== History ==
Construction on the arena began in April 2002 after the demolition of two city blocks in downtown Everett, which included several historic buildings along Hewitt Avenue from the early 20th century. The Everett Historical Commission refused to grant waivers for the demolition, but were overruled by the Everett City Council. The arena, named the Everett Events Center, opened to the public on September 27, 2003, for a preview event attended by approximately 4,000 people. It cost $71.5 million to construct.

The Everett Events Center hosted its first Western Hockey League game on October 4, 2003, between the Everett Silvertips and Prince George Cougars. The new arena booked several events that had traditionally used the Tacoma Dome, including Disney on Ice and the Harlem Globetrotters.

== Tenants and events ==
In 2016, the arena served as the host for the 2016 Pacific Rim Gymnastics Championships. It also hosted WWE's flagship TV show Monday Night Raw on February 17, 2020, and December 2, 2024. It also hosted All Elite Wrestling's flagship TV show Dynamite on May 15, 2024.

=== Hockey ===
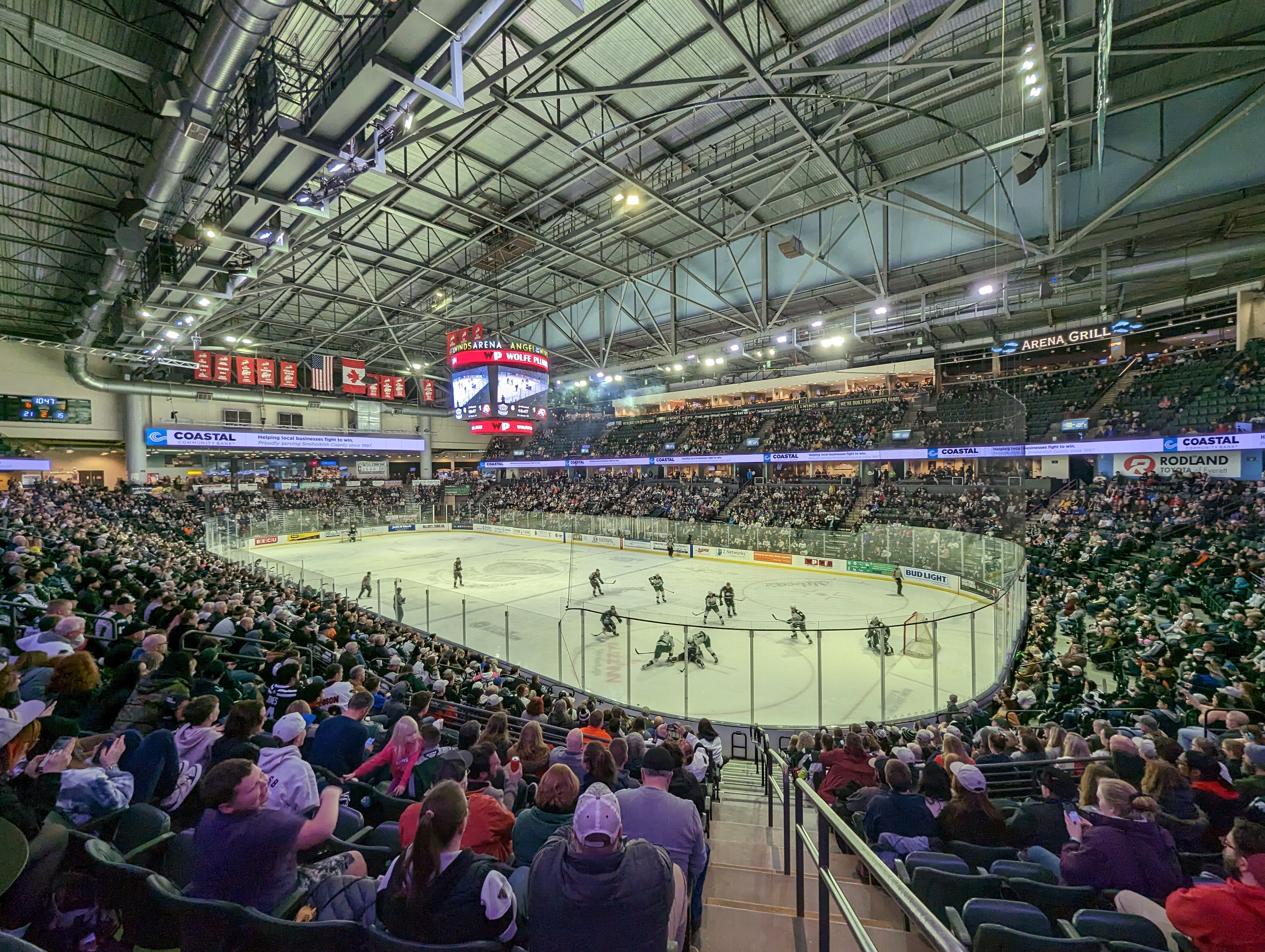
An Everett Silvertips regular season game at Angel of the Winds Arena in 2023

Angel of the Winds Arena is the home of the Everett Silvertips, a Western Hockey League franchise. In their first season (2003–04), the Everett Silvertips won the WHL Western Conference Championship.

The arena also hosted a preseason games between National Hockey League (NHL) teams several times, beginning in September 2009 between the Tampa Bay Lightning and Phoenix Coyotes. The game—the first between NHL teams in the region since 1997—was played in front of a sellout crowd of 7,281 spectators. The Seattle Kraken played a preseason game at Angel of the Winds Arena on October 1, 2021. Played as part of a regional tour prior to the inaugural season, the Kraken won 2–1 in overtime against the Edmonton Oilers.

The first American Hockey League regular season game to be played in Everett was between Kraken affiliates Coachella Valley Firebirds and the Calgary Wranglers on October 28, 2022.

=== Basketball ===
The arena was home to the International Basketball League's Everett Explosion for one season in 2007 before they moved to Monroe and were renamed the Snohomish County Explosion, where they played until 2010.

The Seattle Storm of the Women's National Basketball Association announced that it would play five home games during its 2019 season in Everett, while the rest are played at their temporary home in Seattle, the Hec Edmundson Pavilion on the University of Washington campus. The Storm played their season opener in Everett on May 25, 2019, using the same floor that had previously been installed at KeyArena. The team planned to return in 2020 for eight games in Everett, but due to the COVID-19 pandemic, all WNBA games were moved to Bradenton, Florida. The Storm played all 16 home games of their 2021 season at Angel of the Winds Arena with up to 2,000 fans allowed to attend per the state's COVID-19 reopening guidelines.

The Washington State Cougars men's basketball team is scheduled to play a neutral site game at the arena on November 18, 2026, against the Hawaii Rainbow Warriors.

=== Arena football ===
The Washington Wolfpack of Arena Football One currently play in the Angel of the Winds Arena Which makes them the third arena football team to do so. The Everett Hawks played for one season in the National Indoor Football League and one season in af2 before folding in 2007. The Everett Raptors played for one season in the Indoor Football League in 2012.

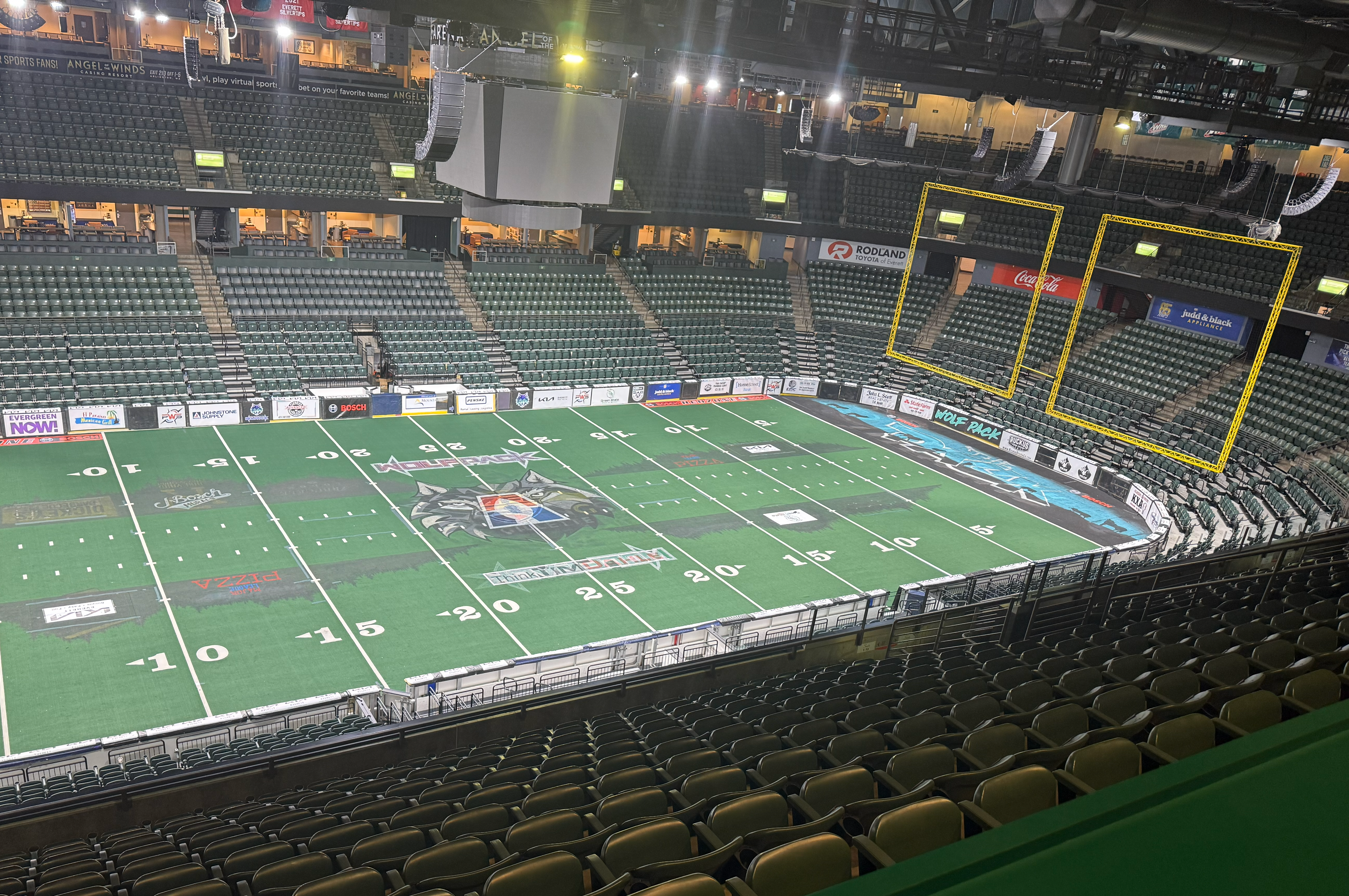
Angel of the Winds Arena in Everett, Washington laid out in its arena football configuration prior to a Washington Wolfpack game in Arena Football One.

=== Lacrosse ===
In 2010, Comcast Arena became home to the Washington Stealth of the National Lacrosse League. The franchise was previously known as the San Jose Stealth, and before that the Albany Attack. After four seasons in Everett, the Washington Stealth were relocated to British Columbia in 2014.

=== Ice skating ===
The venue hosted 2008 Skate America, a three-day ice-skating championship featuring world-class skaters. The events were both nationally and internationally televised on NBC. It was the first event of the 2008–09 ISU Grand Prix of Figure Skating, a senior-level international invitational competition. A total of 29,477 spectators watched events at the arena and set the attendance record for Skate America. Angel of the Winds Arena hosted 2018 Skate America and drew 16,863 spectators over three days. A third edition, 2026 Skate America, was hosted in November 2026 and drew 29,598 spectators at four sessions—a tournament record.

=== Curling ===
In 2017, the arena, then known as Xfinity Arena, was host to the USA Men's and Women's Curling National Championships. The men's championship was won by 2018 Winter Olympics gold medalists Team John Shuster, while Team Jamie Sinclair captured the women's crown.

=== Banked track roller derby ===
Angel of the Winds Arena is also home to the Tilted Thunder Rail Birds, a Seattle-based, all-female, banked track roller derby league.

=== Tennis ===
On February 7–8, 2020 Angel of the Winds Arena hosted USTA Fed Cup qualifying event with competing teams USA and Latvia.

=== Rodeo ===
Several bull riding tours have held events at the arena. The Professional Bull Riders's premier series, the Unleash the Beast Series, made its Everett debut on April 6, 2022. It returned in 2023 and 2024.

== Other uses ==
Angel of the Winds Arena is used for annual high school and community college graduation ceremonies through agreements with several local school districts.

The arena hosted a campaign rally for then-presidential candidate Donald Trump on August 30, 2016. He spoke for 48 minutes in front of an estimated 9,184 people in attendance; the event cost $79,000 in extra policing and other staffing, which was partially recouped by the rental fee.

On April 1, 2020, the arena opened as a COVID-19 quarantine center with 150 beds amid the coronavirus pandemic. The quarantine center was meant for patients with COVID-19 and are unable to self-isolate or quarantine at home.

== Conference Center ==
The Edward D. Hansen Conference Center is a three-story addition to the arena that cost US$12 million to construct. The facility includes a 11,385-square-foot (1,057.7 m^{2}) ballroom that is capable of accommodating 800 guests. In addition to the ballroom, the conference center has three executive meeting rooms available as private meeting space. The conference center hosts approximately 200 events annually. It is also home to a public art collection, which includes artwork from the Pilchuck Glass Collection.

== Ice rink ==
The Community Ice Rink is an NHL regulation 200' x 85' ice rink that is located inside Angel of the Winds Arena. It is a public ice skating rink, which is used for public skating, local hockey leagues, figure skating, instructional sessions, and much more. Currently the rink is open year-round, and has the versatility to transform into a 57,000-square-foot (5,300 m^{2}) space with the capability to host trade shows, expositions, consumer shows and special events.

== Concerts ==
List of Concerts
- Lynyrd Skynyrd – February 6, 2004, and December 16, 2005
- KUBE 93.3's Birthday Bash – March 27, 2004
- Rod Stewart – April 3, 2004
- tobyMac & The Diverse City Band – May 22, 2004, with Third Day
- American Idol Live! – July 17, 2004, August 23, 2005 and July 8, 2011
- The Cure – August 31, 2004
- Scorpions – October 21, 2004, with Tesla and Keith Emerson
- The Rock & Soul Revue – October 23, 2004
- Green Day – November 16, 2004, with New Found Glory and Sugarcult
- Bette Midler – December 7, 2004
- Dolly Parton – December 19, 2004, with The Grascals
- Cher – January 26, 2005, with The Village People
- Duran Duran – March 9, 2005, with Ima Robot and September 23, 2011, with The Neon Trees
- The Taste of Chaos Tour – March 26, 2005, April 2, 2006 and February 15, 2007
- Velvet Revolver – April 22, 2005
- The Wiggles – April 24, 2005 (2 shows), March 16, 2007 (2 shows), July 17, 2009 (2 shows) and October 9, 2010 (2 shows)
- The Honda Civic Tour – April 30, 2005, and May 15, 2006
- Oasis – September 9, 2005, with Jet and Kasabian
- Santana – September 20, 2005, with Robert Randolph and the Family Band
- Audioslave – September 28, 2005, with Seether and 30 Seconds to Mars
- The Gaither Homecoming – October 7, 2005
- Def Leppard – November 8, 2005, with Bryan Adams
- Steven Curtis Chapman – December 7, 2005
- Kanye West – December 10, 2005, and December 10, 2007, with Keyshia Cole and Fantasia Barrino
- Martina McBride – July 16, 2006, with Mark Wills and August 4, 2007, with Little Big Town
- Juan Gabriel – September 24, 2006
- James Blunt – November 6, 2006
- The Barenaked Ladies – November 26, 2006, with Mike Doughty's Band
- Dierks Bentley – December 1, 2006, with Miranda Lambert and The Randy Rogers Band and April 21, 2012, with Jerrod Niemann and The Eli Young Band
- Panic! at the Disco – December 3, 2006, with The Bloc Party, Jack's Mannequin and Cobra Starship
- Guns N' Roses – December 10, 2006, with Helmet and The Sebastian Bach Band
- The Dukes of Dixieland – January 20, 2007
- The Blue Man Group – February 2, 2007, with Mike Relm and January 25, 2008, with Mike Relm
- The Doodlebops – February 11, 2007
- The Panic Channel – February 18, 2007, with Rock Star Supernova
- The Newsboys – March 25, 2007, with Kutless and Stellar Kart and April 15, 2010
- KBKS 106.1's Girl's Night Out – May 13, 2007
- Hilary Duff – August 6, 2007, with Lifehouse
- Mannheim Steamroller – December 2, 2007
- Switchfoot & Relient K – December 3, 2007, with Ruth
- Tool – December 4, 2007, with Trans Am
- KNDD 107.7 The End's Deck The Hall Ball – December 6, 2007
- The Jonas Brothers – February 5, 2008, with Rooney
- Gary Valenciano – June 15, 2008
- Rock Band Live – October 14, 2008
- Neil Young – October 21, 2008, with Death Cab for Cutie
- Celtic Thunder – December 7, 2008, and October 30, 2010
- Sarah Brightman – December 14, 2008, with Mario Frangoulis
- Disturbed – January 23, 2009, with Sevendust and Skindred
- Barry Manilow – March 15, 2009
- Il Divo – June 2, 2009
- ZZ Top – November 23, 2009
- Quidam – March 16–20, 2010
- The Zac Brown Band – March 21, 2010, with Sonia Leigh, Levi Lowrey and Nic Cowan
- Thousand Foot Krutch – April 9, 2010
- Carrie Underwood – May 29, 2010, with Craig Morgan and Sons of Sylvia
- Justin Bieber – July 13, 2010, with Sean Kingston and The Stunners
- Jimmy Needham – April 1, 2011
- Leeland – April 2, 2011
- KISS – June 23, 2011, with Bad City
- USC 14th Anniversary Concert – June 24, 2011
- The Avett Brothers – July 15, 2011, with Jessica Lea Mayfield
- Sugarland – July 18, 2011, with Sara Bareilles
- Alan Jackson & The Strayhorns – August 19, 2011
- Michael W. Smith – December 5, 2011
- Sonu Nigam – June 10, 2012
- The Smashing Pumpkins – October 10, 2012, with Anberlin
- The Fresh Beat Band – November 10, 2012
- Eric Church – November 13, 2012, with Justin Moore and Kip Moore
- The Gigantour – July 30, 2013
- KBKS 106.1's Jingle Ball – December 8, 2013
- Celtic Woman – March 25, 2014
- Gloria Trevi – April 19, 2014, with Carlito Olivero
- The Musica Corrido Fest – May 18, 2014
- OneRepublic – June 12, 2014, with The Script and American Authors
- Demi Lovato – October 2, 2014, with Christina Perri and MKTO
- Phillip Phillips – October 21, 2014, with Christian Burghardt
- R. Kelly – February 7, 2015
- for KING & COUNTRY – November 3, 2019 and December 2, 2023
- Foreigner - September 14, 2021
- Playboi Carti - November 14, 2021
- Judas Priest - March 9, 2022
- MercyMe - April 9, 2022
- Justin Moore - May 12, 2022
- Arijit Singh - June 4, 2022
- Vice Ganda - July 8, 2022
- Rock with RAAJA - July 9, 2022
- Casting Crowns - October 1, 2022
- Chris Tomlin - November 9, 2022
- Walker Hayes - November 12, 2022
- Mannheim Steamrollers - December 16, 2023
- Rockzilla Tour - March 5, 2023 with Papa Roach and Falling in Reverse
- Anirudh Live - April 14, 2023
- Megadeth – April 26, 2023 - with Bullet For My Valentine
- Shinedown: The Revolutions Tour – May 7, 2023, with Three Days Grace and Ashes To New
- NASAA- Rockstar DSP Live in Concert - July 15, 2023
- Kapil Sharma - July 21, 2023
- Eslabon Armado - August 26, 2023
- Sid Sriram - September 17, 2023
- Jon Pardi - October 28, 2023
- Riley Green - May 17, 2024, with Tracy Lawrence and Ella Langley
- Shreya Ghoshal - June 21, 2024
