= Rio Rancho Events Center =

Multi-purpose arena in New Mexico, U.S.

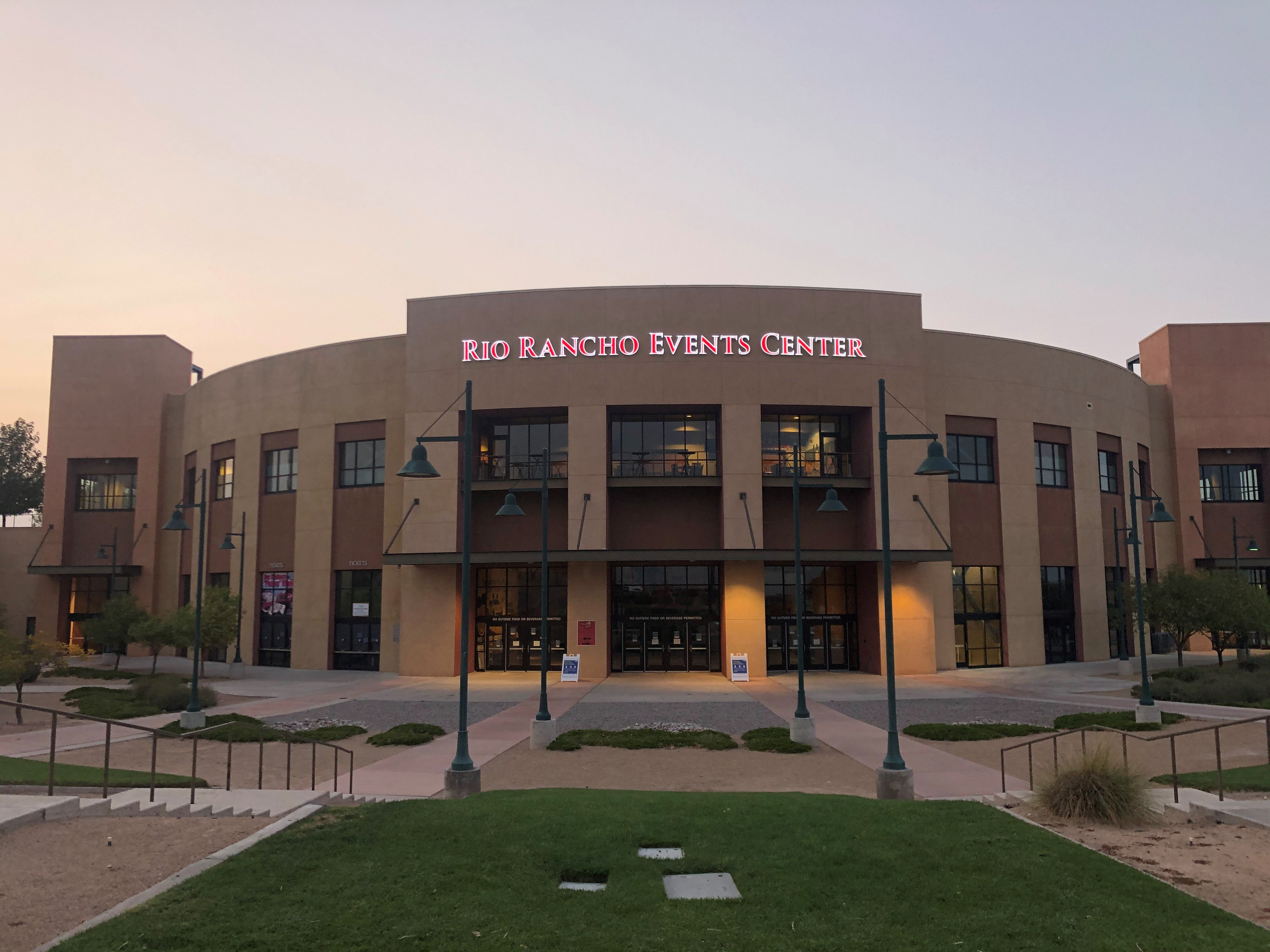
- Rio Rancho Events Center at night
- Interactive map of Rio Rancho Events Center
- Former names: Santa Ana Star Center (2006-2020)
- Address: 3001 Civic Center Drive
- Location: Rio Rancho, New Mexico, U.S.
- Coordinates: 35°18′37.05″N 106°41′8.98″W
- Owner: City of Rio Rancho
- Operator: Global Spectrum
- Capacity: Ice Hockey: 6,000; Rodeos: 6,000; Concerts: 7,500

Construction
- Groundbreaking: June 14, 2005
- Opened: October 21, 2006
- Cost: $47 million USD ($75.1 million in 2025 dollars)
- Architect: Sink Combs Dethlefs
- Project manager: Frew Nations Group
- Structural engineers: Martin & Martin
- General contractor: Hunt/Bradbury Stamm

Tenants
- New Mexico Scorpions (CHL) (2006–2009); New Mexico Wildcats (AIFA) (2008–2009); New Mexico Mustangs (NAHL) (2010–2012); New Mexico Thunderbirds (NBA D-League) (2010–2011); New Mexico Stars (IFL/LSFL/AIF) (2012–2014, 2016); New Mexico Runners (M2) (2018–present); Duke City Gladiators (IFL) (2021–2024); New Mexico Goatheads (ECHL) (2026–present)

Website
- rioranchoeventscenter.com

Rio Rancho Events Center is a 7,000-seat multi-purpose arena in Rio Rancho, New Mexico, a city located near Albuquerque. The arena is located near the intersection of Unser Boulevard and Paseo del Volcan. It is part of a larger "City Center" project, which also includes a new city hall. The multipurpose facility can host concert settings in various capacities, hockey, basketball, indoor football, family shows, rodeos, trade shows and flexible set-ups to accommodate any event.

Santa Ana Star Casino purchased the naming rights to the arena in a five-year, $2.5 million deal signed in July 2006. The arena was previously known as Santa Ana Star Center. The contract was not renewed in 2020, resulting in the arena changing its name back to Rio Rancho Events Center.

The arena was completed at a cost of $47 million USD and opened on October 21, 2006. The first sports event in the arena was a hockey game on October 27, 2006, with the New Mexico Scorpions falling to the Arizona Sundogs 3–1 in front of a sellout crowd.

In April 2009, the city of Rio Rancho awarded Global Spectrum as the management company for the Arena. In 2019, that contract was renewed.

The Events Center is currently home to the New Mexico Runners of the Major Arena Soccer League 2. The center was formerly home to the New Mexico Mustangs of the North American Hockey League, the New Mexico Scorpions of the Central Hockey League, the New Mexico Stars of the Indoor Football League/Lone Star Football League, the New Mexico Wildcats of the American Indoor Football Association, New Mexico Thunderbirds, of the NBA Development League, and a venue for World Wrestling Entertainment. The arena also hosted a campaign rally for President Donald Trump on September 16, 2019.
