= Oklahoma Defenders =

Former professional indoor football team

Logo

General information
- Founded: 2012
- Folded: 2014
- Headquartered: Tulsa Convention Center in Tulsa, Oklahoma
- Colors: Navy, Scarlet, White
- Mascot: Billie the Regulator

Personnel
- Owner: Lamar Baker

Team history
- Oklahoma Defenders (2012–2014)

Home fields
- Tulsa Convention Center (2012–2014)

League / conference affiliations
- American Professional Football League (2012) Champions Professional Indoor Football League (2013–2014)

Playoff appearances (1)
- APFL: 2012

The Oklahoma Defenders were a professional indoor football team and a charter member of the Champions Professional Indoor Football League (CPIFL). Based in Tulsa, Oklahoma, the Defenders played their home games at the Cox Business Center.

It was announced in August 2014, that the team would go dark and cease all operation for the 2015 season, with the goal to return in the 2016 season. Many expect the team to fold and not return for the 2016 season.

The Defenders are the second arena/indoor team based in Tulsa, following the Tulsa Talons which played in arenafootball2 from the league's inaugural season in 2000 until its final season of 2009, and later in the Arena Football League from 2010 until 2011, after which the Talons moved to San Antonio.

== History ==
The Defenders began play in 2012 as a member of the American Professional Football League. The Defenders experienced immediate success, finishing the regular season with a 9–3 record, tied for second place with the Council Bluffs Express. However, the Defenders would get the #3 seed because of the Express holding the head-to-head tiebreaker. In the teams' first-round playoff game, the Defenders lost to the Express 37–32.

For the 2013 season, the Defenders played in the Champions Professional Indoor Football League. They posted a 3–9 record in their inaugural season in the CPIFL. The team's sophomore season in 2014 in the CPIFL was not much better with a duplicate 3–9 record.

It was announced in August 2014, that the team would go dark and cease all operation for the 2015 season, with the goal to return in the 2016 season.

== Final roster ==
Oklahoma Defenders roster
Quarterbacks: 8 Brady May; 12 Zach Rasmussen; Running backs: 42 Jamario Thomas; 2 Kingjack Washington; Wide receivers: 4 Isaiah Anderson; 1 Hubert Anyiam; 20 John Goodlett; 5 Jeff Hughley; 6 Patrick Jones; 23 Matt Rice	Offensive linemen: 71 Michael Billingsly; 95 Dalvin Brown; 69 Terry Johnson II; — Jarrad Hernandez; 72 David Lazenby; Defensive linemen: 46 Ki'Ounta Cathey; 54 Victor Clore; 51 Cordero Moore; 44 Jared St. John; 91 Faafeti Te'o	Linebackers: 52 Austen Brooner; 56 Ronnell Lewis; Defensive backs: 21 Bobby Blackshire; 24 Delaney Dobard; 27 Sam Proctor; 22 Norris Wrenn; 43 Niko Wright; Kickers: 94 Tommy Frevert	Injured Reserve: Currently vacant; Transfer List: 21 Chika Madu DB; Refuse to Report: Currently vacant; Roster updated May 15, 2014; Transactions; 28 Active, 1 Inactive

== Season-by-season ==
Season records
Season	W	L	T	Finish	Playoff results
Oklahoma Defenders (APFL)
2012	9	3	0	3rd League	Lost semi-final (Council Bluffs)
Oklahoma Defenders (CPIFL)
2013	3	9	0	8th League	--
2014	4	8	0	7th League	--
Totals	16	20	0	(including playoffs)	

== 2014 ==
=== Season schedule ===
2014 Schedule
Week	Date	Kickoff	Opponent	Results	
Week	Date	Kickoff	Opponent	Final score	Team record
1	March 1 (Sat)	7:05pm	Kansas Koyotes	72-6	1-0
2	March 8 (Sat)	7:05pm	@Dodge City Law	56-49	2-0
3	March 16 (Sun)	3:05pm	Wichita Wild	44-50	2-1
4	March 22 (Sat)	7:05pm	Sioux City Bandits	46-33	2-2
5	Bye				
6	April 5 (Sat)	7:05pm	@Lincoln Haymakers	73-61	3-2
7	April 12 (Sat)	7:05pm	Bloomington Edge	58-59	3-3
8	April 19 (Sat)	7:05pm	@Kansas Koyotes	64-55	4-3
9	April 26 (Sat)	7:05pm	@Wichita Wild	37-67	4-4
10	May 3 (Sat)	7:05pm	@Sioux City Bandits	52-60	4-5
11	May 10 (Sat)	7:30pm	Dodge City Law	33-56	4-6
12	May 17 (Sat)	7:05pm	Salina Bombers	40-60	4-7
13	Bye				
14	May 31 (Sat)	7:05pm	@Kansas Koyotes	63-75	4-8

== Past seasons ==
=== Season schedule ===
2013 Schedule
Week	Date	Kickoff	Opponent	Results	
Week	Date	Kickoff	Opponent	Final score	Team record
1	March 9 (Sat)	7:30pm	Wichita Wild	26-70	0-1
2	March 16 (Sat)	7:30pm	@Kansas Koyotes	62-40	1-1
3	Bye				
4	March 30 (Sat)	7:30pm	@Kansas City Renegades	47-54	1-2
5	April 6 (Sat)	7:30pm	@Salina Bombers	31-50	1-3
6	April 14 (Sun)	7:30pm	Mid-Missouri Outlaws	36-34	2-3
7	April 20 (Sat)	7:30pm	Bloomington Edge	39-44	2-4
8	April 26 (Fri)	7:05pm	@Lincoln Haymakers	40-46	2-5
9	May 4 (Sat)	7:05pm	@Wichita Wild	7-73	2-6
10	May 11 (Sat)	7:30pm	Kansas Koyotes	48-20	3-6
11	May 18 (Sat)	7:30pm	Kansas City Renegades	28-65	3-7
12	May 26 (Sun)	4:30pm	@Omaha Beef	21-59	3-8
13	Bye				
14	June 8 (Sat)	7:30pm	Salina Bombers	34-46	3-9

=== 2012 ===
==== Season schedule ====
2012 Schedule
Date	Time	Opponent	Location	Score
March 24	7:05 PM	@ Sioux City Bandits	Tyson Events Center, Sioux City, IA	L 40–70
March 31	7:05 PM	Council Bluffs Express	Expo Square Pavilion, Tulsa, OK	W 56–41
April 7	7:05 PM	Cheyenne Warriors	Expo Square Pavilion, Tulsa, OK	W 54–9
April 21	7:05 PM	Sioux City Bandits	Expo Square Pavilion, Tulsa, OK	L 29–31
April 28	7:05 PM	@ Kansas Koyotes	Landon Arena, Topeka, KS	W 67–20
May 12	7:05 PM	@ Springfield Wolfpack	Mediacom Ice Park, Springfield, MO	W 58–22
May 19	7:05 PM	@ Colorado Lightning	Colorado Sports and Events Center, Monument, CO	W 2-0 (forfeit)
May 26	7:05 PM	Springfield Wolfpack	Expo Square Pavilion, Tulsa, OK	W 74–2
June 2	7:05 PM	Kansas Koyotes	Expo Square Pavilion, Tulsa, OK	W 48–19
June 16	7:05 PM	@ Mid-Missouri Outlaws	Mathewson Exhibition Center, Sedalia, MO	W 75–10
June 23	7:05 PM	@ Council Bluffs Express	Mid-America Center, Council Bluffs, IA	L 39–62
June 30	7:05 PM	Mid-Missouri Outlaws	Tulsa Convention Center, Tulsa, OK	W 88–41
July 7	7:05 PM	@ Council Bluffs Express - APFL Playoffs	Mid-America Center, Council Bluffs, IA	L 32–37
