= 2014 Champions Professional Indoor Football League season =

- League: Champions Professional Indoor Football League
- Sport: Indoor football
- Duration: February 28 – June 7

Regular season
- Season MVP: Rocky Hinds (Wichita)
- runners-up: Kansas Koyotes

2014 Champions Bowl
- Champions: Wichita Wild
- Runners-up: Sioux City Bandits
- Finals MVP: Rocky Hinds

Champions Professional Indoor Football League seasons
- ← 2013

The 2014 Champions Indoor Football season was the second and final season of the Champions Professional Indoor Football League (CPIFL). With players like Clemson's #20 Antonio Clay with the Kansas Koyotes. It was the result of the brainchild of Sioux City Bandits owner Bob Scott. The regular season began on Friday, February 28 when the Lincoln Haymakers lost to the Wichita Wild in Nebraska, 62–10. It finished on Saturday, June 7. The league champion was the Wichita Wild, who defeated the Sioux City Bandits by a score of 46–41 in the 2014 Champions Bowl. The season MVP was Rocky Hinds of the Wichita Wild. The CPIFL merged with the Lone Star Football League over the offseason, to create Champions Indoor Football (CIF).

== Standings ==
Champions Professional Indoor Football League
	W	L	PCT	PF	PA
y-Wichita Wild	10	2	.833	611	371
x–Sioux City Bandits	9	3	.750	702	558
x-Salina Bombers	8	4	.667	564	482
x-Dodge City Law	8	4	.667	560	445
Lincoln Haymakers	5	7	.417	504	559
Bloomington Edge	5	7	.417	586	667
Oklahoma Defenders	4	8	.333	625	644
Omaha Beef	4	8	.333	561	562
Kansas Koyotes	1	11	.083	371	673

y – clinched top overall seed

x – clinched playoff berth

== Playoffs ==
Semifinals
3	Salina	37
2	Sioux City	66
4	Dodge City	31
1	Wichita	33

2014 Champions Bowl
2	Sioux City	41
1	Wichita	46
