= Wichita Aviators =

Indoor football team

Wichita Aviators
| Founded | 2005 |
| Defunct | 2006 |
| Arenas | Kansas Coliseum; Wichita Ice Center |
| Based in | Wichita, Kansas |
| Colors | Blue, white, black |
| League | American Professional Football League |

The Wichita Aviators were a professional indoor football team that played in the American Professional Football League (APFL). The Aviators played their home games in Britt Brown Arena at the Kansas Coliseum during the team's first season (2005). In 2006, the Aviators played their home games at the Wichita Ice Center in Wichita, Kansas. The Wichita Aviators and Kansas Koyotes were both owned by APFL founder Ralph Adams. Carl Caldwell was the head coach of the Aviators, and Mike McCoy was the General Manager.

== 2005 APFL season ==
The Wichita Aviators opened their inaugural 2005 APFL season at home against the Iowa Blackhawks. The Aviators were defeated 40-35 in their first game, as costly turnovers and a 26-point second quarter scoring outburst by the Blackhawks contributed to the loss. Former Kansas State Wildcat quarterback Jonathan Beasley completed 9 of 20 passes for 133 yards, with 2 touchdowns and 2 interceptions. One of Beasley's touchdowns was a 46-yard completion to wide receiver Chris Williams, and the other was a 7-yard toss to running back Carl Richardson. Beasley also produced on the ground, scoring two rushing touchdowns. Chris Williams was the Aviators' leading receiver for the opening game with 72 receiving yards. Wichita would lose its next three games, starting the season in disappointing fashion with a record of 0 wins and 4 losses. However, the Aviators rebounded to win five consecutive games, and eventually qualified for the 2005 APFL playoffs after defeating the Missouri Minutemen 49-14 in Sedalia, MO on June 25. In this game, 28 unanswered points were scored by the Aviators in the first quarter. John Wise started at quarterback for the Aviators, and scored the initial touchdown of the game on a 1-yard plunge. Wise later added another rushing touchdown, and completed touchdown passes of 26 and 22 yards to 6'5" wide receiver Donald Payne. Earl Henry and Carl Richardson made an impact on special teams, as both players returned missed field goals for scores. Following the win at Missouri, and a Nebraska Bears loss to the Iowa Blackhawks, the Aviators clinched the third seed in the playoffs with a regular season record of 5 wins and 5 losses. Wichita lost their semifinal playoff game 50-42 to the Iowa Blackhawks at the Mid-America Center in Council Bluffs, IA.

2005 Schedule and Scores

| Date | Opponent | Win (W)/ Loss (L) | Score |
|---|---|---|---|
| 04/23/2005 | Iowa Blackhawks | L | 40-35 |
| 04/30/2005 | at Kansas Koyotes | L | 39-6 |
| 05/14/2005 | at Nebraska Bears | L | 41-40 |
| 05/21/2005 | Kansas Koyotes | L | 62-27 |
| 05/28/2005 | Kansas Storm | W | 91-6 |
| 06/04/2005 | at Iowa Blackhawks | W | 27-24 |
| 06/11/2005 | Missouri Minutemen | W | 62-18 |
| 06/18/2005 | Nebraska Bears | W | 47-36 |
| 06/25/2005 | at Missouri Minutemen | W | 49-14 |
| 07/02/2005 | Kansas Koyotes | L | 30-24 |
| Playoffs | at Iowa Blackhawks | L | 50-42 |

== 2006 APFL season ==
The Wichita Aviators opened the 2006 season with a 50-43 win over the Kansas Koyotes on April 8, 2006 at the Wichita Ice Center. Former Wyoming University running back Idris Elias carried the ball 22 times for 75 yards and 5 touchdowns in a very physical game against the Koyotes. This was the Koyotes' first loss in team history, as the Topeka, Kansas–based franchise had won 31 straight games in the previous three seasons. The Aviators' next game resulted in a convincing 63-6 win at home against the Nebraska Wildcats. Both John Wise and Matt Kelly saw action at quarterback against the Wildcats. Wise scored one 5-yard rushing touchdown, and threw for another 6-yard score to Donald Payne. Kelly completed a 22-yard touchdown to Payne, and found wide receiver Reggie Smith alone in the right corner of the end zone for a 4-yard score on a bootleg play that was designed for Kelly to run the ball. Aviators' wide receiver Jordan Taylor had touchdown runs of 4 and 26 yards, and running back Phillip Baron added touchdown runs of 1 and 4 yards. Several big plays were made on defense and special teams for the Aviators. Defensive back JJ McCoy intercepted the Wildcats' first pass attempt, and Earl Henry flattened a Wildcats' ball carrier in the open field during the second quarter. On special teams, a safety was scored when defensive lineman Ricky Gottschalk blocked a field goal out of the end zone. After the easy home win over the Nebraska Wildcats, the Aviators traveled to Council Bluffs, IA and defeated the Iowa Blackhawks 51-48 for their first road win of the 2006 season. The Aviators entered the fourth quarter trailing the Blackhawks by 17 points, but linebacker Earl Henry eventually swung momentum in the Aviators' direction when he weaved his way to the end zone on a 41-yard interception return to decrease the deficit. Phillip Baron's 2-yard touchdown run as time expired in the fourth quarter silenced the crowd and gave the Aviators an emphatic victory in what proved to be a very exciting game. John Wise completed 13 of his 23 pass attempts for 149 yards and 1 touchdown. Donald Payne hauled in Wise's lone touchdown pass of 43 yards when he made a leaping catch in the end zone over two Blackhawks defenders. Payne finished the night with 4 receptions for 71 yards. Chris Williams recorded 7 receptions for 58 yards and 1 touchdown. Williams' touchdown reception occurred on a gadget play when Jordan Taylor motioned across the formation and received a handoff prior to tossing a 2-yard touchdown pass to Williams in the back of the end zone. The Aviators continued their winning ways after the victory in Iowa, and were undefeated with a first place record of 7-0 before meeting the Kansas Koyotes for a second time in the 2006 season. On June 10, 2006, the Koyotes handed Wichita their first loss of the season, beating the Aviators 37-34 at Landon Arena in Topeka, Kansas. Idris Elias rushed for 52 yards and 2 touchdowns on 17 carries, Reggie Smith snagged a 33-yard touchdown pass from John Wise, and defensive back Jess Langvardt returned a fumble 18 yards for a touchdown in the Aviators' loss to the Koyotes. The Koyotes' win placed them in a tie with the Aviators for first place in the regular season standings. The next week, the Aviators played at home against the Iowa Blackhawks in a tight game that took more than four quarters to determine a winner. Earl Henry made a diving interception and returned the ball 49 yards for what appeared to be a game-winning touchdown in the final seconds of the fourth quarter. However, the head linesman ruled Henry down at the Aviators' 1 yard line, and no touchdown was awarded at the end of regulation. The Aviators would go on to lose the game 50-47 in overtime. Reggie Smith scored on a 10-yard run and 47-yard kick return, Idris Elias had rushing touchdowns of 1, 31, and 3 yards, and Matt Kelly completed a 16-yard touchdown pass to Donald Payne in the frustrating home defeat. After the close loss at home to Iowa, the Aviators dropped to second place in the standings with only a few weeks remaining in the regular season. A third regular season meeting between the Aviators and Koyotes occurred on Saturday July 15, 2006 at Landon Arena in Topeka, Kansas. The Aviators defeated the Koyotes 55-44 in a heated contest. Aviators' quarterback Matt Kelly completed 11 of his 16 pass attempts for 127 yards and 4 touchdowns. Reggie Smith had a big game, hauling in 6 receptions for 81 yards and 3 touchdowns. Idris Elias scored 3 touchdowns on the ground while rushing for 69 yards. Defensively, Earl Henry and defensive back Orlandis Williams each had interceptions. Antoine Williams led the Aviators' defense with 10 tackles, and Henry tallied 9 tackles. On special teams, Ziya Gunnay kicked two key field goals for the Aviators. An on-field melee ensued upon completion of the game when Kansas Koyotes head coach Jim Green was punched after grabbing and pushing Wichita Aviators wide receiver Donald Payne. The skirmish was reviewed by league commissioner Darcy Childs, and suspensions were issued to both Green and Payne. The tough win gave the Aviators a 2-1 series advantage over the Koyotes. Ultimately, this victory secured a first-place finish in the final APFL regular season standings for the Aviators, while the Koyotes dropped to second place. As a result of the first-place finish, the Aviators earned the right to host the APFL championship game in Wichita, KS on July 29, 2006. Wichita finished the 2006 regular season with 11 wins and 2 losses.

=== 2006 APFL playoffs ===
The Kansas Koyotes defeated the Iowa Blackhawks in the first round semi-final playoff game, and the Koyotes were scheduled to play the championship game against the top seeded Aviators in Wichita on July 29. However, the APFL unexpectedly announced that the championship game would be moved to Topeka, Kansas. Players, coaches, and staff from the Aviators viewed the league's decision to move the championship game from Wichita to Topeka as unfair and unprofessional since the top seeded playoff team always hosted the APFL championship per league rules. Members of the APFL league office refused to let Wichita host the championship even after Aviators' general manager Mike McCoy contacted the league office demanding that the game be played in Wichita as originally scheduled. Aviators' players unanimously voted to forfeit playing the championship game if it was not held in Wichita. APFL commissioner Darcy Childs and league owner Ralph Adams decided to award the championship to the Koyotes, and the 2006 APFL championship game was never played.

2006 Schedule and Scores

| Date | Opponent | Win (W)/Loss (L) | Score |
|---|---|---|---|
| 04/08/2006 | Kansas Koyotes | W | 50-43 |
| 04/22/2006 | Nebraska Wildcats | W | 63-6 |
| 04/29/2006 | at Iowa Blackhawks | W | 51-48 |
| 05/06/2006 | Missouri Minutemen | W | 57-18 |
| 05/13/2006 | at Missouri Storm | W | NA |
| 05/27/2006 | Missouri Storm | W | 85-0 |
| 06/03/2006 | at Missouri Minutemen | W | 63-14 |
| 06/10/2006 | at Kansas Koyotes | L | 37-34 |
| 06/17/2006 | Iowa Blackhawks | L | 50-47 (OT) |
| 06/24/2006 | at Missouri Minutemen | W | 63-26 |
| 07/01/2006 | Iowa Blackhawks | W | 41-27 |
| 07/08/2006 | Nebraska Wildcats | W | NA |
| 07/15/2006 | at Kansas Koyotes | W | 55-44 |

== Wichita Aviators rosters ==
2005 roster

| Name | Position | Height | Weight | College |
|---|---|---|---|---|
| Jonathan Beasley | QB | 6-0 | 220 | Kansas State |
| Lorenzo Burrell | FB | 6-2 | 270 | Butler County CC |
| Rick Coon | OL | 6-1 | 260 | Bethel |
| Joe Davis | DB | 6-0 | 175 | Hutchinson CC |
| Blake Dart | LB | 5-11 | 237 | Washburn |
| Michael Eason | WR | 5-9 | 195 | McPherson |
| Idris Elias | RB | 5-11 | 235 | Wyoming |
| Dustin Gates | DB | 6-0 | 215 | Friends |
| Ziya Gunnay | K | 5-7 | 150 | McPherson |
| James Hanton | DB | 6-0 | 200 | Saint Francis |
| Heath Henderson | OL/DL | 6-0 | 290 | Oklahoma Panhandle State |
| Earl Henry | LB | 5-10 | 225 | Pittsburg State |
| Jason Henry | DE | 6-2 | 235 | McPherson |
| James Huntington | DE | 6-4 | 235 | Hinds CC |
| Jamie Jeffries | DB | 5-9 | 175 | Hutchinson CC |
| Freddie Kincaid | DL | 6-1 | 260 | N/A |
| Sean McGinnis | DL | 6-4 | 260 | Nebraska-Omaha |
| Jackie Nash | OL | 6-1 | 320 | Friends |
| Erick Olson | OL/DL | 6-1 | 255 | Butler County CC |
| Bobby Patterson | LB | 6-1 | 230 | Arkansas State |
| Donald Payne | WR | 6-5 | 230 | Appalachian State |
| David Reed | OL/DL | 6-1 | 260 | Garden City CC |
| Carl Richardson | RB | 6-0 | 200 | Western New Mexico |
| Richard Rutherford | OL | 5-11 | 315 | Friends |
| Lucas Schroeder | WR | 5-10 | 240 | Southwestern |
| Kelley Sayahncjad | OL | 6-0 | 335 | Friends |
| Percy Starr | RB | 5-8 | 175 | Friends |
| Jordan Taylor | WR | 5-6 | 165 | Dodge City CC |
| Courtney Walters | DB | 5-10 | 175 | Friends |
| Chris Williams | WR | 6-0 | 170 | Arkansas Central |
| Matt Williams | LB | 6-2 | 250 | Langston |
| Orlandis Williams | WR | 6-1 | 190 | Louisiana Tech |
| John Wise | QB | 6-1 | 225 | Friends |

2006 roster

| Number | Name | Position | Height | Weight | College |
|---|---|---|---|---|---|
| 1 | Chris Williams | WR | 6-0 | 170 | Arkansas Central |
| 2 | Anthony Sullivan | DB | 6-0 | 195 | Southwest Missouri State |
| 3 | Reggie Smith | WR | 5-10 | 180 | Butler County CC |
| 4 | JJ McCoy | DB | 5-10 | 180 | Fort Hays State |
| 5 | Jordan Taylor | WR | 5-6 | 165 | Dodge City CC |
| 7 | Earl Henry | LB | 5-10 | 225 | Pittsburg State |
| 8 | Phillip Baron | RB | 5-9 | 205 | Bethel |
| 9 | Peter Garibaldi | WR | 5-10 | 175 | Bethel |
| 11 | Antoine Williams | DB | 5-9 | 185 | Central Missouri State |
| 12 | Matt Kelly | QB | 5-11 | 180 | Friends |
| 16 | John Wise | QB | 5-11 | 225 | Friends |
| 18 | Jess Langvardt | DB | 5-10 | 190 | Sterling |
| 21 | Ziya Gunnay | K | 5-7 | 150 | McPherson |
| 22 | Orlandis Williams | WR | 6-1 | 190 | Louisiana Tech |
| 25 | Freddie Nails | FB | 6-1 | 235 | McPherson |
| 28 | Jerod Barret | DB | 6-0 | 190 | Kansas Wesleyan |
| 34 | Matt Williams | LB | 6-1 | 255 | Langston |
| 39 | Idris Elias | RB | 5-11 | 235 | Wyoming |
| 40 | Emeka Ogbonna | LB | 6-0 | 230 | Oklahoma State |
| 43 | Matt Weber | LB | 6-2 | 265 | Murray State |
| 50 | Heath Henderson | OL | 6-0 | 290 | Oklahoma Panhandle State |
| 53 | Robert Barley | DL | 5-10 | 325 | Friends |
| 58 | Scott Robinson | OL | 6-6 | 320 | Friends |
| 74 | Louis Schneider | OL | 6-3 | 320 | McPherson |
| 75 | Jackie Nash | OL | 6-1 | 320 | Friends |
| 76 | Kelley Sayahncjad | OL | 6-0 | 335 | Friends |
| 78 | Jeremy Javers | DL | 6-1 | 310 | South Dakota State |
| 80 | Donald Payne | WR | 6-5 | 220 | Appalachian State |
| 92 | Ricky Gottschalk | DL | 6-0 | 245 | McPherson |
| NA | Ty Ardoin | DB | 6-0 | 215 | Texas Tech |
| NA | Moderick Johnson | WR | 6-6 | 200 | Kansas |
| NA | Bryce Hanks | DB | 5-10 | 190 | Kansas State |
