= Nebraska Extreme =

American indoor professional football team

The Nebraska Extreme were an indoor football team that plays in the American Professional Football League. They started as the Omaha Extreme and played their 2006 season in the MIFL. They finished with a 5–3 record.

In their second season, the Extreme played as an associate member of the APFL. Only scheduled to play one game against Springfield, they played three games after the Fort Worth Regulators folded. They played two games against the Springfield Wolfpack and one game against the Kansas Koyotes. They were also going to play a game against the Iowa Blackhawks, but the Blackhawks opted to cancel the game and take the forfeit win over Fort Worth. The Extreme finished the season 0–4.

The team will become the Nebraska Extreme in 2008. The team is to play road games and one home game, likely in Lincoln, Nebraska.

== Season-by-season ==
Season records
Season	W	L	T	Finish	Playoff results
Omaha Extreme
2006	0	3	0	6th League	--
Nebraska Extreme
2007	0	4	0	--	--

== See also ==
- Sports in Omaha
