= Texas Thunder (American football) =

Professional indoor football team

- Founded: 2004
- Folded: 2004
- League: American Professional Football League
- Based in: Texas
- Head coach: James Sanders

The Texas Thunder were a professional indoor football team that played in the American Professional Football League in 2004. The Thunder tied the Missouri Minutemen 42-42 in their inaugural APFL game.

The Thunder coaches were James Sanders, Chris Chandler and Art Tarango. Players of note were:

- Matt Holem (AF2, IPFL)
- Hallart Keaton (NIFL, IFL)
- Rolf Shaefer (NIFL, PIFL)
- Mark Ricker (NIFL, APFL)
- Larry Hendrix (NIFL)
- Darrell Wilkins (NIFL, IFL)
- Joshua Sooter (IFL, NIFL)
- Fred Robinson (IPFL)

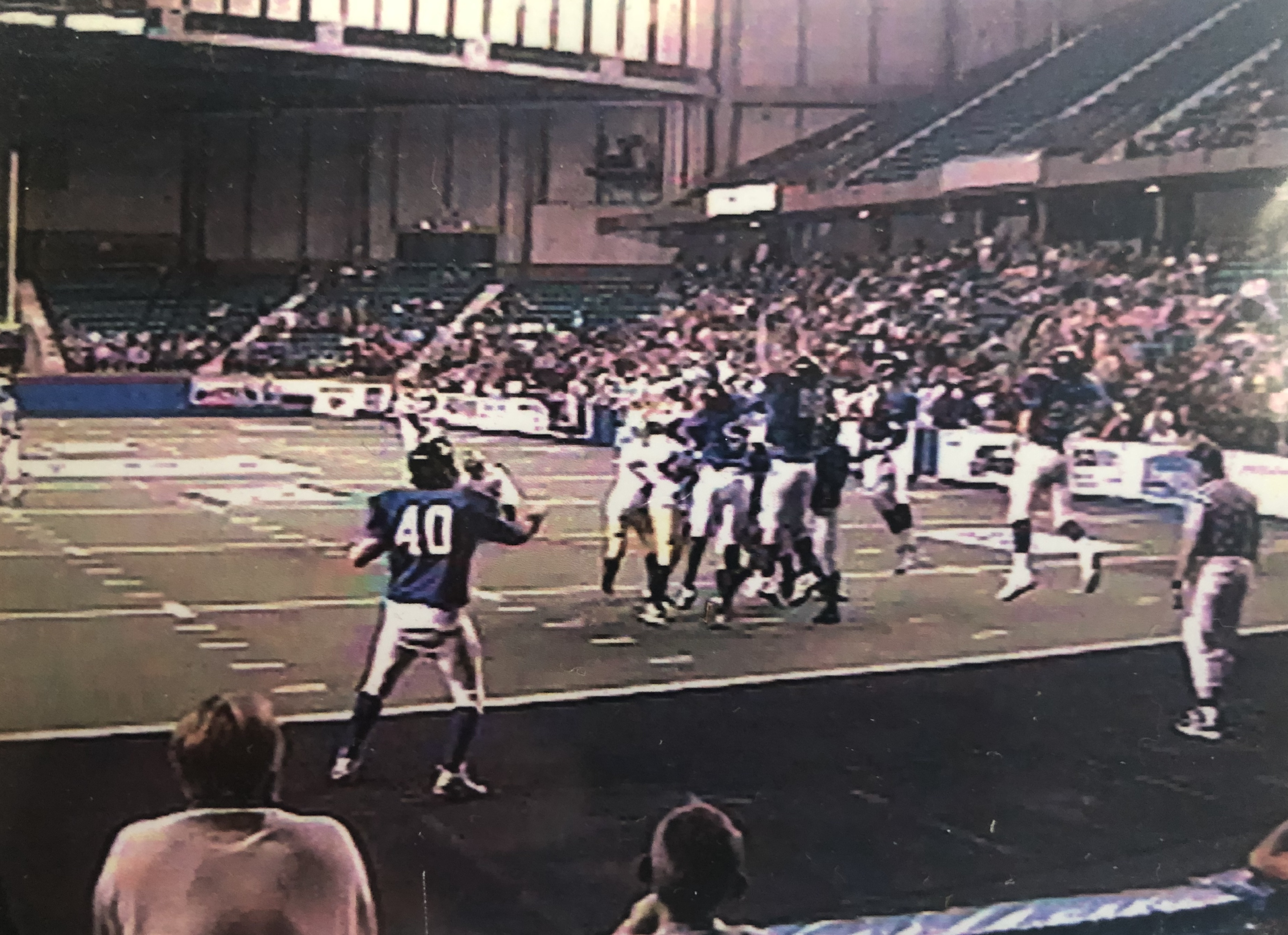
Texas Thunder vs Kansas Koyotes

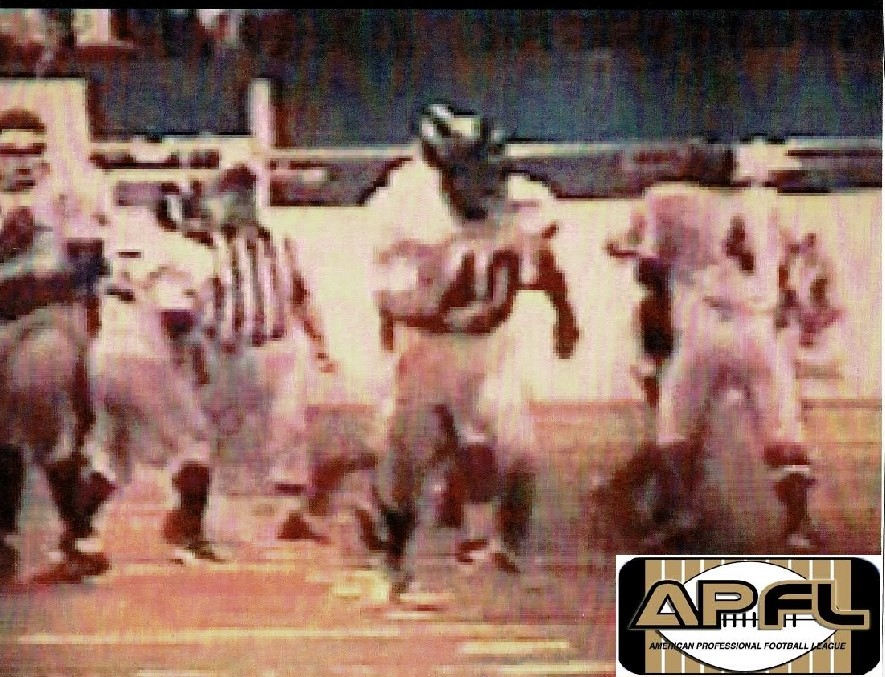
Texas Thunder playing in Kansas City
