= Conroe Storm =

American indoor football team

Conroe Storm
Founded	2006
Arena	Lone Star Expo Center
Based in	Conroe, Texas
Colors	Blue, yellow, silver
League	American Professional Football League
Head coach	Ed Ramirez
President	Ruth Mooney

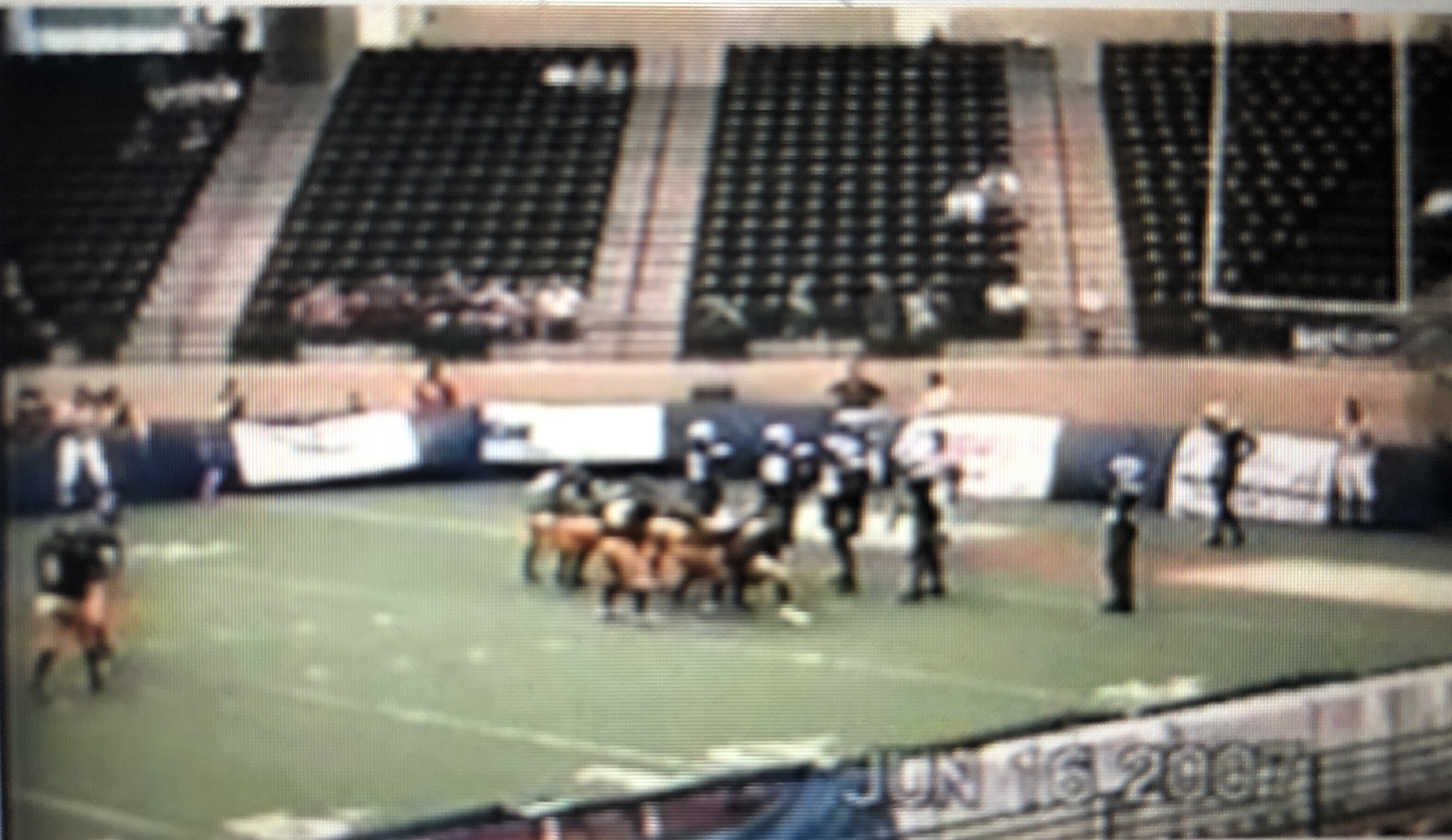
2007 Conroe Storm vs San Antonio Steers

The Conroe Storm was an American indoor football team based out of Conroe, Texas, that played in the American Professional Football League. They were originally slated to play in the Ultimate Indoor Football League before that league's aborted merger with the NAIFL. After it appeared the NAIFL would not play, they moved to APFL.

In their first season, they finished 2nd in the league but lost at home to the Iowa Blackhawks in the playoffs. In the 2008 season, they finished in first place in the APFL South Division, however due to league problems and games being cancelled on them, they declined to play in the championship game and withdrew from the league.

== Season-by-season ==
Season records
Season	W	L	T	Finish	Playoff results
2007	8	2	0	2nd League	Lost Semifinals (Iowa)
2008	8	1	0	1st Southern	No playoff game held, withdrew from championship game
Totals	16	3	0	(including playoffs)	
