= 2000 Sioux City Attack season =

- General manager: Jim Steele
- Head coach: Jim Anderson
- Home stadium: Sioux City Municipal Auditorium; 401 Gordon Drive; Sioux City, Iowa 51101

Results
- Record: 9-5
- Division place: 3rd Southern
- Conference place: 5th Western
- League place: 8th League
- Playoffs: Won Wild card round (Lincoln) 52-38; Lost Conference semifinals (Bismarck) 30-14

The 2000 Sioux City Attack season was the team's first overall and first as a member of the original Indoor Football League (IFL). One of twenty-one teams in the IFL for the league's second season, the Attack finished the regular season with a 9–5 record (good enough for third in their Southern Division) to earn the number five seed in the ten-team Western Conference, in which they traveled to Lincoln, Nebraska for the wild card round to play the Lincoln Lightning and defeated them, 52–38. They then moved on to Bismarck, North Dakota, to face the Western's Conference's top-seeded team, the Bismarck Blaze. The Attack had already beaten the Blaze once in the regular season, but fell, 30–14 in the conference semifinals.

The Attack played their home games at the Sioux City Municipal Auditorium in Sioux City, Iowa, under the direction of head coach Jim Anderson.

== Schedule ==
Key: Win Loss Bye

=== Regular season ===
Week	Day	Date	Kickoff	Opponent	Results		Location	Attendance
Week	Day	Date	Kickoff	Opponent	Score	Record	Location	Attendance
1	Friday	March 31	7:05pm	at Lincoln Lightning	L 27–40	0–1	Pershing Center	4,698
2	Saturday	April 8	7:05pm	at Sioux Falls Cobras	W 47–31	1–1	Sioux Falls Arena	4,800
3	Saturday	April 15	7:05pm	at Wichita Warlords	L 20–28	1–2	Kansas Coliseum	3,266
4	Friday	April 21	7:35pm	Wichita Warlords	W 59–27	2–2	Sioux City Municipal Auditorium	2,769
5	Saturday	April 29	7:35pm	Bismarck Blaze	W 57–49	3–2	Sioux City Municipal Auditorium	2,173
6	Saturday	May 6	7:05pm	at Topeka Knights	L 24–31 (OT)	3–3	Landon Arena	2,288
7	Saturday	May 13	7:35pm	Fargo Freeze	W 30–12	4–3	Sioux City Municipal Auditorium	2,068
8	Saturday	May 20	6:05pm	at Johnstown Jackyls	W 57–47	5–3	Cambria County War Memorial Arena	2,339
9	Saturday	May 27	7:35pm	Sioux Falls Cobras	W 49–35	6–3	Sioux City Municipal Auditorium	2,378
10	Saturday	June 3	7:05pm	at Peoria Pirates	L 35–68	6–4	Carver Arena	9,220
11	Saturday	June 10	7:35pm	Black Hills Machine	L 36–39	6–5	Sioux City Municipal Auditorium	1,561
12	Saturday	June 17	7:35pm	Topeka Knights	W 37–29	7–5	Sioux City Municipal Auditorium	1,703
13	Saturday	June 24	7:35pm	Lincoln Lightning	W 36–20	8–5	Sioux City Municipal Auditorium	2,231
14	BYE							
15	Saturday	July 8	6:05pm	at Erie Invaders	W 54–31	9–5	Erie Civic Center	2,850

=== Post-season ===
Round	Day	Date	Kickoff	Opponent	Results		Location	Attendance
Round	Day	Date	Kickoff	Opponent	Score	Record	Location	Attendance
Wild card round	Saturday	July 15	7:05pm	at Lincoln Lightning	W 52–38	10–5	Pershing Center	3,900
Conference semifinals	Saturday	July 22	7:35pm	at Bismarck Blaze	L 14–30	10–6	Bismarck Civic Center	4,101

=== 2000 Playoffs ===
Rapid City, South Dakota	Topeka, Kansas
6	Casper	32
3	Black Hills	21
3	Black Hills	75	Bismarck, North Dakota
2	Topeka	26
Western Conference
Lincoln, Nebraska	2	Topeka	29
Bismarck, North Dakota
1	Bismarck	38
5	Sioux City	52	Western Conference Championship
5	Sioux City	14
4	Lincoln	38	Peoria, Illinois
1	Bismarck	30
Wild Card playoffs
Divisional playoffs
Ashwaubenon, Wisconsin	W1	Bismarck	42
Wheeling, West Virginia
E1	Peoria	69
6	Dayton	23	2000 Gold Cup
3	Green Bay	10
3	Green Bay	64	Peoria, Illinois
2	Steel Valley	21
Eastern Conference
Madison, Wisconsin	2	Steel Valley	55
Peoria, Illinois
1	Peoria	75
5	Erie	22	Eastern Conference Championship
4	Madison	13
4	Madison	34
1	Peoria	25

== Roster ==
2000 Sioux City Attack roster
Quarterbacks: 12 Jarrod DeGeorgia; Running backs: 36 Philip Meehan; 38 Lamont Truitt; Wide receivers: 1 Jon Elder; 3 Ervin Whitehead; 15 Philip Wilson	Offensive linemen: 71 Ken Diepenbrock; 73 Erv Strohbeen; 79 Evan Matau; Defensive linemen: 55 Art Maulupe; 60 Darwin Bishop; 68 Steve Schmidt; 77 Erik Nelson	Linebackers: 32 Matt Hughes; 53 Shawn Bauer; Defensive backs: 9 Courtney Porter; 21 Andre Fields; 23 Deondre Jones; 46 Eric Davidson; Kickers: 44 Adam Kennett; Roster updated May 1, 2016
