= Wichita Wild =

Former professional indoor football team based in Wichita, Kansas

Logo

General information
- Founded: 2006
- Folded: 2014
- Headquartered: Hartman Arena in Park City, Kansas
- Colors: Black, Orange, White

Personnel
- Owner: Wink Hartman
- Head coach: Paco Martinez

Team history
- Wichita Wild (2007–2014)

Home fields
- Kansas Coliseum (2007–2008); Hartman Arena (2009–2014)

League / conference affiliations
- Independent (2007) United Indoor Football (2008): Eastern Division (2008); Indoor Football League (2009–2012): United Conference (2009–2011); Central Division (2009); Central West Division (2010); Great Plains Division (2011); Intense Conference (2012); Champions Professional Indoor Football League (2013–2014)

Championships
- League championships: 2: CPIFL: 2013, 2014
- Division championships: 1: IFL Central: 2009

Playoff appearances (5)
- IFL: 2009, 2010, 2012 CPIFL 2013, 2014

The Wichita Wild were a professional indoor football team based in Wichita, Kansas. They were members of the Champions Professional Indoor Football League (CPIFL). The team was founded in 2006 as an independent indoor football franchise. In 2008, the team joined United Indoor Football (UIF). They joined the Indoor Football League (IFL) during the UIF and Intense Football League merger of 2009. In 2012, the team left the IFL to become charter members of the CPIFL. The Wild's home games were played at Hartman Arena in nearby Park City. When they lost their lease with the Hartman Arena, they folded..

== History ==
The Wild joined the CPIFL after playing in the Indoor Football League for the past four seasons. The IFL was formed in 2008 through a merger between the Intense Football League and the United Indoor Football (UIF) league. Both leagues had been in business for four seasons before the merger. The Wild host their home games in Park City, Kansas at the Hartman Arena. The owner of the team is Wink Hartman.

Ken Matous was hired as head coach of the team on July 28, 2008. Matous came to the Wild from the Columbus Destroyers of the Arena Football League (AFL), where he served as offensive coordinator, special teams coordinator, and directed player personnel for three seasons. After an 0–5 start to the 2011 season, Matous was fired. Wild assistant coach, Morris Lolar, was then designated the interim head coach for the last nine games of the Wild’s 2011 season where he inherited an 0-5 team, but lead them to a 6-3 finish to earn the full-time position. In 2012, Lolar led a young Wild team all the way to the IFL conference championship game, but they ultimately fell to the Tri-Cities Fever 51-30 to end their season. Lolar then returned for the 2013 season with a more experienced team heading into their inaugural season with the newly formed Champions Professional Indoor Football League, where they finished with a 12-2 record, a championship win against the Salina Bombers, and a 7-0 record at home to close out the season. Lolar’s leadership in the 2013 season earned the team several league awards and an honorable mention as CPIFL Coach of the Year.

After winning their second consecutive CPIFL Championship, owner Wink Hartman put the team up for sale on July 2, 2014. The Wild effectively folded after not joining the new Champions Indoor Football league after its merger with the Lone Star Football League.

== Season-by-season ==
Season records
Season	W	L	T	Finish	Playoff results
Wichita Wild (Independent)
2007	9	0	0	--	--
Wichita Wild (UIF)
2008	2	12	0	4th East	--
Wichita Wild (IFL)
2009	8	6	0	3rd United Central	Won United Conference Quarterfinal (Bloomington); Won United Conference Semifinal (Omaha); Lost United Conference Championship (River City)
2010	9	5	0	2nd Central West	Won Round 1 (Bloomington); Won United Conference Semifinal (Rochester); Lost United Conference Championship (Sioux Falls)
2011	6	8	0	3rd Great Plains	--
2012	8	6	0	3rd Intense	Won Intense Conference Semifinal (Allen); Lost Intense Conference Championship (Tri-Cities)
Wichita Wild (CPIFL)
2013	12	2	0	3rd League	Won Semi-Finals (Omaha); Won Champions Bowl I (Salina)
2014	10	2	0	1st League	Won Semi-Finals (Dodge City); Won Champions Bowl II (Sioux City)
Totals	72	44	0	(including playoffs)	

== Past seasons ==
=== 2007 season ===
They began play in 2007 as an independent organization playing all games at home against semi-pro opponents from the midwest. They played their home games at the Kansas Coliseum. The Wichita Wild went undefeated with a record of 9 wins and no losses.

=== 2008 season ===
In 2008, they competed in the UIF. The UIF the next season merged with the Intense Football League to form the Indoor Football League. They played their home games at the Kansas Coliseum in Wichita, Kansas.

Date	Team	Result
3/8/08	Sioux City Bandits	L 23-31
3/15/08	River City Rage	L 25-26
3/22/08	@Bloomington	L 38-59
4/5/08	Bloomington Extreme	L 35-44
4/10/08	Omaha Beef	L 24-31
4/19/08	@River City Rage	W 22-15
4/26/08	@Billings Outlaws	L 13-55
5/3/08	@Omaha Beef	L 16-67
5/10/08	@Colorado Ice	W 35-31
5/17/08	@Sioux Falls Storm	L 14-57
4/24/08	River City Rage	L 13-41
5/31/08	Omaha Beef	L 6-54
6/7/08	Billings Outlaws	L 31-58
6/13/08	@Colorado Ice	L 24-56

=== 2009 season ===
The Wild's breakout year came in 2009 when the Wild established themselves as top tier indoor football franchise. The Wild won the IFL's Central Division and fell in the Conference Championship game to RiverCity. Following the season, Wichita was recognized as the IFL Franchise of the Year. Running back Darius Fudge set league records for rushing touchdowns and rushing yards, which still stand today. Fudge was named the IFL's Offensive Rookie of the Year.

Date	Team	Result
3/20/09	@Omaha	L 36-41
4/04/09	Sioux Falls Storm	L 41-45
4/11/09	River City Rage	W 56-40
4/18/09	@River City Rage	L 31-52
4/25/09	@Sioux City Bandits	L 28-30
5/2/09	Abilene RuffRiders	W 49-33
5/9/09	@San Angelo Stampede	W 48-35
5/16/09	@Sioux Falls Storm	L 21-49
5/23/09	Odessa Roughnecks	W 62-42
5/30/09	@Sioux City Bandits	W 39-29
6/6/09	@Bloomington Extreme	L 34-38
6/13/09	Omaha Beef	W 39-37
6/27/09	River City Rage	W 73-33
7/2/09	Alaska Wild	W 76-9

=== 2010 season ===
For the new season the Wild have returned last years stars in Dixie Wooten, Clinton Soloman, and Darius Fudge. The Wichita Wild Season opener was February, 26 at the Hartman Arena. The 2010 season was the most successful season in franchise history in terms of success on and off the field. The team went 9-5 in the 2010 regular season and went on to win two playoff games before falling to Sioux Falls in the United Conference Championship. The 11 total wins for the Wild in 2010 was the most in franchise history. The team also set a record for total attendance by seeing almost 30,000 fans attend Wild home games in 2010. A crowd of 4,755 attended and watched the Wild snag their first win of the 2010 season. After an 8-4 start to the 2010 Indoor Football League season the Wichita Wild Clinched their second playoff berth in franchise history.

=== 2011 season ===
The previous season's success did not carry over to the 2011 season. Starting 0-5, the Wild matched their worst start in team history (they had previously started 0-5 during their inaugural UIF season). Their start lead to the firing of head coach Ken Matous, and Morris Lolar was named the interim head coach. Although the Wild bravely rallied and went 6-3 the rest of the way, their 6-8 finish and third place standing in the Great Plains Division was not enough for a third consecutive playoff berth (the first time since 2008 that the Wild had missed the playoffs and finished with a losing record).

=== 2012 season ===
The Wild would return to their winning ways in 2012. Like the previous season, the Wild had started 0-4; what was different, though, is their 8-2 finish was able to pull them into third place in the Intense Conference with an 8-6 record, returning the Wild to the playoffs. After an upset road win over the Allen Wranglers in the conference semifinals, the Wild would once again fall short of the United Bowl, losing to the Tri-Cities Fever in what would be their final game in the IFL before moving to the CPIFL the following season.

=== 2013 season: Switching leagues and winning a championship ===
The 2013 season was a year of firsts for the Wichita Wild. They competed in the Indoor Football League from 2009-2012. During their tenure in the IFL, the Wild made it to three Conference Championships, but couldn't finish and get to the United Bowl. In 2013, the Wild left the IFL for a new league that was created with former members of the American Professional Football League and a few more from the IFL. Together, the new league consisted of 10 teams in total. Every founding member of the league was close to one another in geographic proximity. The Wild opened the season on a strong note, with four straight wins over the Oklahoma, Salina, Kansas, and Bloomington. They suffered their first loss of the season in a close game to the Kansas City Renegades. The Wild finished with a franchise best record of 10-2, heading into the 2013 playoffs. In a three-way tie for the best league record, The Wild were slotted as the #3 seed in a four team playoff. In the first round of the playoffs, the Wild faced a familiar foe from their prior IFL days, the Omaha Beef. In a tightly contested match up, Wichita was victorious on the road, outlasting their rivals by a score of (31-25). With the win, Wichita secured their first ever trip to a championship game. Their opponent was the #4 seeded Salina Bombers who they would host at their home venue, Hartman Arena. The Bombers, a brand new team, also enjoyed a magical first season finishing at (8-3) and were fresh off upsetting the #1 seed and two time APFL Champion Sioux City Bandits in their 1st round of the playoffs. In convincing fashion, Wichita dominated the Bombers in the first ever Champions Bowl, as they jumped out to an early three possession lead and never looked back. Wild quarterback Rocky Hinds was named the game's MVP, completing 18 of 22 passes for 163 yards and four touchdowns. The final score was (47-34). With the win, Wichita secured their first ever league title of any kind and became the first ever champions of the Champions Professional Indoor Football League.

Week	Date	Kickoff	Opponent	Results	
Week	Date	Kickoff	Opponent	Final Score	Team Record
1	March 9 (Sat)	7:30pm	@Oklahoma Defenders	70-26	1-0
2	March 16 (Sat)	7:30pm	@Salina Bombers	63-34	2-0
3	March 23 (Sat)	7:05pm	Kansas Koyotes	39-20	3-0
4	March 30 (Sat)	7:05pm	Bloomington Edge	52-22	4-0
5	April 6 (Sat)	7:30pm	@Kansas City Renegades	36-40	4-1
6	April 12 (Fri)	7:05pm	@Bloomington Edge	49-35	5-1
7	April 20 (Sat)	7:05pm	Omaha Beef	29-17	6-1
8	April 27 (Sat)	7:30pm	@Mid-Missouri Outlaws	82-9	7-1
9	May 4 (Sat)	7:05pm	Oklahoma Defenders	73-7	8-1
10	May 11 (Sat)	7:05pm	Salina Bombers	45-40	9-1
11	Bye				
12	May 25 (Sat)	7:05pm	@Sioux City Bandits	21-46	9-2
13	Bye				
14	June 8 (Sat)	7:05pm	Mid-Missouri Outlaws	74-16	10-2

=== 2014 ===
Week	Date	Kickoff	Opponent	Results	
Week	Date	Kickoff	Opponent	Final Score	Team Record
1	February 28 (Fri)	7:05pm	@Lincoln Haymakers	62-10	1-0
2	Off-Week				
3	March 16 (Sun)	3:05pm	@Oklahoma Defenders	50-44	2-0
4	March 22 (Sat)	7:05pm	Dodge City Law	40-7	3-0
5	April 5 (Sat)	7:05pm	@Sioux City Bandits	45-48	3-1
6	Off-Week				
7	April 12 (Sat)	7:05pm	Lincoln Haymakers	49-32	4-1
8	April 19 (Sat)	7:05pm	@Omaha Beef	66-33	5-1
9	April 26 (Sat)	7:05pm	Oklahoma Defenders	67-37	6-1
10	May 3 (Sat)	7:05pm	@Salina Bombers	11-13	6-2
11	May 17 (Sat)	7:05pm	Kansas Koyotes	14-52	7-2
12	May 24 (Sat)	7:05pm	@Dodge City Law	47-38	8-2
13	May 31 (Sat)	7:05pm	Sioux City Bandits	54-59	9-2
14	June 7 (Sat)	7:05pm	Salina Bombers	41-63	10-2

== vs opponent ==
Opponent	OVERALL	HOME	AWAY	PLYFF
Abilene Ruff Riders	(1-0)	(1-0)	(0-0)	(0-0)
Alaska Wild	(1-0)	(1-0)	(0-0)	(0-0)
Allen Wranglers	(3-3)	(1-1)	(2-2)	(1-0)
Amarillo Venom	(1-0)	(1-0)	(0-0)	(0-0)
Billings Outlaws	(0-2)	(0-1)	(0-1)	(0-0)
Bloomington Edge*	(6-3)	(4-1)	(2-2)	(2-0)
Bricktown Brawlers	(1-0)	(0-0)	(1-0)	(0-0)
Colorado Ice	(3-1)	(1-0)	(2-1)	(0-0)
Dodge City Law	(0-0)	(0-0)	(0-0)	(0-0)
Green Bay Blizzard	(0-3)	(0-1)	(0-2)	(0-0)
Kansas Koyotes	(1-0)	(1-0)	(0-0)	(0-0)
La Crosse Spartans	(1-0)	(1-0)	(0-0)	(0-0)
Nebraska Danger	(2-2)	(2-0)	(0-2)	(0-0)
New Mexico Stars	(2-0)	(1-0)	(1-0)	(0-0)
Oklahoma Defenders	(1-0)	(0-0)	(1-0)	(0-0)
Omaha Beef	(6-8)	(3-3)	(3-5)	(1-0)
RiverCity Rage	(3-4)	(2-3)	(1-1)	(0-1)
Rochester Raiders	(1-0)	(1-0)	(0-0)	(1-0)
Salina Bombers	(3-0)	(2-0)	(1-0)	(1-0)
San Angelo Stampede	(2-0)	(1-0)	(1-0)	(0-0)
Sioux City Bandits	(3-3)	(1-1)	(2-2)	(0-0)
Sioux Falls Storm	(1-9)	(0-5)	(1-4)	(0-1)
Tri-Cities Fever	(0-1)	(0-0)	(0-1)	(0-1)
West Texas Roughnecks***	(2-1)	(1-1)	(1-0)	(0-0)

* = was called the Bloomington Extreme prior to 2012

** = was called the Odessa Roughnecks prior to 2010
