= Kansas Coliseum =

Entertainment complex in Kansas, United States

- "The Big Brown Barn"
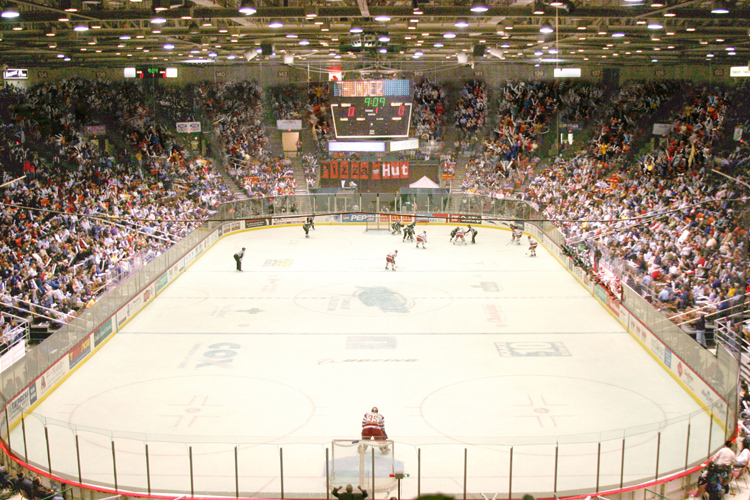
- Interactive map of Kansas Coliseum
- Location: 1279 E 85th St North; Park City, Kansas; 67147 USA
- Coordinates: 37.83609°N 97.321205°W
- Owner: Sedgwick County
- Operator: SMG
- Capacity: Britt Brown Arena: 12,200 Max: 9,686 (Ice Hockey)
- Surface: Ice
- Field size: 36,500 sq.ft. (146’ x 250’)

Construction
- Opened: 1977
- Renovated: 2006
- Closed: February 22, 2010
- Cost: $10.3 Million
- Architects: Thomas, Harris, Ash and Mason
- General contractors: Dondlinger & Sons Construction Co. Inc.

Tenants
- Wichita Wings (MISL/NPSL) (1979–2001); Wichita Thunder (CHL) (1992–2009); Wichita Stealth (af2) (2001–2004); Wichita Aviators (APFL) (2005–2006); Wichita Wild (UIF) (2007–2008)

Kansas Coliseum was an entertainment complex in unincorporated Sedgwick County, Kansas, United States. It was located north of Wichita at the intersection of Interstate 135 and 85th Street North.

It hosted sporting events, concerts, shows, and consisted of four pavilions, an RV park, and the 9,686-seat Britt Brown Arena, named for Harry Britton (Britt) Brown Jr., of Wichita, the former owner of The Wichita Eagle newspaper. Arena capacity could be configured for up to 12,200 people.

== History ==
Kansas Coliseum was opened in 1977. Two brass plaques (one located on the lower level, by the box office windows and the other up on the main concourse) read:

"Dedicated September 1978, for the promotion of agricultural, educational, and cultural benefits, on behalf of the people of the world, by the citizens of Sedgwick County, the board of the county commissioners, the Kansas State Park and Resources Authority, the Economic Development Administration and the Ozark Regional Commission of the United States Department of Commerce and the Kansas Coliseum Corporation."

It hosted NCAA Men's Basketball tournament first and second-round games in 1994. The Wichita State University basketball teams played the 2002–03 season there while the Shockers' on-campus home, Charles Koch Arena, was undergoing major renovations.

It was the home of the now-defunct Wichita Wings indoor soccer team, who played in the MISL and NPSL between 1979 and 2001. The Kansas Coliseum was the home venue for the Wichita Stealth, Wichita Aviators, and Wichita Wild indoor/arena football teams between 2001 and 2008. It also was home to the Wichita Thunder ice hockey team that played in the Coliseum from 1992 to 2009. The Wichita Thunder now plays in the INTRUST Bank Arena (which is also owned by Sedgwick County and was Operated by SMG (which merged with AEG Facilities to form ASM Global in 2019, with ASM taking over all SMG arenas including ISA)) in downtown Wichita, Kansas.

The last Wichita Thunder hockey game ever played at the Kansas Coliseum was on January 9, 2010, in front of a home crowd of 5,556. The Thunder lost the game 3–1 to the Odessa Jackalopes. Brent Ottmann would be the last Thunder player to score a goal in the building at 2:05 of the 1st period, and Kenny Bernard of Odessa scoring the last goal ever at 19:53 of the 3rd period.

The final event to take place inside the Arena was the RV and Boat show on February 20, 2010. On February 22, 2010, The Britt Brown Arena closed its doors following the opening of the Intrust Bank Arena. The arena ceased hosting events, while the neighboring Kansas Pavilions portion of the complex remained open until late 2016.

On January 10, 2012, the entire Coliseum complex was sold by Sedgwick County to aviation research developer Johnny Stevens for a sum of $1,462,487.12. The Britt Brown Arena was transformed into an aerospace testing facility for the National Institute for Aviation Research of Wichita State University.

== Events ==
=== Concerts ===
List of concerts
- KISS – October 12, 1979, November 22, 1987, May 9, 1990, with Slaughter, September 10, 1996 with Alice in Chains, and August 28, 2000, with Ted Nugent and Skid Row
- Aerosmith – December 12, 1978, February 24, 1988, with Dokken, July 12, 1990, with The Black Crowes, December 21, 1997, with The Talk Show and December 6, 2002, with Kid Rock & Twisted Brown Trucker and Run–D.M.C.
- Ted Nugent – January 26, 1979
- Jethro Tull – April 24, 1979
- The Moody Blues – May 11, 1979, with Jimmie Spheeris and June 6, 1984
- Eric Clapton – June 19, 1979, with Muddy Waters and March 19, 1981
- Journey – July 12, 1979, with Thin Lizzy and April 18 and July 14, 1983, with Bryan Adams
- Foreigner – September 8, 1979 and February 22, 1982, with Bryan Adams
- The Beach Boys – September 29, 1979, with Prism
- Rush – February 10, 1980, with Max Webster, October 17, 1982, with Rory Gallagher, June 15, 1984, with Gary Moore, May 2, 1986, with Blue Öyster Cult and May 24, 1992, with Mr. Big
- The Charlie Daniels Band – July 16, 1980
- Foghat – July 30, 1980 and April 25, 1983, with Triumph
- Fleetwood Mac – August 23, 1980, with Rocky Burnette
- Max Webster – December 10, 1980, with Molly Hatchet
- Styx – June 5, 1981, May 19, 1983 and March 7, 2003, with REO Speedwagon
- Jefferson Starship – July 19, 1981, with .38 Special
- ZZ Top – August 19, 1981, with Loverboy, January 5, 1983, January 22, 1984, with Night Ranger, February 1, 1986, October 25, 1990, with Colin James and November 14, 1999, with Lynyrd Skynyrd and The Screamin' Cheetah Wheelies
- Van Halen – October 16, 1981, November 24, 1982, with After the Fire, June 17, 1984, with Autograph, May 28, 1986 with BTO, November 4, 1988, February 3, 1992, with The Baby Animals, September 22, 1995 with brother cane, and November 6, 2004, with Silvertide
- Blue Öyster Cult – November 3, 1981, with Foghat and November 18, 1983, with Rainbow
- Ozzy Osbourne – February 27, 1982, with Magnum, May 2, 1984, with Mötley Crüe and Ratt, March 27, 1986, with Metallica, October 29, 1992, with Alice in Chains and December 7, 2007, with Rob Zombie and In This Moment
- Rod Stewart – March 13, 1982 and August 26, 2004
- The Oak Ridge Boys – April 24, 1982, with The Corbin/Hanner Band and February 2, 1985, with Exile
- .38 Special – June 20, 1982, with Aldo Nova
- April Wine – October 1, 1982
- Pat Benatar – March 12, 1983, with Red Rider
- Neil Young – July 1, 1983, with The Fabulous Pinks
- Def Leppard – September 4, 1983, December 9, 1987 with Tesla, December 23, 1992, June 4, 2002 and June 4, 2003
- Stevie Nicks – November 13, 1983, with Joe Walsh
- The Police – November 25, 1983
- Scorpions – May 12, 1984, with Bon Jovi
- Stevie Ray Vaughan and Double Trouble – May 20, 1984
- Tina Turner – October 23, 1984 and October 23, 1985
- Billy Squier – December 8, 1984, with Molly Hatchet
- Barry Manilow – January 5, 1985
- Deep Purple – January 20, 1985, with Giuffria and June 8, 2001
- The Firm – March 2, 1985
- Bryan Adams – May 5, 1985 and August 23, 1987
- Ratt – July 23, 1985, with Bon Jovi, February 15, 1986, with Poison and Joan Jett and the Blackhearts and March 21, 1989, with Britny Fox and Kix
- REO Speedwagon – February 12, 1983 and August 31, 1985, with Cheap Trick and February 1, 2001, with Styx
- AC/DC – October 9, 1985, with Yngwie Malmsteen and July 31, 1988, with White Lion
- The Osmonds – December 19, 1985
- The Hooters – March 22, 1986 with Loverboy
- Judas Priest – July 17, 1984 and August 19, 1986
- David Lee Roth – August 30, 1986, with Cinderella
- Iron Maiden – February 4, 1987, with The Vinnie Vincent Invasion
- Kansas – March 6, 1981 with Loverboy; February 22, 1987; July 26, 1991 with Shooting Star; July 25, 1992; May 22, 2002 with Styx.
- Alice Cooper – March 12, 1987
- Neil Diamond – May 4, 1987, December 7, 1993 and November 17, 1996
- The Monkees – July 9, 1987, with "Weird Al" Yankovic
- Mötley Crüe – July 10, 1987 with Whitesnake, July 25, 1990, November 5, 1997 and April 30, 2005
- Boston – October 24, 1987, with Fahrenheit
- Amy Grant – November 3, 1988, with Russ Taff, December 13, 1999, with Michael W. Smith, Point of Grace and The Katinas
- Bon Jovi with Skid Row – April 10, 1989
- Tesla – September 12, 1989 and July 29, 1992, with FireHouse
- Queensrÿche with Suicidal Tendencies – April 29, 1991 and June 16, 1995, with Type O Negative
- The Damn Yankees – July 16, 1991
- Billy Ray Cyrus – December 6, 1992
- King's X – April 30, 1994, with Therapy?
- John Denver – August 11, 1995
- Bush – March 6, 1996, with No Doubt and The Goo Goo Dolls
- No Doubt – June 3, 1996
- Pantera – August 1, 1996, with White Zombie and The Deftones
- The Smashing Pumpkins – August 31, 1996
- OzzFest – October 10, 1996
- 311 – November 11, 1997, with Sugar Ray and Incubus and March 27, 2000, with Jimmie's Chicken Shack
- Garth Brooks – November 13–16, 1997
- God Lives Underwater – May 8, 1998
- Gravity Kills – August 22, 1998
- Shania Twain – October 27, 1998, with Leahy
- NSYNC – April 10, 1999, with Britney Spears and B*Witched
- Korn – April 22, 1999, with Rob Zombie and Videodrone and November 24, 2002, with Disturbed, Trust Company, Earshot and Marz
- Elton John – February 9, 2000
- The Dixie Chicks – October 10, 2000, with Patty Griffin
- Creed – October 13, 2000 and May 2, 2002, with 12 Stones and Default
- Marilyn Manson – December 13, 2000, with gODHEAD and The Union Underground
- Matchbox 20 – March 25, 2001, with Everclear and June 23, 2003, with Sugar Ray
- Godsmack – March 26, 2001, with Staind, Cold and Systematic
- Poison – June 26, 2001, with Warrant, Quiet Riot and Enuff Z'nuff
- The Army of Freshmen – July 8, 2001
- 3 Doors Down – August 1, 2001, with Lifehouse and Tantric
- Music as a Weapon – October 12, 2001 and April 24, 2003
- Projekt Revolution – January 30, 2002 and July 30, 2003
- Ludacris – April 16, 2002, with Ja Rule, Ashanti and Toya
- The Honda Civic Tour – April 24, 2002
- Weezer – May 7, 2002, with Pete Yorn and AM Radio
- The Eagles – July 10, 2002
- Tool – July 24, 2002, with Tomahawk and May 11, 2007
- Snoop Dogg – September 21, 2002 and April 19, 2005, with Game
- Cher – September 30, 2002, with Cyndi Lauper and March 14, 2003, with Tommy Drake
- Toby Keith – March 13, 2003, with Rascal Flatts and Amy Dalley and October 16, 2004, with Tracy Lawrence
- 50 Cent – April 16, 2003
- The Trans-Siberian Orchestra – November 20, 2003, November 24, 2004, December 7, 2007, December 5, 2008 and November 2, 2009
- Yanni – March 12, 2004
- Alan Jackson & The Strayhorns – April 2, 2004, with Martina McBride
- Josh Groban – May 6, 2004
- Kid Rock and Twisted Brown Trucker – May 20, 2004, with Puddle of Mudd, March 10, 2006 and April 25, 2008, with Peter Wolf
- A Perfect Circle – June 11, 2004, with The Mars Volta and The Burning Brides
- Incubus – July 25, with Sparta and The Vines and November 18, with The Music, 2004
- Hilary Duff – August 22, 2004
- Crosby, Stills & Nash – August 31, 2004
- Metallica – September 1, 2004, with Godsmack
- Tim McGraw – September 15, 2004, with Big & Rich and The Warren Brothers
- Rascal Flatts – December 11, 2004, with Chris Cagle, Julie Roberts and Uncle John's Band and March 2, 2006, with Blake Shelton
- Steven Curtis Chapman – March 18, 2005, with Chris Tomlin and The Casting Crowns
- Slipknot – March 29, 2005, with Lamb of God and Shadows Fall
- Rhonda Vincent – April 28, 2005
- Union Station – August 18, 2005, with Jerry Douglas
- Brad Paisley and The Drama Kings – October 23, 2005, with Sugarland and Sara Evans
- Mannheim Steamroller – November 22, 2005
- Lil Wayne – December 18, 2005, with T.I. and Jeezy
- Nickelback – February 9, 2006, with Chevelle and Trapt
- Nine Inch Nails – March 27, 2006, with The Moving Units and Saul Williams
- Rob Zombie – July 9, 2006, with Anthrax and December 22, 2008
- The Wiggles – August 8, 2006 (2 shows)
- Rodney Carrington – November 18, 2006 and May 8, 2009
- The Gaither Homecoming – February 10, 2007
- Earth, Wind & Fire – March 31, 2007
- The Blue Man Group – April 1, 2007, with Mike Relm and April 13, 2008, with Mike Relm
- KDGS Power 93.9's Freaknic Jam – April 6, 2007 and March 21, 2008
- Martina McBride – May 27, 2007, with Rodney Atkins and Little Big Town
- Hinder – July 26, 2007, with Papa Roach, Buckcherry and The Exies and September 4, 2008, with 3 Doors Down and Finger Eleven
- Sara Evans – September 15, 2007
- Gary Allan – September 30, 2007, with Cross Canadian Ragweed
- Dierks Bentley – November 8, 2007, with Jack Ingram
- The Road Hammers – January 19, 2008
- Reba McEntire – January 31, 2008, with Kelly Clarkson and Melissa Peterman
- Casting Crowns – February 4, 2008
- Three Days Grace – February 28, 2008, with Seether and Breaking Benjamin
- Keith Urban – March 6, 2008, with Carrie Underwood and July 10, 2009, with Jason Aldean
- Saltimbanco – March 26–30, 2008
- Joe Cocker – April 12, 2008
- Gladys Knight – July 3, 2008
- Joe Nichols – September 13, 2008
- Avenged Sevenfold – September 23, 2008, with Buckcherry, Shinedown and Saving Abel
- Michael Bublé – October 10, 2008
- The Rock & Worship Roadshow – April 10, 2009
- The Summerslam Festival – August 16, 2009 with KoЯn, Mudvayne, Static-X, Black Label Society, Dope, Suicide Silence, Bury Your Dead

=== Other events ===
- Monster Jam Thunder Nationals – January 13–15, 2006 and January 9–11, 2009
