= Mid-Missouri Outlaws =

Professional indoor football team

Logo

General information
- Founded: 2006
- Folded: 2013
- Headquartered: Mathewson Exhibition Center in Sedalia, Missouri
- Colors: Blue, Black, White

Personnel
- Owners: Chad Jackson; Ethan Henson; Trish Henson
- General manager: Ben Lyles
- Head coach: Ben Lyles

Team history
- Mid-Missouri Outlaws (2006–2013)

Home fields
- Mathewson Exhibition Center (2013)

League / conference affiliations
- Central Plains Football League (2007–2009): East Division (2008); American Professional Football League (2010–2012) Champions Professional Indoor Football League (2013–2014)

Championships
- League championships: 3: CPFL: 2007, 2008, 2009

Playoff appearances (6)
- CPFL: 2007, 2008, 2009; APFL: 2010, 2011, 2012

The Mid-Missouri Outlaws were a professional indoor football team which began play in 2006 and were a charter member of the Champions Professional Indoor Football League. Based in Sedalia, Missouri, the Outlaws played their home games at the Mathewson Exhibition Center at the Missouri State Fairgrounds.

== History ==
The Outlaws joined the CPFL in 2006 as an expansion team before joining the American Professional Football League in 2010. The Outlaws played for three seasons in the APFL before joining the CPIFL for the 2013 season. The owners of the Outlaws were Chad Jackson, and Ethan and Trish Henson. The Outlaws played their home games at the Mathewson Exhibition Center in Sedalia. The Outlaws did not return to the CPIFL in 2014.

== Final roster ==
Mid-Missouri Outlaws roster
Quarterbacks
- 15 Kyle Christian
- 4 Damien Dunning

Running backs

- 31 Gary Helms
- 1 Marcus James
- 25 Charles McDonald

44 Jake Drenon

Wide receivers

- 8 Ronnie Celestine
- -- Antonio Chartman
- 16 Terry Dennis
- -- Lynell Payne
- 3 Josh Reid
- 5 Brandon Williams

Offensive linemen
- 65 Micah Brimer
- 52 Seth Brimer
- 55 Tony Vaka

Defensive linemen

- 6 Tenney Barber
- 24 Trey Jackson
- 97 Rahim Martin
- 95 Terry Wood

Linebackers
- 11 Joe Niehart

44 Jake Drenon

Defensive backs

- 28 Justin Barth
- 7 Gregory Brooks
- 9 Ken Davis
- 19 Kenny Stokes
- -- Antonio Chatman
- 26 Willie Reed
- -- Brandon Keoppel

Kickers

- 23 Derek Doerfler

Multiple Positions
- -- James Cody (RB/WR)
- -- Jahmikal Edwards (DL/OL)

Injured Reserve

- 99 Jeff Clancy
- 2 Colton Miller
- 29 Jajwan Sheilds

Exempt List

- Currently vacant

Practice Squad

- Currently vacant
- Rookies in italics
- Roster updated May 8, 2013
- 28 Active, 3 Inactive, 0 PS

== Season-by-season ==
Season records
Season	W	L	T	Finish	Playoff results
Mid-Missouri Outlaws (CPFL)
2006	2	1	0	Exhibition season	N/A
2007	8	1	0	1st, League	Won CPFL Championship (Missouri)
2008	11	2	0	1st, East Division	Won quarter-final (Topeka); Won semi-final (Missouri); Won CPFL Championship (Independence)
2009	12	0	0	1st, League	Won semi-final (Missouri); Won CPFL Championship (Independence)
Mid-Missouri Outlaws (APFL)
2010	8	3	0	2nd, League	Won semi-final (Springfield); Lost APFL Championship (Iowa)
2011	4	6	0	3rd, League	Lost semi-final (Iowa)
2012	7	5	0	4th, League	Lost semi-final (Sioux City)
Mid-Missouri Outlaws (CPIFL)
2013	0	12	0	10th, League	Failed To Make Playoffs
Totals	59	33	0	(including playoffs)	

== 2013 ==
The Outlaws opened the 2013 season to a poor 0-3 record, with losses to Lincoln, Bloomington, and Salina. Their loss to Bloomington was a massive 51-point blowout, in which the Outlaws only scored 3 points.

=== Season schedule ===
Week	Date	Kickoff	Opponent	Results	
Week	Date	Kickoff	Opponent	Final Score	Team Record
1	Bye				
2	March 17 (Sun)	4:30pm	Lincoln Haymakers	31-38	0-1
3	March 22 (Fri)	7:05pm	@Bloomington Edge	3-54	0-2
4	March 30 (Sat)	7:30pm	@Salina Bombers	21-43	0-3
5	April 6 (Sat)	7:30pm	Kansas Koyotes	18-49	0-4
6	April 14 (Sun)	7:30pm	@Oklahoma Defenders	34-36	0-5
7	April 20 (Sat)	7:30pm	Kansas City Renegades	24-38	0-6
8	April 27 (Sat)	7:30pm	Wichita Wild	9-82	0-7
9	May 4 (Sat)	7:30pm	@Omaha Beef	13-68	0-8
10	May 11 (Sat)	7:05pm	@Sioux City Bandits	6-56	0-9
11	Bye				
12	May 25 (Sat)	7:30pm	Bloomington Edge	6-46	0-10
13	June 1 (Sat)	7:30pm	Salina Bombers	23-48	0-11
14	June 8 (Sat)	7:05pm	@Wichita Wild	16-74	0-12
