= Clayton Holmes =

American football player (born 1969)

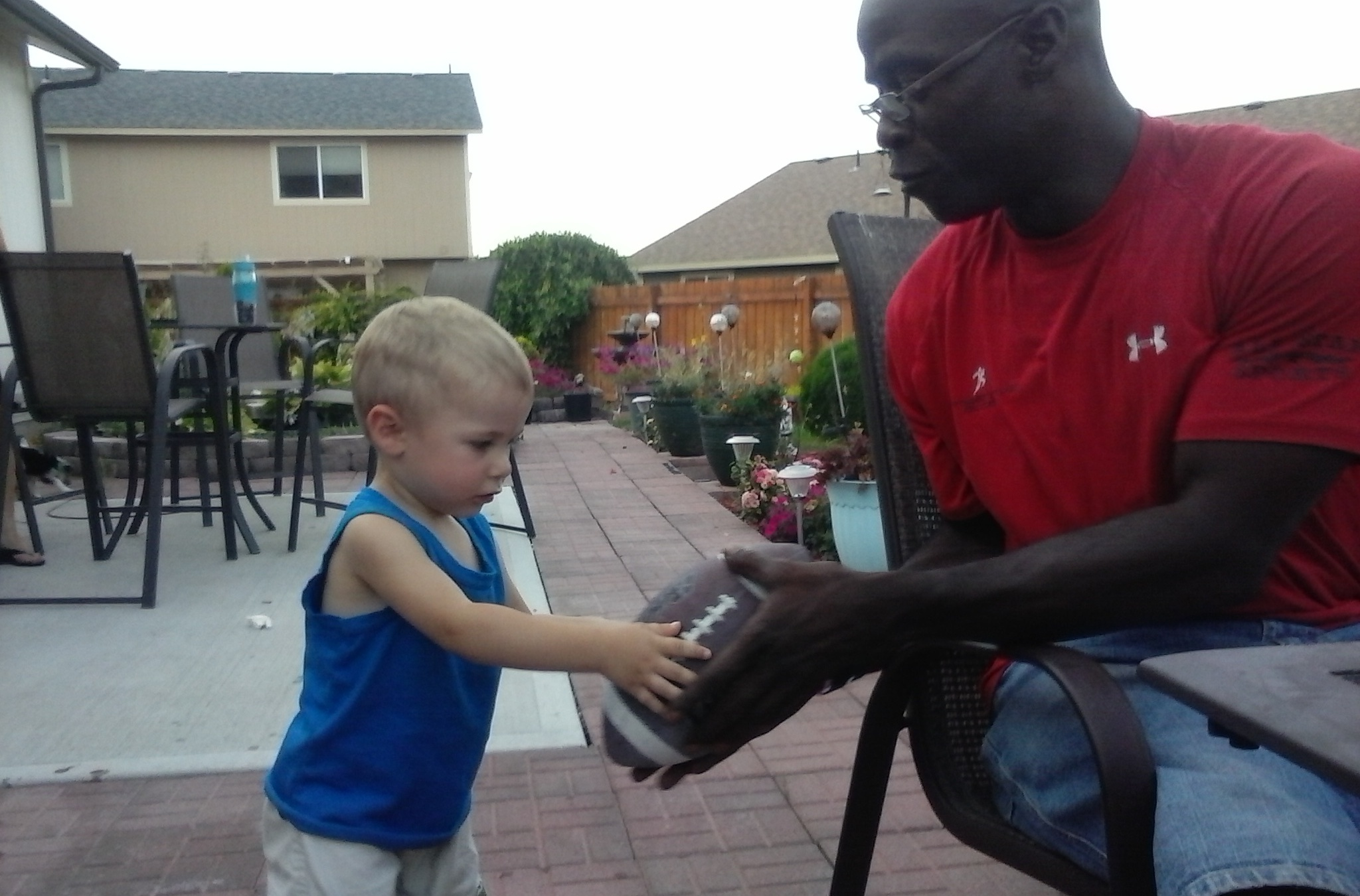
- Holmes (right) in 2014

No. 47
- Position: Cornerback

Personal information
- Born: August 23, 1969 (age 57); Florence, South Carolina, U.S.
- Listed height: 5 ft 10 in (1.78 m)
- Listed weight: 181 lb (82 kg)

Career information
- High school: Wilson (Florence)
- College: Carson–Newman
- NFL draft: 1992: 3rd round, 58th overall pick

Career history
- Dallas Cowboys (1992–1995); Miami Dolphins (1997); Topeka Knights (1999); Tennessee Thundercats (2000-2002); Kansas Koyotes (2003–2004)

Awards and highlights
- 3× Super Bowl champion (XXVII, XXVIII, XXX); SAC Defensive Player of the Year (1991); 2× NAIA All-American (1990, 1991); Little All-American (1991); 2× All-SAC (1990, 1991)

Career NFL statistics
- Tackles: 41
- Interceptions: 1
- Fumble recoveries: 2
- Stats at Pro Football Reference

Clayton Holmes (born August 23, 1969) is an American former professional football player who was a cornerback in the National Football League (NFL) for the Dallas Cowboys. He was selected in the third round of the 1992 NFL draft. He played college football at Carson-Newman College.

== Early life ==
Holmes attended Wilson High School in Florence, South Carolina, where he was a wishbone quarterback. He received All-conference honors at both quarterback and defensive back. He also lettered in baseball, track (long jump) and tennis. He set the South Carolina state record in the long jump.

== College career ==
Because of grades, he enrolled at North Greenville Junior College where he was the starting quarterback and a Junior College All-American. After two years, he transferred to Carson-Newman College, where he was converted into a cornerback.

As a junior, he contributed to a 10–0 regular season record. He led the team in both interceptions (6), passes defensed (17) and interceptions returned for a touchdown (2-school record). He established a school and a NAIA single-season record with 263 yards in interception returns. He also earned NAIA All-American honors in the long jump.

As a senior in 1991, he became one of the NAIA top football players, finishing second in the NAIA and tied the school single-season record with eight 8 interceptions. His 199 yards in interception returns gave him 462 for a school career-record. He received the South Atlantic Conference's Defensive Player of the Year award, Little All-American honors and also played in the Blue–Gray Football Classic.

== Professional career ==
=== Dallas Cowboys ===
Holmes was selected by the Dallas Cowboys in the third round (58th overall) of the 1992 NFL draft. As a rookie, he was the fastest player on the team and was used mostly on special teams, finishing second on the team with 15 tackles and also registering a fumble recovery in Super Bowl XXVII.

On August 14, 1993, during the first pre-season game, he suffered a torn anterior cruciate ligament in his right knee and was lost for the season.

In 1995, he started 6 games at cornerback in place of an injured Kevin Smith, while free agent Deion Sanders reached a contract agreement with the Dallas Cowboys. That same year in November, the NFL suspended him for four games for violating the league's substance-abuse policy. A week later, the suspension was increased to one year.

While suspended, he incurred in a fifth violation of the NFL's substance abuse policy and was suspended for 4 additional games. On February 10, 1996, he was released from the team.

=== Miami Dolphins ===
Holmes signed with the Miami Dolphins on February 26, 1997, reuniting him with former Cowboys head coach Jimmy Johnson. Looking to play for the first time since November 1995, he failed another drug test that resulted in a 4-game suspension and his eventual release on October 13, 1997.

=== Topeka Knights ===
In 1999, he played for the Topeka Knights of the Indoor Football League.

=== Tennessee Thundercats ===
From 2000 to 2002, Holmes played for the Tennessee Thundercats of the National Indoor Football League.

=== Kansas Koyotes ===
In 2003, he signed with the Kansas Koyotes of the American Professional Football League, where he played for two seasons.

== Personal life ==
Holmes filed suit against the NFL for involuntarily enrolling him in a drug treatment program, after he tested positive for marijuana, but his claim was dismissed. His post-football life became a turbulent mix of personal problems and financial difficulties but he has got his life back on track since.
