= Brightspeed Ice Park =

Arena in Springfield, Missouri

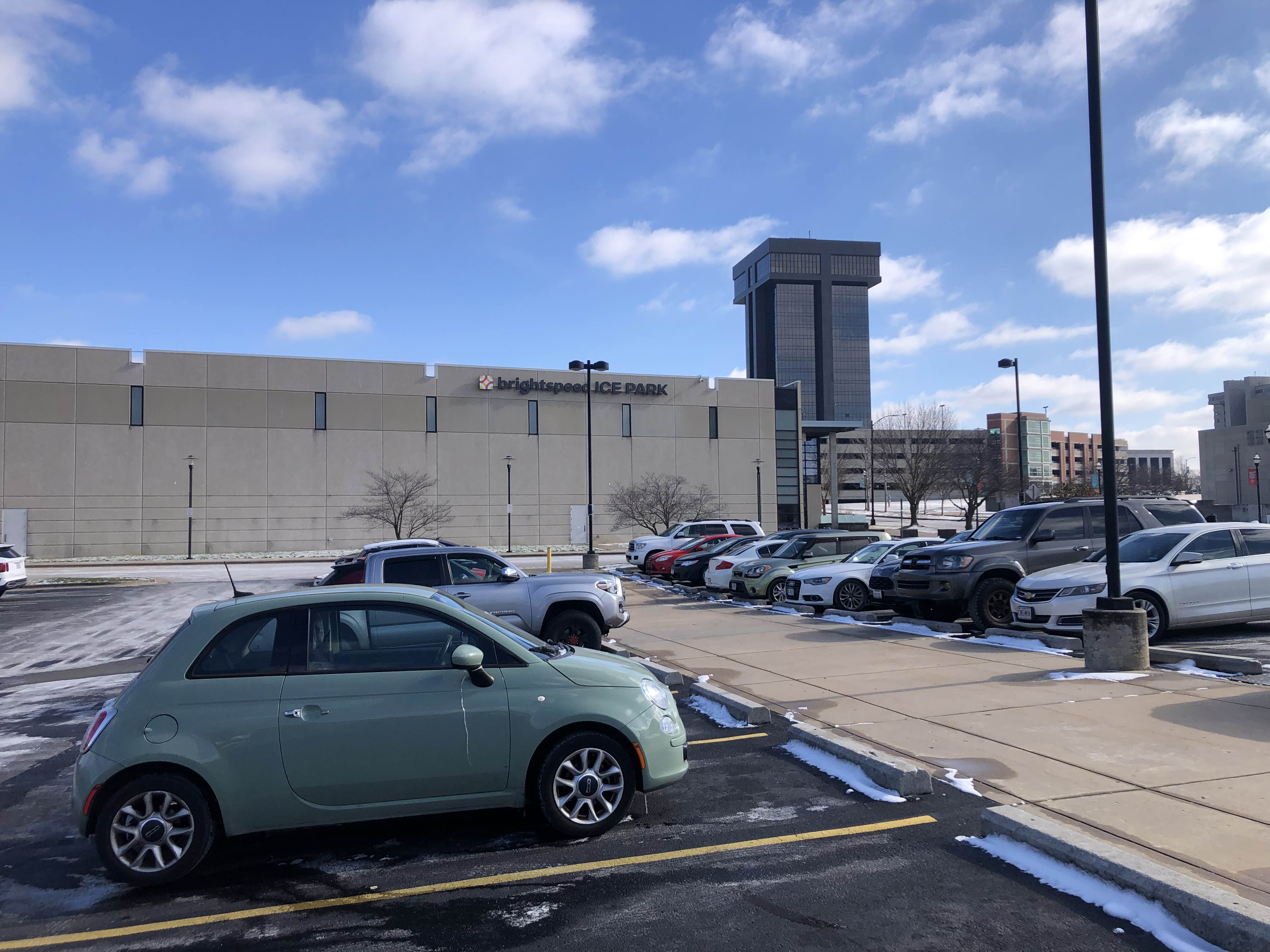
- Exterior of Brightspeed Ice Park in 2025
- Interactive map of Brightspeed Ice Park
- Former names: Jordan Valley Ice Park (2001–2008, 2019–2024); Mediacom Ice Park (2008–2019)
- Location: Springfield, Missouri
- Coordinates: 37°12′38″N 93°17′05″W
- Owner: Springfield-Greene County Park Board
- Capacity: 2,000
- Surface: 2 rinks: 200' × 85' (hockey)
- Public transit: Springfield Transit Services

Construction
- Opened: 2001

Tenants
- Missouri State Ice Bears; Springfield Spirit (NAHL) (2001–2005); Springfield WolfPack (APFL) (2007–2012); Springfield Express (WSHL) (2014–2018)

Brightspeed Ice Park (formerly known as Jordan Valley Ice Park and Mediacom Ice Park) is a multi-purpose indoor arena located in downtown Springfield, Missouri, featuring two NHL-sized indoor ice rinks. The arena is owned and operated by the Springfield-Greene County Park Board and offers ice sports, including public skate sessions, Learn to Skate, figure skating and ice hockey, as well as roller derby in the summer. The ice park is home to the Missouri State Ice Bears ice hockey team, Drury University Ice Hockey, Jordan Valley Figure Skating Club, and various youth sports programs.

The facility has had three names since it opened as Jordan Valley Ice Park in 2001. In 2008, it was renamed to Mediacom Ice Park, following a 10-year naming rights agreement with Mediacom, a cable television and communications provider in the United States. This agreement expired in 2019, whereupon the arena reverted to its original name. In 2024, the name became Brightspeed Ice Park, reflecting a 10-year naming rights agreement with Brightspeed Fiber Internet.
