= Anime NebrasKon =

Anime convention held in Council Bluffs, Iowa, U.S.

Coordinates: 41°14′15.0″N 95°53′23.0″W

- Status: Active
- Genre: Anime, popular culture
- Venue: Mid-America Center
- Location: Council Bluffs, Iowa
- Country: United States
- Inaugurated: 2004
- Organizer: Nebraska Japanese Animation Society
- Website: animenebraskon.com

Anime NebrasKon is an annual three-day anime convention held during October at the Mid-America Center in Council Bluffs, Iowa. It is organized by the Nebraska Japanese Animation Society.

== Programming ==
The convention typically offers an artist's alley, anime idol, anime music video contest, cosplay contests, cosplay masquerade, dance/rave, dating auction, dealer's room, game room (video, tournaments, tabletop), formal ball, human chess, panels, and talent shows. The convention raised $2,600 for Big Brothers Big Sisters during the 2012 charity auction. Charity auctions prior to 2012 raised around $1,000 which was donated to Make-a-Wish and Open Door Mission. The convention's charity events in 2015 benefited the National Alliance on Mental Illness and raised around $7,500. Basset and Beagle Rescue of the Heartland was 2018's charity. The conventions charity events in 2022 benefited The Trevor Project.

== History ==
Anime NebrasKon was founded by the members of University of Nebraska-Lincoln's anime club (Otaku Jinrui) in 2004 as a fund-raising project and had 300 attendees at the first convention. Due to the convention's growth, in 2009 it moved to the Holiday Inn Omaha Convention Center in Omaha, Nebraska, and added 24-hour programming. Weddings have been held at the convention in both 2010 and 2011. The dealers room was expanded in 2012 because of renovations at the Ramada. An attendee on the way to the convention in 2012 was briefly detained by police after entering a bank wearing cosplay from the series Resident Evil. For 2016, the convention moved to La Vista in order to accommodate growth. Anime NebrasKon 2020 was cancelled due to the COVID-19 pandemic.

=== Event history ===
Dates	Location	Atten.	Guests
October 9, 2004	University of Nebraska–Lincoln; Lincoln, Nebraska	300	
November 4–6, 2005	University of Nebraska–Lincoln; Lincoln, Nebraska	500 (est)	Matt Burke, Tiffany Grant, Jan Scott-Frazier, and Shannon Townsend.
November 17–19, 2006	University of Nebraska–Lincoln; Lincoln, Nebraska		Steve Bennett, Tiffany Grant, Kyle Hebert, Jan Scott-Frazier, Richard Townsend, and Shannon Townsend.
November 16–18, 2007	University of Nebraska–Lincoln; Lincoln, Nebraska		Steve Bennett, Tiffany Grant, Matt Greenfield, Richard Townsend, and Shannon Townsend.
November 14–16, 2008	University of Nebraska–Lincoln; Lincoln, Nebraska		Tiffany Grant, Matt Greenfield, James Hatton, Richard Townsend, Shannon Townsend, and Kira Vincent-Davis.
November 6–8, 2009	Holiday Inn Omaha Convention Center (Coco Key Water Resort); Omaha, Nebraska	1,470	Buranden, Tiffany Grant, Matt Greenfield, Yuri Lowenthal, Tara Platt, Richard Townsend, and Shannon Townsend.
November 5–7, 2010	Holiday Inn Omaha Convention Center (Coco Key Water Resort); Omaha, Nebraska	2,100	Tiffany Grant, Jerry Jewell, Keith Silverstein, Richard Townsend, and Eric Vale.
November 4–6, 2011	Ramada Plaza Omaha Hotel & Convention Center (CoCo Key Water Resort) (Formerly the Holiday Inn); Omaha, Nebraska		David Brehm, Chris Cason, Tiffany Grant, Matt Greenfield, Christopher Sabat, Keith Silverstein, and Stephanie Young.
November 2–4, 2012	Ramada Plaza Omaha Hotel & Convention Center; Omaha, Nebraska		Steve Blum, David Brehm, Richard Epcar, Kyle Hebert, Keith Silverstein, John Swasey, and Stephanie Young.
November 1–3, 2013	Ramada Plaza Omaha Hotel & Convention Center; Omaha, Nebraska		Dante Basco, Richard Epcar, Fredd Gorham, Wendy Powell, Keith Silverstein, April Stewart, and Alexis Tipton.
October 31 - November 2, 2014	Ramada Plaza Omaha Hotel & Convention Center; Omaha, Nebraska		Robert Axelrod, David Brehm, Chris Cason, Richard Epcar, Fredd Gorham, Kyle Hebert, Erica Mendez, Eric Stuart, Alexis Tipton, Cristina Vee, and Stephanie Young.
November 6–8, 2015	Ramada Plaza Omaha Hotel & Convention Center; Omaha, Nebraska		Bennett Abara, Amber Lee Connors, Fredd Gorham, Kyle Hebert, Chii Sakurabi, Keith Silverstein, Karen Strassman, Cristina Vee, and Doug Walker.
November 4–6, 2016	La Vista Conference Center; La Vista, Nebraska	6,530	Colleen Clinkenbeard, Aaron Dismuke, Caitlin Glass, Fredd Gorham, Todd Haberkorn, Cassandra Lee Morris, Kirby Morrow, Chii Sakurabi, Jad Saxton, Keith Silverstein, Sonny Strait, and Alexis Tipton.
November 10–12, 2017	Hotel RL Omaha; Omaha, Nebraska		Barbara Dunkelman, Kara Eberle, Katelyn Gault, Todd Haberkorn, Lindsay Jones, Erica Lindbeck, Elizabeth Maxwell, Kyle McCarley, Keith Silverstein, and Arryn Zech.
November 2–4, 2018	Ramada Plaza Omaha Hotel & Convention Center; Omaha, Nebraska	6,000 (est.)	Clifford Chapin, Aaron Dismuke, Chris Guerrero, Kyle Hebert, E. Jason Liebrecht, Mary Elizabeth McGlynn, Erica Mendez, Vic Mignogna, Tony Oliver, Ryter Rong, Cristina Vee, and David Vincent.
November 1–3, 2019	Ramada Plaza Omaha Hotel & Convention Center; Omaha, Nebraska	Almost 7,000	Leah Clark, Jerry Jewell, Brittney Karbowski, Lauren Landa, Erica Lindbeck, Joel McDonald, Xander Mobus, Ian Sinclair, Eric Vale, and Sarah Anne Williams.
October 22–24, 2021	Mid-America Center; Council Bluffs, Iowa		SungWon Cho, Kara Edwards, Fredd Gorham, Chris Hackney, Billy Kametz, Lisa Ortiz, Keith Silverstein, and Abby Trott.
October 21–23, 2022	Mid-America Center; Council Bluffs, Iowa		Kimberly Anne Campbell, Amber Lee Connors, Amanda Gish, Kellen Goff, Joel McDonald, Mary Elizabeth McGlynn, Daman Mills, Max Mittelman, Xander Mobus, Ciarán Strange, Kit Strange, and Strangecat Cosplay.
October 20-22, 2023	Mid-America Center; Council Bluffs, Iowa		Bryn Apprill, Katelyn Barr, Griffin Burns, Bill Butts, Khoi Dao, Lucien Dodge, Chris Hackney, Erica Lindbeck, Kristen McGuire, Risa Mei, Erica Mendez, Alejandro Saab, Lindsay Seidel, Keith Silverstein, Laura Stahl, and Ciarán Strange.
October 18-20, 2024	Mid-America Center; Council Bluffs, Iowa		Tia Ballard, Griffin Burns, Bill Butts, SungWon Cho, Aaron Dismuke, Chris Guerrero, Kyle Hebert, Brittney Karbowski, Mary Elizabeth McGlynn, Xander Mobus, and SnarkyJay.
October 17-19, 2025	Mid-America Center; Council Bluffs, Iowa		Edward Bosco, Barbara Dunkelman, Kara Eberle, Melanie Jasmine, Lindsay Jones, Michael Vincent Jones, Amanda "AmaLee" Lee, Pros and Cons Cosplay, Zeno Robinson, Jonah Scott, SnarkyJay, Ciarán Strange, Uptown Cosplay, and Arryn Zech.
October 16-18, 2026	Mid-America Center; Council Bluffs, Iowa		Edward Bosco, Hayden Daviau, Robbie Daymond, Kyle Hebert, Wendee Lee, Bryce Papenbrook, Alejandro Saab, Keith Silverstein, and David Vincent.

== NebKon Abridged ==
NebKon Abridged is a two-day event held during June at the Comfort Inn & Suites Omaha Central in Omaha, Nebraska.

=== Event history ===
Dates	Location	Atten.	Guests
July 9, 2022	DoubleTree by Hilton Hotel Omaha Downtown; Omaha, Nebraska		
July 6, 2024	Hilton Omaha; Omaha, Nebraska		
June 6-7, 2025	Comfort Inn & Suites Omaha Central; Omaha, Nebraska		Fredd Gorham and Thousand Faces Cosplay.

== Mascot ==
Anime NebrasKon's mascot is the Husker Ninja.
