= Jonathan Beasley =

American football player and coach

Current position
- Title: Director of Football Operations
- Team: Tarleton State
- Conference: FCS Independent

Biographical details
- Born: Glendale, Arizona, U.S.
- Education: Glendale (AZ) Cactus

Playing career
- 1996–2000: Kansas State
- 2001: Green Bay Packers
- 2001–2002: Saskatchewan Roughriders
- 2003: Jacksonville Jaguars
- 2004: Wichita Stealth
- 2005: Wichita Aviators
- Position: Quarterback

Coaching career (HC unless noted)
- 2006: Wichita North HS (RB/QB)
- 2006: Emporia State (GA)
- 2007–2008: Montana State (WR)
- 2009–2011: Kansas State (OGA)
- 2012–2015: Tarleton State (WR)
- 2016–2021: Tarleton State (RB/TE)
- 2022–Present: Tarleton State (DFO)

Accomplishments and honors

Awards
- Third-team All-Big 12 (2000)

Jonathan Beasley is an American football coach and former player. He played college football as a quarterback for the Kansas State Wildcats football team in 1999 and 2000. He currently serves as director of football operations at Tarleton State University.

== College career ==
Beasley was a two-year starter at Kansas State, compiling a 132.7 pass efficiency rating in 2000, the top mark in school history to that point. He threw for 33 touchdowns in his career and finished with 4,642 career passing yards. He holds the school record for most yards per completion for a game (23.9), season (20.1), and career (17.9) while also compiling a 21-4 record in two seasons as the Wildcat starting quarterback. He led K-State to the 2000 Big 12 Championship Game appearance against Oklahoma as a senior, and led the Wildcats to a win over Nebraska that same season by throwing a game-winning 12-yard scoring strike in the game's final three minutes.

== Professional career ==
Beasley played professionally for the Wichita Aviators in the American Professional Football League in 2005, the Wichita Stealth in Arena II in 2004, the Jacksonville Jaguars in 2003, the Detroit Lions also in 2003, and the Green Bay Packers in 2001. He also played for the Saskatchewan Roughriders of the Canadian Football League in 2001 and 2002.

== Coaching career ==
Beasley began coaching JV and freshman quarterbacks at Cactus High School his alma mater in Glendale, Arizona in 2003.The JV team finished 8-1 that season led by a freshman Quarterback who Beasley mentored and developed.

Beasley served as a graduate assistant at Emporia State as well as quarterbacks and running backs coach at Wichita North High School in 2006.

Beasley served as the wide receivers coach at Montana State in 2007 and 2008. The Bobcats went 7-5 this past season and 6-5 in Beasley’s first season on staff. As part of the Bobcat coaching staff, Beasley also assisted with the weekly implementation of the offensive game plan and served as the MSU Community Service Coordinator.

Beasley was an offensive graduate assistant at Kansas State under head coach Bill Snyder from 2009-2011.

He was hired to coach wide receivers at Tarleton State University in 2012.
