= Sioux City Bandits =

Professional indoor football team in Sioux City, Iowa

- Current season
Logo

General information
- Founded: 1999
- Headquartered: Tyson Events Center in Sioux City, Iowa
- Colors: Red, black, grey, & white
- Mascot: Slinger
- GoBandits.fun

Personnel
- Owner: Donald Belson
- Head coach: Erv Strohbeen
- President: Brett Funke

Team history
- Sioux City Attack (2000); Sioux City Bandits (2001–present)

Home fields
- Sioux City Municipal Auditorium (2000–2003); Tyson Events Center (2004–present)

League / conference affiliations
- Indoor Football League (2000); Western Conference (2000); Southern Division (2000); National Indoor Football League (2001–2004); Pacific Conference (2001–2004); Central Division (2001); Northern Division (2002–2004); United Indoor Football (2005–2008); Northern Division (2005); Western Division (2006–2008); Indoor Football League (2009–2010); United Conference (2009–2010); Central Division (2009); Central West Division (2010); American Professional Football League (2011–2012); Champions Professional Indoor Football League (2013–2014); Champions Indoor Football (2015–2023); Northern Division (2016); North Conference (2017–2019); National Arena League (2024–present)

Championships
- League championships: 3: APFL: 2011, 2012; CIF: 2015
- Conference championships: 1: CIF: 2018
- Division championships: 1: UIF: 2005

Playoff appearances (17)
- IFL: 2000; NIFL: 2004; UIF: 2005, 2006, 2008; APFL: 2011, 2012; CPIFL: 2013, 2014; CIF: 2015, 2016, 2017, 2018, 2021, 2022, 2023; NAL: 2024

The Sioux City Bandits are a professional indoor football team based in Sioux City, Iowa, and compete as a member of National Arena League (NAL). The team was founded in 1999 as the Sioux City Attack. In 2001, the team assumed their current name of the Bandits. The Bandits play their home games at the Tyson Events Center.

== History ==
In 2000, the Sioux City Attack joined the original Indoor Football League (IFL). After this season concluded, the Orlando Predators of the Arena Football League bought out all but two of the league's teams. Once they were founded, the Sioux City Bandits assumed identity of the Attack. The organization has played in eight different leagues including the original IFL (as the Attack), the National Indoor Football League (NIFL), United Indoor Football (UIF), the new Indoor Football League (IFL), American Professional Football League (APFL), the Champions Professional Indoor Football League (CPIFL), and then Champions Indoor Football (CIF).

Notable early team accomplishments include former Sioux City running back Fred Jackson being signed by the Buffalo Bills of the NFL. Jackson, out of Coe College, was the 2005 United Indoor Football's league leading rusher in which he set an indoor football record for most yards in a single season with more than 1,700. That year the Bandits hosted the championship game facing their rival Sioux Falls Storm. Sioux City had beaten Sioux Falls three times during the regular season but lost the championship game, 40–38.

After owning the team for 20 years, owner Bob Scott sold the Bandits to Missouri businessman J. R. Bond on 20 January 2021. After the 2021 season, Don Belson came on as the minority co-owner of the team. Belson had been associated with the team for nearly 20 years working in game day operations.

In July 2023, the Bandits announced they were leaving the CIF for a new league along with the Omaha Beef and the Topeka Tropics, the last of which would ultimately fold before the 2024 season. On August 8, 2023, the team announced they had joined the National Arena League (NAL) beginning with the 2024 season.

== Notable games ==
Date	Information
Friday, 31 March 2000	This was the date of the first indoor football game in franchise history. The Sioux City Attack traveled to Lincoln, Nebraska, but lost, 40–27.
Saturday, 8 April 2000	This date marks the first time that the Attack won a game, a 47–31 victory over the Sioux Falls Cobras at the Sioux Falls Arena. This was the beginning of the Sioux City/Sioux Falls indoor football rivalry.
Friday, 21 April 2000	This was the first home game in franchise history, a 59–27 victory over the Wichita Warlords at the Sioux City Municipal Auditorium.
Sunday, 14 August 2005	This date marked Sioux City's first championship game. They played their arch rival, Sioux Falls Storm in which they lost a thrilling heartbreaker, 40–38 in front of 6,840 fans.
Saturday, 5 April 2008	This date marked a regular season game for Sioux City, in which they hosted the Colorado Ice. It is notable for being the highest attendance ever recorded at a Sioux City Bandits/Attack home game, at 5,956.
Sunday, 29 May 2011	Sioux City defeated the Kansas City Matadors, 112–0. This was the first time in franchise history in which they did not allow any points. It was also the first time the franchise scored over 100 points. It is still their highest score to date.
Saturday, 9 July 2011	After they finished the regular season 12-0 and won in the semi-finals, Sioux City defeated the Iowa Blackhawks, to claim their first championship. The final score was 69–28, capping off a perfect 14–0 season.
Saturday, 14 July 2012	Sioux City won their second championship in a row, beating the Council Bluffs Express, 56–34, to earn yet another 14–0 season.
Friday, 22 March 2013	Sioux City won their 30th straight game. The milestone occurred over a 38–26 victory in a contest against the Kansas City Renegades. The streak would end at 31 with a loss at Omaha.
Saturday, 21 June 2014	Sioux City played in their fourth franchise championship game overall against the Wichita Wild in the CPIFL's Champions Bowl II. They lost 46–41.
Saturday, 20 June 2015	For the fourth time in five years, and fifth time overall, Sioux City played in their league's championship game. This year, it was the CIF's Champions Bowl I, as they hosted the Texas Revolution. They won 76–61, clinching their third franchise championship. All of these titles have come in a span of five years.

== Notable players ==
See Category:Sioux City Bandits players

=== Bandits Ring of Honor ===
#	Player	Position	Tenure	Honored
60	Darwin Bishop	OL/DL	2000–03	2003
3	Erv Whitehead	WR	2000–02	2003
42	Matt Hughes	LB	2000–02	2004
64	Carl Reinhardt	DL/Coach	2000–03	2004
12	Jarrod DeGeorgia	QB/Coach	2000, 2002–03, 2005	2006
40	Jesse Wavrunek	DL	2000–05	2006
5	Fred Jackson	RB	2004–05	2008
15	John Ostermeyer	WR	2002–03, 2005–08	2010
68	Steve Schmidt	OL/DL	2000–09, 2013–14	2010
55	Art Maulupe	DL	2000–07	2010
73	Erv Strohbeen	OL	2000–08	2010
51	Spetlar Tonga	LB	2004–08, 2010–13	2015
1	Alex Ardley	DB	2004–05, 2007–12	2016
5	Scott Jensen	QB	2009–14	2017
10	Damon Mothershead	WR	2007–16	2017
24	Johnny Bentley	RB		2018
23	Jon Smith	DB	2011–17	2019
3	Rahn Franklin, Jr	DB		2019
6	Marlon Lobban	LB	2011–17	2019

== Season-by-season ==
League champions	Conference champions	Division champions	Playoff berth	League leader

Season	Team	League	Conference	Division	Regular season			Postseason results
Season	Team	League	Conference	Division	Finish	Wins	Losses	Postseason results
Sioux City Attack
2000	2000	IFL	Western	Southern	3rd	9	5	Won First Round (Lincoln) 52–38; Lost Quarterfinal (Bismarck) 14–30
Sioux City Bandits
2001	2001	NIFL		Central	6th	4	10	Did not qualify
2002	2002	NIFL	Pacific	Northern	3rd	9	5	Did not qualify
2003	2003	NIFL	Pacific	Northern	3rd	6	8	Did not qualify
2004	2004	NIFL	Pacific	Northern	3rd	8	6	Lost First Round (Omaha) 40–46
2005	2005	UIF		Northern	1st	13	2	Won Quarterfinal (Ohio Valley) 52–17; Won Semifinal (Tennessee Valley) 42–37; Lost United Bowl I (Sioux Falls) 38–40
2006	2006	UIF		Western	3rd	6	9	Lost Quarterfinal (Rock River) 33–37
2007	2007	UIF		Western	5th	3	12	Did not qualify
2008	2008	UIF		Eastern	3rd	4	10	Lost Quarterfinal (RiverCity) 33–37
2009	2009	IFL	United	Central	5th	4	10	Did not qualify
2010	2010	IFL	United	Central West	4th	4	10	Did not qualify
2011	2011	APFL			1st	12	0	Won Semifinal (Kansas) 54–20; Won APFL Championship (Iowa) 69–28
2012	2012	APFL			1st	12	0	Won Semifinal (Mid-Missouri) 61–28; Won APFL Championship (Council Bluffs) 56–34
2013	2013	CPIFL			3rd	10	2	Lost Semifinal (Salina) 28–29
2014	2014	CPIFL			2nd	9	3	Won Semifinal (Salina) 66–37; Lost Champions Bowl II (Wichita) 41–46
2015	2015	CIF			1st	9	3	Won Semifinal (Amarillo) 83–52; Won Champions Bowl I (Texas) 76–61
2016	2016	CIF		Northern	3rd	7	5	Lost First Round (Bloomington) 45–65
2017	2017	CIF	North		1st	9	3	Won Quarterfinal (Bismarck) 82–43; Lost Conference Championship (Omaha) 45–55
2018	2018	CIF	North		2nd	9	3	Won Conference Semifinal (Quad City) 54–46; Won Conference Championship (Salina) 45–39; Lost Champions Bowl (Duke City) 27–31
2019	2019	CIF	North		3rd	8	5	Lost Quarterfinal (Omaha) 50–60
2020	2020	CIF	North		Season cancelled due to COVID-19 pandemic			
2021	2021	CIF			3rd	5	6	Lost Semifinal (Omaha) 39–40
2022	2022	CIF			1st	9	1	Lost Semifinal (Omaha) 45–49
2023	2023	CIF			5th	5	5	Lost Quarterfinal (Billings) 39–31
2024	2024	NAL			2nd	5	3	NAL Championship (Omaha)
Totals						179	126	All-time regular season record
Totals						13	14	All-time postseason record
Totals						192	140	All-time regular season and postseason record

== Head coaches ==
Name	Tenure	Regular season			Playoffs		Awards
Name	Tenure	W	L	Win%	W	L	Awards
Jim Anderson	2000	9	5	.643	1	1	
Phil Karpuk	2001	0	4	.000	0	0	
Carl Reinhardt	2001–2003	19	19	.500	0	0	
Art Haege	2004	4	4	.500	0	0	
Ervin Bryson	2004	4	2	.667	0	1	
Jose Jefferson	2005–2006	19	11	.633	2	2	
Richard Britt	2007	0	1	.000	0	0	
Roger Jansen	2007	3	6	.333	0	0	
Tom Luxford/Pat Arens	2007	0	5	.000	0	0	
Jarrod DeGeorgia	2008–2009	8	20	.286	0	1	
Tommie Williams	2010	4	8	.333	0	0	
Jarrod DeGeorgia/Erv Strohbeen	2010	0	2	.000	0	0	
Butch Faulkenberry	2011	12	0	1.000	2	0	APFL Coach of the Year (2011)
Erv Strohbeen	2012–present	92	36	.719	8	9	APFL Coach of the Year (2012); CPIFL Coach of the Year (2014); CIF Coach of the Year (2015)
