= Mid-America Center =

Convention center and arena in Council Bluffs, Iowa, U.S.

Coordinates: 41°14′15″N 95°53′23″W

- MAC
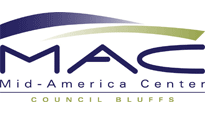
- Interactive map of Mid-America Center
- Former names: Mid-America Recreation and Convention Complex (planning/construction)
- Address: 1 Arena Way
- Location: Council Bluffs, Iowa, U.S.
- Owner: City of Council Bluffs
- Operator: Caesars Entertainment
- Capacity: Concerts: 9,000; Hockey: 6,793; Basketball: 7,000
- Surface: Multi-surface

Construction
- Groundbreaking: June 2001
- Opened: October 18, 2002
- Cost: $75 million ($134 million in 2025 dollars)
- Architect: HNTB
- Services engineers: DF&H Services, PLLC.
- General contractor: J.E. Dunn Construction Group

Tenants
- River City/Omaha Lancers (USHL) (2002–2009); Iowa Blackhawks (APFL) (2004–2011); Omaha Rollergirls (WFTDA) (2011–2012)

Website
- www.caesars.com/mid-america-center

Mid-America Center, commonly referred to as the MAC, is an arena and convention center located in Council Bluffs, Iowa, United States. The arena's maximum capacity is about 9,000 for concerts and 6,700 for ice hockey and arena football. The arena continues to provide free parking. Caesars Entertainment began managing the Center in 2012, taking over from SMG. It was the home of the Iowa Blackhawks of the APFL. From 2002 to 2009, it hosted the Omaha Lancers of the USHL. From February 19, 2011, to February 2013, it hosted roller derby bouts for the Omaha Rollergirls of the WFTDA.

== History ==
Mid-America Center was announced in August 1999, as the Mid-America Recreation and Convention Complex. Originally proposed as a 120,000 square feet (11,000 m^{2}) arena, it was comparably smaller to that of the then-under development Qwest Center in Omaha, Nebraska. Additionally, the Omaha Lancers were announced to become the first tenants of the arena, following the closure of the Hitchcock Arena. In November 2000, full plans for the arena were announced, with the intent to get $150 million from Vision Iowa.

Construction began in June 2001 and Mid-America Center officially opened on October 18, 2002. By 2006, Mid-America Center was losing needed $500,000 in city subsidies. Qwest Center, which opened in 2003, was also contributing factor to the arena's loss. In December 2011, it was announced that Harrah's Entertainment would take over as the operator of Mid-America Center. Harrah's took over as the operator on July 1, 2012.

== Tenants ==
=== Omaha Lancers ===
The Omaha Lancers of the United States Hockey League were the first home team in Mid-America Center. Originally speculated to move to the arena in 1999, the Lancers officially moved to the arena in 2002, following the closure of the Hitchcock Arena. The Omaha Lancers later moved back to Omaha at the former Omaha Civic Auditorium in 2009.

=== Iowa Blackhawks/Council Bluffs Express ===
The Iowa Blackhawks were an arena football team and a member of the American Professional Football League. Formed in 2004, the Blackhawks used Mid-America Center as their home arena. They later re-branded to the Council Bluffs Express in 2011. The team later moved to Lincoln, Nebraska and re-branded again to the Lincoln Haymakers.

=== Iowa Rampage ===
The Iowa Rampage of the Arena Football League was an arena football team that used Mid-America Center as their home arena. The team was formed in 2023 following the re-launch of the original AFL and they began playing in 2024. The team was abruptly folded that same year.

=== Other tenants ===
Along with its use as the home arena for several teams, Mid-America Center is also used to host several conventions and other sporting events. The center is used to host Anime NebrasKon. From February 19, 2011, to February 2013, it hosted roller derby bouts for the Omaha Rollergirls of the WFTDA.

== Layout ==
Mid-America Center has a 30,000 square feet (2,800 m^{2}) arena and a 24,500 square feet (2,280 m^{2}) exhibit hall. The arena also includes several entrances, a kitchen, and ten meeting rooms. In total, the arena can hold up to 2,750 people. Mid-America Center was designed by HNTB and was built by J.E. Dunn Construction.
