= Kansas Pavilions =

- Interactive map of Kansas Pavilions
- Location: Sedgwick County, Kansas
- Coordinates: 37.83609°N 97.321205°W
- Owner: Private Developer
- Operator: Sedgwick County Government

Construction
- Built: 1977
- Renovated: 2006, 2010
- Closed: 2016
- Architect: Thomas, Harris, Ash and Mason
- General contractor: Dondlinger & Sons Construction Co. INC

Kansas Pavilions was a public events complex located in unincorporated Sedgwick County, Kansas near the Wichita suburb of Park City, Kansas, USA. It hosted a number of equestrian, livestock, dog and car shows, as well as swap meets and flea markets. It ceased hosting events after 2016.

The Pavilions were once part of the Kansas Coliseum complex, which was built in 1977 and included the 9,686 seat Britt Brown Arena. The arena was closed in February 2010 after the opening of the INTRUST Bank Arena in downtown Wichita and the entire complex was sold to a private developer in 2012.

When the Britt Brown Arena closed, there was much public outcry to not close the Pavilions at the Kansas Coliseum. Members of the public who used the Pavilions frequently argued that the INTRUST Bank Arena and neighboring show places are not equipped to host "dirt" events, such as equestrian and livestock shows. On June 30, 2010, the Board of Sedgwick County Commissioners voted to keep the Pavilions open through at least 2016 and rename them the Kansas Pavilions.

The facility consisted of four pavilions and a 20-space, full-service RV park. When Sedgwick County residents voted to approve a 1-cent sales tax to build the INTRUST Bank Arena, they also voted to allocate part of those funds to renovate the pavilions at the Kansas Coliseum (now Kansas Pavilions). The renovation was carried out in 2006 and 2010 for $4.5 million. The principal facility was the Sam E. Fulco Arena with 135,000 square feet; other areas included Pavilion II with 90,000 square feet and the Arena Building with 45,000 square feet. There was also a covered dirt practice area.

The complex is now used by the aerospace testing facility for the National Institute for Aviation Research of Wichita State University.
