= Missouri Minutemen =

Defunct indoor football team

Missouri Minutemen

Founded
2003
Arena
-
Based in
St. Joseph, Missouri
Colors
Red, white, and blue
League
American Professional Football League
Head coach
Ronnie Jackson

Missouri Minutemen was an indoor football team that played in the American Professional Football League (APFL). The team started in 2003 as one of three original APFL teams. In 2003 and 2004, they played in the APFL Championship game, APFL Bowl I and II, losing to the Kansas Koyotes both times.

From 2004 through 2006, the team played in Sedalia, Missouri. In 2007, the team was to move to Saint Joseph, Missouri; issues with their arena, however, resulted in them playing only road games. In 2008, they played solely as a road team. The team folded after 2008 season.
