= Springfield WolfPack =

- Founded: 2002
- League: American Professional Football League
- Team history: SpringfieldWolfPack (2002-2012)
- Based in: Springfield, Missouri
- Arena: Mediacom Ice Park
- Colors: Red, Black, White
- Owner: Angela Edwards
- President: Angela Edwards
- Head coach: Troy McMain
- Championships: 0
- Dancers: Ball Babes
- Website: springfieldwolfpack.net

The Springfield WolfPack were an indoor football team based in Springfield, Missouri. The team played in the American Professional Football League (APFL). They folded along with the league in 2012. Home games were played at Mediacom Ice Park in Springfield, Missouri.

== Springfield WolfPack Season 2012 Schedule ==
Date	Time	Opponent	Location
Sat, 3/24/12	7:05 PM	Mid Missouri Outlaws	Mediacom Ice Park, Springfield, MO
Sat, 3/31/12	7:05 PM	Sioux City Bandits	Mediacom Ice Park, Springfield, MO
Sat, 4/07/12	7:05 PM	@ Kansas Coyotes	Kansas Expocentre, Topeka, KS
Sat, 4/21/12	7:05 PM	Council Bluffs Express	Mediacom Ice Park, Springfield, MO
Sat, 4/28/12	7:05 PM	@ Sioux City Bandits	Tyson Events Center, Sioux City, IA
Sat, 5/12/12	7:05 PM	Oklahoma Defenders	Mediacom Ice Park, Springfield, MO
Sat, 5/19/12	7:05 PM	Kansas Koyotes	Mediacom Ice Park, Springfield, MO
Sat, 5/26/12	7:05 PM	@ Oklahoma Defenders	Expo Square Pavilion, Tulsa, OK
Sat, 6/2/12	7:05 PM	@ Council Bluffs Express	Mid America Center, Council Bluffs, IA
Sat, 6/9/12	7:05 PM	Colorado Lightning	Mediacom Ice Park, Springfield, MO
Sat, 6/16/12	7:05 PM	@ Cheyenne Warriors	Wyoming Ice & Event Center, Cheyenne, WY
Sat, 6/23/12	7:05 PM	@ Mid Missouri Outlaws	Mathewson Center, Sedalia, MO
Sat, 7/7/12	7:05 PM	APFL Playoffs	TBA
Sat, 7/14/12	7:05 PM	APFL Playoffs	TBA
