= Kansas Koyotes =

Indoor football league (2003–2014)

Logo

General information
- Founded: 2003
- Folded: 2014
- Headquartered: Landon Arena in Topeka, Kansas
- Colors: Blue, silver, white

Personnel
- Owners: Ralph Adams (2003-13); Nick Baumgartner (2013-14)

Team history
- Kansas Koyotes (2003–2014)

Home fields
- Landon Arena (2003–2014)

League / conference affiliations
- American Professional Football League (2003–2012); Champions Professional Indoor Football League (2013–2014)

Championships
- League championships: 6: APFL: 2003, 2004, 2005, 2006, 2007, 2008

Playoff appearances (5)
- APFL: 2003, 2004, 2005, 2006, 2007, 2008, 2009, 2010, 2011

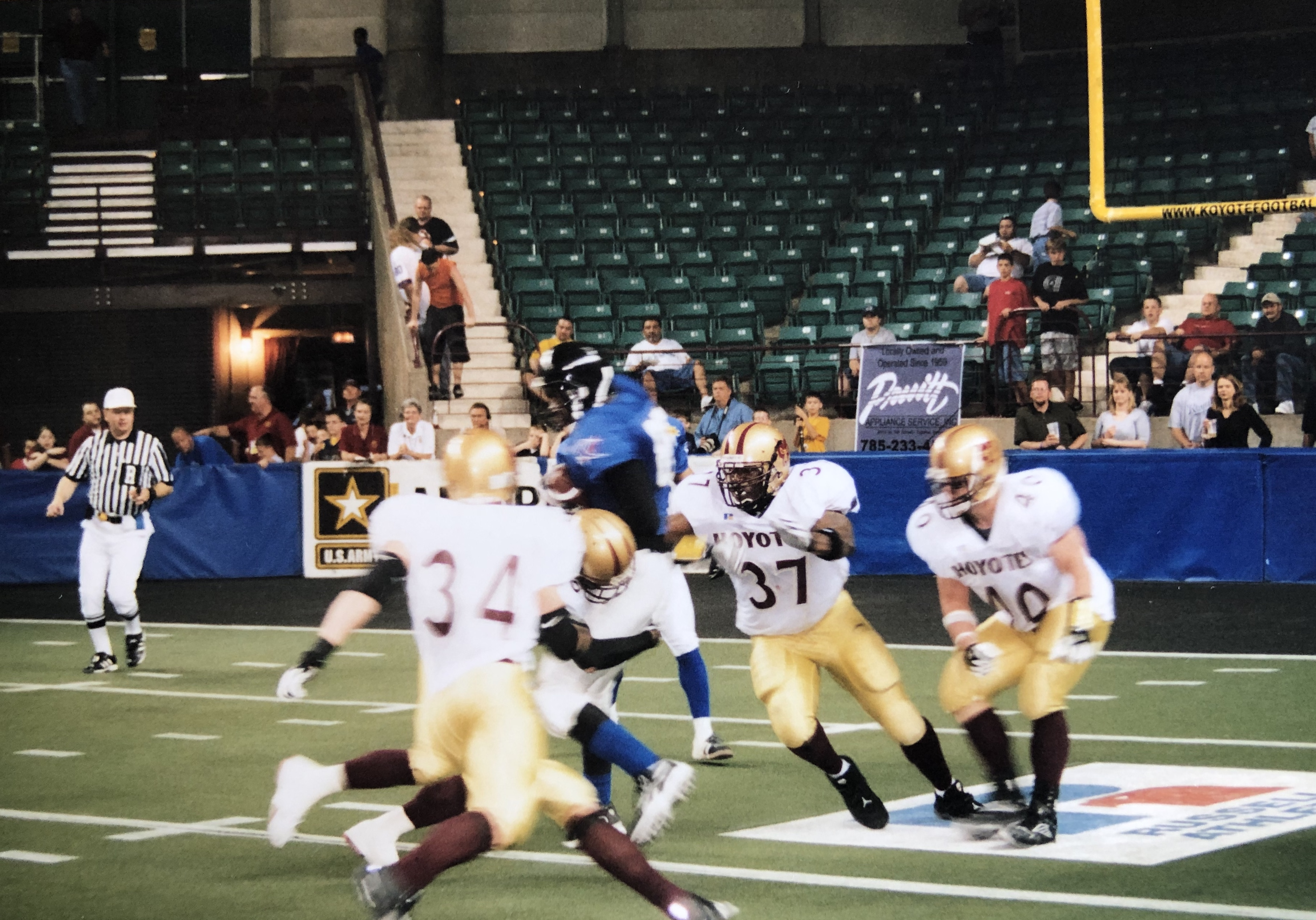
Kansas Koyotes vs Texas Thunder

The Kansas Koyotes, founded by Ralph Adams, were a professional indoor football and were a charter member of the Champions Professional Indoor Football League. Based in Topeka, Kansas, the Koyotes played their home games at Landon Arena.

The Koyotes began play in 2003 as a professional football team. Before joining the CPIFL, the Koyotes were a charter member of the former American Professional Football League, where they won the league's first six championships. Brian Hebert, the running back coach, dominated with five great running backs, led by Donnell Smith, and propelled the team to its first championship in 2003, which opened the door for future Koyotes championship teams. Former Dallas Cowboys Super Bowl champion Clayton Holmes played for the Koyotes in 2003.

== History ==
In their first four years of existence, the Koyotes dominated the APFL. They went undefeated in the 2003 and 2004 seasons, beating the Missouri Minutemen in the APFL Bowl both times. In the 2005 season, they went undefeated again, albeit being in many close games, winning their third APFL Bowl over the Iowa Blackhawks by a field goal kicked as time expired. . The winning streak lasted 31 games, including exhibition games and post-season games.

In 2006 the Koyotes finally lost their first game in Wichita, losing to the Wichita Aviators in the season opener. They would lose to the Aviators again, and finish second in the regular-season standings to the Aves. The two teams were going to play for APFL Bowl IV at the Wichita Ice Arena, for reasons that may never be clear, the league moved the game to Landon Arena. These were clear control issues that lead to the demise of the league.

In 2007, the Koyotes continued winning all their regular season home games and losing only two road games. They proceeded to win APFL Bowl V against Iowa Blackhawks. During the season, the Koyotes signed Abby Vestal as their kicker. On April 23, Vestal kicked three PATs, becoming the first woman to score points in a professional men's football game. Vestal, who signed a soccer scholarship for 2007 with Johnson County Community College in Overland Park, Kansas, would kick 6-9 PATs and go 0-2 in FGs.

Starting with the 2013 season, the Koyotes joined the Champions Professional Indoor Football League for two years. After joining the CPIFL, they finally took on true teams at a professional level, that lead to a 2-22 finish over their final two seasons. The Koyotes were up against competition at a true professional level after their years in the APFL.

The Koyotes announced after the 2014 season ended that they would leave the CPIFL and play 2015 as an independent team, playing eight home games. None of these games were played and the team apparently disbanded.

== Logos and uniforms ==
2003–2012

2013–2014

== Final roster ==
Kansas Koyotes roster
Quarterbacks: 4 Carlos Cavanagh; 8 Stanley Jennings; Running backs: 44 Ruston Phillips; 6 Elijah James; 11 Larry Wall; Wide receivers: 1 Chris Davis; 81 Terrance Dennis; 10 Terrell Downey; 9 Wayne Shepheard	Offensive linemen: 56 Kenny Ellison; -- Patrick Harrington; 53 John Kimble; 50 Kameron Neal; 55 Tony Vaka; Defensive linemen: 18 Furu Ambam; 99 Marcus Bolden; -- Cameron Jackson; 86 Austin Hamm; 3 Ben Pister	Linebackers: 20 Antonio Clay; 34 Jerald Marshall; 7 Kaito Miller; Defensive backs: 14 Jeff Colter; 12 Ryan Downey; 12 James Epps; 21 William Griffin; 30 Daniel King; 2 Jeremy Weston; 20 Willie Williams; Kickers: 16 Derek Doerfler	Reserve lists: 68 Porter Hill OL (DNR); 5 James Walker Jr. RB (DNR); Roster updated May 22, 2014; Transactions; 29 Active, 2 Inactive

== Season-by-season ==
Season records
Season	W	L	T	Finish	Playoff results
Kansas Koyotes (APFL)
2003	8	0	0	1st League	Won APFL Bowl I (Missouri)
2004	8	0	0	1st League	Won APFL Bowl II (Missouri)
2005	8	0	0	1st League	Won APFL Bowl III (Iowa)
2006	8	2	0	2nd League	Won Semifinals (Iowa); No Winner - APFL Bowl IV (Kansas vs Wichita)
2007	8	2	0	1st League	Won APFL Bowl V (Iowa)
2008	9	1	0	1st Northern	Won Semifinals (Iowa); Won APFL Bowl VI (Beaumont)
2009	8	2	0	1st League	Lost APFL Bowl VII (Iowa)
2010	4	4	0	4th League	Won APFL Qualifier (Junction City); Lost APFL Bowl VIII (Iowa)
2011	5	6	0	4th League	Lost APFL Semifinal (Sioux City)
2012	7	5	0	5th League	--
Kansas Koyotes (CPIFL)
2013	1	11	0	9th League	--
2014	1	11	0	9th League	--
Totals	84	47	0	(including playoffs)	

== 2014 ==
=== Season schedule ===
Week	Date	Kickoff	Opponent	Results	
Week	Date	Kickoff	Opponent	Final Score	Team Record
1	February 22 (Sat)	7:05pm	@Salina Bombers	8–75	
2	March 1 (Sat)	7:05pm	@Oklahoma Defenders	6–72	0–1
3	March 9 (Sun)	3:00pm	@Omaha Beef	27–55	0–2
4	Bye				
5	March 23 (Sun)	3:00pm	Salina Bombers	27–51	0–3
6	Bye				
7	April 5 (Sat)	7:05pm	Omaha Beef	30–52	0–4
8	Bye				
9	April 19 (Sat)	7:05pm	Oklahoma Defenders	55–64	0–5
10	April 26 (Sat)	7:05pm	Dodge City Law	12–33	0–6
11	May 3 (Sat)	7:05pm	@Bloomington Edge	42–43	0–7
12	May 9 (Fri)	7:05pm	@Lincoln Haymakers	17–54	0–8
13	May 17 (Sat)	7:05pm	@Wichita Wild	14–52	0–9
14	May 24 (Sat)	7:05pm	Sioux City Bandits	40–72	0–10
15	May 31 (Sat)	7:05pm	Oklahoma Defenders	75–63	1–10
16	June 7 (Sat)	7:05pm	@Dodge City Law	26–62	1–11

== 2013 ==
=== Season schedule ===
Week	Date	Kickoff	Opponent	Results	
Week	Date	Kickoff	Opponent	Final Score	Team Record
1	Bye				
2	March 16 (Sat)	7:30pm	Oklahoma Defenders	40-62	0-1
3	March 23 (Sat)	7:05pm	@Wichita Wild	20-39	0-2
4	March 30 (Sat)	7:30pm	@Omaha Beef	27-54	0-3
5	April 6 (Sat)	7:30pm	@Mid-Missouri Outlaws	49-18	1-3
6	April 12 (Fri)	7:30pm	Kansas City Renegades	28-56	1-4
7	Bye				
8	April 27 (Sat)	7:30pm	Bloomington Edge	0-48	1-5
9	May 4 (Sat)	7:30pm	Salina Bombers	31-55	1-6
10	May 11 (Sat)	7:30pm	@Oklahoma Defenders	20-48	1-7
11	May 18 (Sat)	7:30pm	@Salina Bombers	20-37	1-8
12	May 25 (Sat)	7:30pm	@Kansas City Renegades	28-82	1-9
13	June 1 (Sat)	7:30pm	Sioux City Bandits	23-48	1-10
14	June 8 (Sat)	7:30pm	Lincoln Haymakers	16-45	1-11
