= American Professional Football League =

Indoor gridiron football league

- Sport: Indoor football
- Founded: 2003
- Folded: 2013
- Director: Ted Adams
- President: Ralph Adams
- Country: United States
- Last champion: Sioux City Bandits
- Most titles: Kansas Koyotes (6)
- Related competitions: Champions Professional Indoor Football League; Continental Indoor Football League; Indoor Football League; Ultimate Indoor Football League

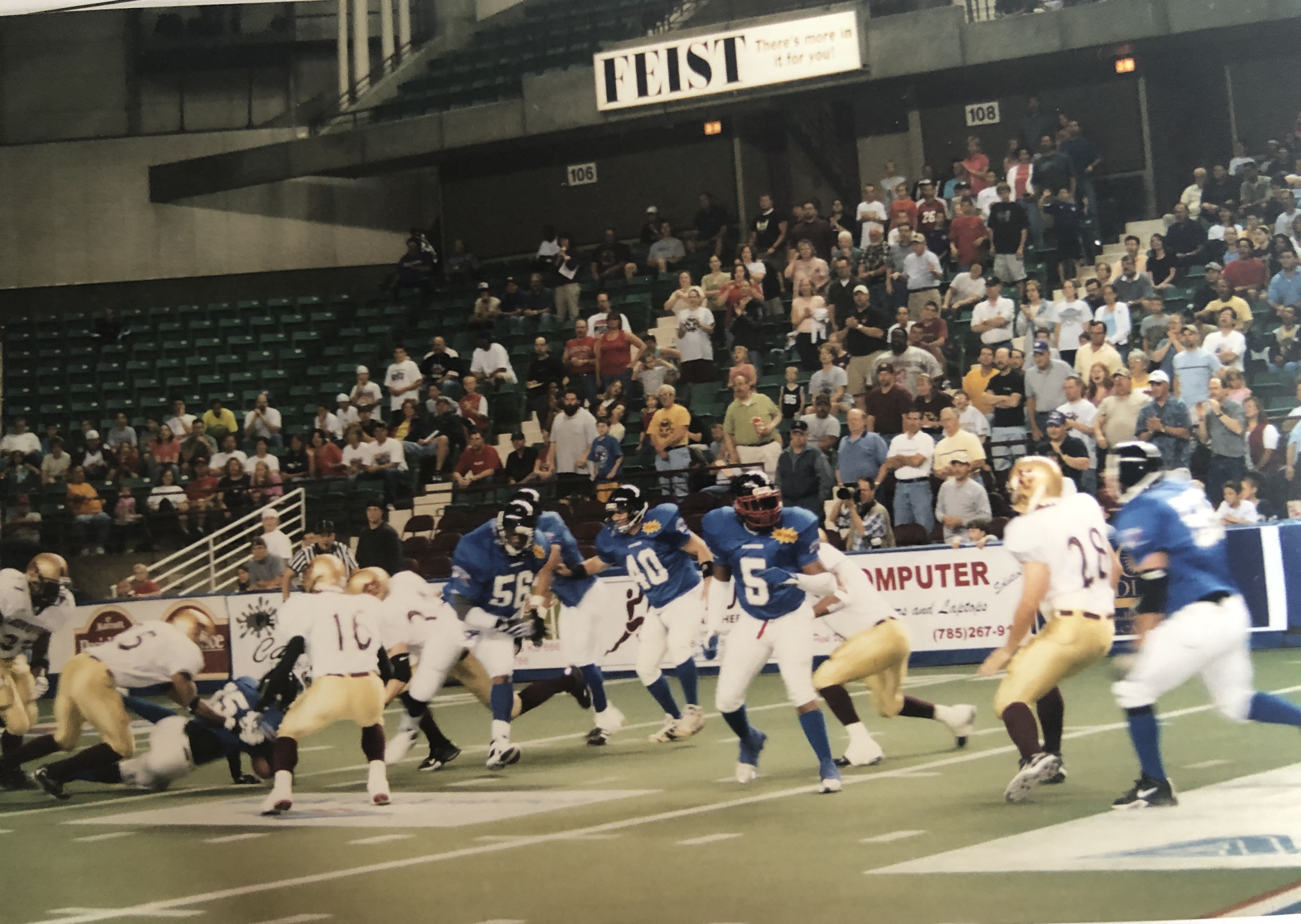
2004 Kansas Koyotes vs Texas Thunder

The American Professional Football League (APFL) was an indoor football league that was founded in 2003. After the 2012 season, most of the teams left to start the Champions Professional Indoor Football League. The league consisted of professional and semi-professional teams, with a few core teams that played a full 10 game schedule and other teams that played partial schedules. At the end of each season, the playoffs were contested between the league's core teams. The first few years of league play were dominated by the Kansas Koyotes, but in later years the league had more parity and more stable members, resulting in the first championship won by another team, the Iowa Blackhawks (in 2009), and the first championship game not involving the Koyotes, when the Iowa Blackhawks defended their championship against the Mid-Missouri Outlaws in the 2010 APFL season. Former Dallas Cowboys Super Bowl champion Clayton Holmes played for the Kansas Koyotes and former Kansas State star QB Jonathan Beasley played for the Wichita Aviators.

== League membership ==
- Beaumont Drillers (2008)
- Cheyenne Warriors (2012)
- Chillicothe Lumberjacks (2003, never played)
- Colorado Lightning (2012)
- Colorado Stars (2004, never played)
- Conroe Storm (2007–2008)
- Council Bluffs Express (2012)
- Denver Titans (2009)
- Florida Scorpions (2008–2009, 2011)
- Iowa Blackhawks (2004–2011)
- Kansas City Matadors (2011)
- Kansas Koyotes (2003–2012)
- Kansas/St. Joseph Storm (2005)^{a}
- Mid-Missouri Outlaws (2010–2012)
- Missouri Minutemen (2003–2008)
- Nebraska Bears (2005)
- Nebraska Extreme/Tornadoes (2008–2009)
- Nebraska Wildcats (2006)
- North Texas Crunch (2013–2014)
- Oklahoma Defenders (2012)
- Sioux City Bandits (2011–2012)
- Springfield Shield (2008, never played)
- St. Joseph Explorers (2003)
- Springfield Wolfpack (2007–2012)
- Texas Regulators (2007–2008)
- Texas Thunder (2004)
- Wichita Aviators (2005–2006)
- Wichita Falls Diablos (2008)
- Wisconsin Locomotives (2004, never played)

a. St. Joseph Storm was suspended from the league before the 2006 season began. Kansas City Thunderstorm and Columbia Outlaws played in their place.
b. This team only played road games and a reduced schedule.

== APFL Bowl champions ==
Year	Title	Champion	Score	Runner-up	Semi-finalist(s)
2003	APFL Bowl I	Kansas Koyotes	59-29	Missouri Minutemen	N/A
2004	APFL Bowl II	Kansas Koyotes	64-6	Missouri Minutemen	N/A
2005	APFL Bowl III	Kansas Koyotes	26-24	Iowa Blackhawks	Wichita Aviators
2006	APFL Bowl IV	No Winner	0-0*	Wichita Aviators-Kansas Koyotes	Iowa Blackhawks
2007	APFL Bowl V	Kansas Koyotes	39-15	Iowa Blackhawks	Conroe Storm
2008	APFL Bowl VI	Kansas Koyotes	62-36	Beaumont Drillers	Iowa Blackhawks (North), Conroe Storm (South)
2009	APFL Bowl VII	Iowa Blackhawks	63-17	Kansas Koyotes	Springfield Wolfpack
2010	APFL Bowl VIII	Iowa Blackhawks	31-28	Mid-Missouri Outlaws	Springfield Wolfpack, Kansas Koyotes
2011	APFL Bowl IX	Sioux City Bandits	69-28	Iowa Blackhawks	Mid-Missouri Outlaws, Kansas Koyotes
2012	APFL Bowl X	Sioux City Bandits	56-34	Council Bluffs Express	Oklahoma Defenders, Mid-Missouri Outlaws
2013	APFL Bowl XI	North Texas Crunch	N/A	N/A	N/A

* = forfeit

== History ==
=== 2003 ===
Early in 2003, the APFL started as a regional league with the Kansas Koyotes, Missouri Minutemen, St. Joseph Explorers, and Chillicothe Lumberjacks. However, the Lumberjacks didn't make it to opening day and as a result the league played on with three teams while Chillicothe was replaced on the schedule. The Koyotes went undefeated in the league's first season and won the championship game in a rout against Missouri, their 4th victory over the Minutemen that season.

=== 2004 ===
Kansas and Missouri returned and the league added the Iowa Blackhawks and Texas Thunder. The Colorado Stars and Wisconsin Locomotives were originally scheduled to compete, but neither played a down of football in the APFL. The Blackhawks were previously the River City Redemption, who had competed in an exhibition match against the Koyotes the season before. Texas only played a partial schedule. The Koyotes and Minutemen both made it back to the championship, and the Koyotes rolled to a second championship and undefeated season.

=== 2005 ===
The 2005 season saw the addition of the Kansas Storm, Nebraska Bears, and Wichita Aviators. The Thunder did not return and the league played with six teams. The league saw an increase in competition with these new teams and an improved team in Iowa. The Koyotes again captured the #1 seed and an undefeated regular season but had to win more close games than the previous two seasons. The Minutemen, twice the APFL runner-up, did not even make the playoffs. Iowa hosted Wichita in the semi-final and won 50–42 to earn a berth in the championship game. In a thrilling final, the Koyotes almost saw the championship slip away when the Blackhawks took a late lead. Jerry Lakin hit a game-winning field goal and Kansas completed their third consecutive undefeated season with a 26–24 win.

=== 2006 ===
The Nebraska Bears did not return the next year and the Nebraska Wildcats were added as a travel-only team. The Kansas Storm attempted to move to St. Joseph, Missouri but ended up not playing in 2006, causing the league to find replacements for their games on the schedule. The 2006 season started with a bang when Kansas finally lost, dropping their season opener against Wichita 50–43. The Aviators were the APFL regular season champions and had earned the right to host the championship game. After Kansas won their semi-final against the Blackhawks, the league decided to move the championship game to Landon Arena, home of the Koyotes. This controversial decision caused Wichita to boycott the championship game, resulting in a forfeit win for the Kansas Koyotes and leading to Wichita's exit from the league.

=== 2007 ===
The MAIFL champion Springfield Wolfpack and two new teams from Texas, the Conroe Storm and Fort Worth Regulators, joined the league for the 2007 season. The Regulators couldn't secure a home arena, and they only played road games in 2007. Conroe had a strong debut season, finishing 2nd in the regular season and earning a home playoff game. The season ended when they were upset in the semi-final by the visiting Blackhawks. Iowa's second championship appearance also ended in defeat, and the Koyotes claimed a 5th championship with a 39–15 victory.

=== 2008 ===
The APFL expanded ambitiously in 2008 to 10 teams, and split its teams into divisions for the first time. The Nebraska Extreme joined Iowa, Kansas, Missouri and Springfield in the Northern Division. The Wichita Falls Diablos and former NIFL members Beaumont Drillers and Florida Scorpions joined Conroe and Fort Worth in the Southern Division. The expansion was a flop and led to a disastrous season for the league. Arena problems and mismanagement plagued multiple teams throughout the league, resulting in a cancellation of the entire season for Ft. Worth. None of the Southern teams played more than half their schedule, and all of the teams in that division had either folded or were on the verge of folding by season's end. In the North, Nebraska and Missouri didn't have home arenas, but most of the scheduled games went on as planned. Kansas defeated Iowa in the Northern semi-final, and the Southern semi-final wasn't played but Beaumont went on to the APFL championship. With few of their original players available, the Drillers still traveled to Topeka for the championship and lost 62–36. The Drillers played better than some had expected them to given the circumstances, but it wasn't enough to stop the Koyotes from taking their sixth championship.

=== 2009 ===
In the 2009 season, all of the teams from the North except Missouri returned, and Florida was the only surviving member of the South. The Scorpions continued to play in the league as a travel-only team, as did the renamed Nebraska Tornadoes and new member Denver Titans. The core teams of Iowa, Kansas and Springfield played full schedules and participated in the playoffs. The Koyotes continued their streak of championship game appearances by defeating the Wolfpack in the semi-final. For the first time the championship was not held in Topeka when the regular season champion Blackhawks hosted the Koyotes. Iowa blew out Kansas 63–17 to earn their first championship.

=== 2010 ===
The Junction City Force and Mid-Missouri Outlaws joined the league in 2010. Junction City joined as a travel-only team and primarily played in the Central Plains Football League. The Outlaws came to the league after winning the CPFL title three years in a row and were also notable for defeating the Blackhawks in a matchup during the 2009 season. Iowa won the regular season title once again, and Mid-Missouri came in second during an impressive debut season. Kansas suffered through their worst season to date, finishing in 4th. The Koyotes won their play-in game against the Force, but lost to the Blackhawks in the semi-final. The Outlaws defeated the Wolfpack in the other semi-final, and the top two teams faced off in the championship. In the first championship game to go to overtime, Iowa came away with the victory on a game-winning kick from Jerry Lakin in a 31-28 thriller.

=== 2011 ===
In October 2010, the Sioux City Bandits announced that they were leaving the Indoor Football League for the APFL. In February 2011 the league added the Florida Scorpions and Kansas City Matadors as provisional members to fill out their 2011 schedule. That year, the Sioux City Bandits defeated the Kansas City Matadors 112–0.

=== 2012 ===
The Sioux City Bandits once again ended the season undefeated, up to the playoffs, with a 12–0 record.

=== 2013 ===
After the 2012 season, several teams left to start the Champions Professional Indoor Football League, including the Kansas Koyotes, which was sold off. An attempt was made at a 2013 season, but only one team, North Texas Crunch, played any kind of schedule. In 2015, the Crunch became one of four teams to join the North American Indoor Football League for its inaugural season.
