= Lincoln Haymakers =

Former indoor football team in Lincoln, Nebraska, U.S.

Logo

General information
- Founded: 2004
- Folded: 2014
- Headquartered: Lincoln, Nebraska at the Pershing Center
- Colors: Midnight Blue, Vegas Gold, Black & White
- Mascot: HayWire

Personnel
- Owner: Richard Tokheim

Team history
- Iowa Blackhawks (2004–2011); Council Bluffs Express (2012); Lincoln Haymakers (2013–2014)

Home fields
- Mid-America Center (2004–2012); Pershing Center (2013–2014)

League / conference affiliations
- American Professional Football League (2004–2012); Champions Professional Indoor Football League (2013–2014)

Championships
- League championships: 2: APFL: 2009, 2010

The Lincoln Haymakers were a professional indoor football team based in Lincoln, Nebraska, United States. The Haymakers played their 2013–2014 home games at the Pershing Center. The Haymakers were last coached by Cory Ross. The team was founded as the Iowa Blackhawks in 2004, and their home stadium was Mid-America Center in Council Bluffs, Iowa. They were originally a part of the American Professional Football League. The team later changed their name to the Council Bluffs Express in 2012. In 2013, the team moved to Lincoln, Nebraska and their home stadium was changed to the former Pershing Center.

Later in 2013, head coach Dave Brumagen was suspended for the season after pushing an Omaha Beef player to the ground after the player had scored a touchdown. Brumagen was replaced by Trever Whiting on July 22, 2013, as the Haymakers Head Coach. Three months later, Whiting was dismissed from the organization. On October 28, 2013, former Husker Cory Ross was officially announced by the team as the new head coach for the second season of play.

After playing in the Champions Professional Indoor Football League for two seasons, the league merged with the Lone Star Football League to create Champions Indoor Football for the 2015 season, Lincoln was left out of the league.

== History ==
The Lincoln Haymakers were founded as the Iowa Blackhawks in 2004. They were founded as members of the American Professional Football League, and opened their first season at Mid-America Center. In 2007, the Iowa Blackhawks renewed their agreement to stay at Mid-America Center. In 2008, the Iowa Blackhawks announced an extension of their broadcasting deal with CyaNet Sports. That same year, the Blackhawks announced that they would be replacing their former general manager Jake Hifferman with Jeremy Poore.

In October 2011, it was announced that the Iowa Blackhawks would be sold to different owners and would change their name to the Council Bluffs Express. The new owners also announced that the team would stay in Council Bluffs. In 2012, it was announced that the Council Bluffs express would be moving to Lincoln, Nebraska and would change their name to the Lincoln Haymakers. Their home stadium would become the former Pershing Center.

In 2013, following the dissolution of the American Professional Football League, the Lincoln Haymakers transferred to the Champions Professional Indoor Football League. That same year, their coach, Dave Brumagen, was suspended for shoving an Omaha Beef player to the ground. He was replaced by Trever Whiting in July 2013. Whiting himself was replaced by former Husker Cory Ross in October. The Lincoln Haymakers ceased operations after the 2014 season.

== Coaches of note ==
=== Head coaches ===
Name	Term	Regular season				Playoffs		Awards
Name	Term	W	L	T	Win%	W	L	Awards
Dave Brumagen	2013	3	5	0	.375	0	0	
Cory Ross	2013–2014	6	10	0	.375	0	0	

== Final roster ==
Lincoln Haymakers roster
Quarterbacks: 14 Chuck Wright; Running backs: 6 Wayne Jacobs; 20 Brian McNeill; Wide receivers: 2 Troy Brookins; 8 Marques Parker; 1 Nick Rhodes; 23 Marquis Rolle; 15 Steven Rush; 4 Shane Scott; 3 Demarius Washington	Offensive linemen: -- Joshua Davis; -- Tyrice Ellebb; 50 Richard Lilla; 50 Billy Sonnemaker; Defensive linemen: 50 Eric Banford; 16 Marcus Miles; 45 Justin Powell	Linebackers: 9 Devon Bridges; 11 Jesse Roberson; Defensive backs: 27 Jon Banks; 31 Tyler Burks; 9 Kevin Clark; 7 Michael Pace; 0 Emmanuel Souarin; Kickers: 19 Benny Hanaphy	Reserve lists: 10 Antonio Bell DB (IR); 66 Anthony Brock T (IR); 21 Antonio Ficklin DT (IR); 80 Dallas Huber WR (IR); 32 Willie Horn LB (Exempt); 67 Jimmy Jean DL (Exempt); 50 Max Jean-Gilles OL (Exempt); 90 Joseph Lara OL (IR); 70 Derrick Morris OL (IR); 22 Travis Ribbing RB (IR); 69 Javon Ross OL (IR); 1 Darron Thomas QB (Exempt); Roster updated May 22, 2014; Transactions; 24 Active, 12 Inactive

== Season schedules ==
=== 2013 ===
Week	Date	Kickoff	Opponent	Results		Citation
Week	Date	Kickoff	Opponent	Final Score	Team Record	
1	Bye					
2	March 17 (Sun)	4:30pm	@Mid-Missouri Outlaws	38-31	1-0	
3	Bye					
4	March 29 (Fri)	7:05pm	Sioux City Bandits	20-42	1-1	
5	April 5 (Fri)	7:05pm	@Bloomington Edge	40-62	1-2	
6	April 13 (Sat)	7:05pm	Omaha Beef	49-55	1-3	
7	April 19 (Fri)	7:05pm	Salina Bombers	19-31	1-4	
8	April 26 (Fri)	7:05pm	Oklahoma Defenders	46-40	2-4	
9	May 3 (Fri)	7:05pm	Bloomington Edge	48-39	3-4	
10	May 11 (Sat)	7:30pm	@Omaha Beef	23-27	3-5	
11	May 18 (Sat)	7:05pm	@Sioux City Bandits	17-24	3-6	
12	May 25 (Sat)	7:30pm	@Salina Bombers	14-46	3-7	
13	June 1 (Sat)	7:05pm	Omaha Beef	24-34	3-8	
14	June 8 (Sat)	7:30pm	@Kansas Koyotes	45-16	4-8	

== Season-by-season results ==
League champions	Conference champions	Division champions	Wild card berth	League leader

Season	Team	League	Conference	Division	Regular season				Postseason results
Season	Team	League	Conference	Division	Finish	Wins	Losses	Ties	Postseason results
2011	2011	APFL			2nd	6	5	0	Won APFL Semifinals vs. Outlaws 57-45; Lost APFL Championship vs. Bandits 28-69
2012	2012	APFL			2nd	9	3	0	Won APFL Semifinals vs. Defenders 37-32; Lost APFL Championship vs. Bandits 34-56
2013	2013	CPIFL			7th	4	8	0	Failed To Make Playoffs
2014	2014	CPIFL			5th	5	7	0	
Totals						24	25	0	All-time regular season record (2004–2014)
Totals						2	2	-	All-time postseason record (2004–2014)
Totals						26	27	0	All-time regular season and postseason record (2004–2014)
