= 2015 San Angelo Bandits season =

- Owner: Randy Sanders; Sue Sanders
- General manager: Tim White
- Head coach: Joey Longoria (games 1–5); Wendell Davis (games 6–)
- Home stadium: Foster Communications Coliseum; 50 East 43rd Street; San Angelo, Texas 76903

Results
- Record: 1-10
- League place: 8th
- Playoffs: did not qualify

The 2015 San Angelo Bandits season was the team's third season as a professional indoor football franchise, third as the "San Angelo Bandits", and first as a member of Champions Indoor Football (CIF). The Bandits were led by head coach Wendell Davis.

The Bandits were the 2014 champions of the Lone Star Football League, the last before the LSFL merged with the Champions Professional Indoor Football League and several other teams to form Champions Indoor Football. One of nine teams in the CIF for the 2015 season, the Bandits played their home games at Foster Communications Coliseum in San Angelo, Texas.

== Season summary ==
The Bandits' announced schedule for the 2015 season was affected when the New Mexico Stars abruptly postponed their entry into the league on February 21, just one week before the season began. On March 3, the Albuquerque-based Duke City Gladiators were announced as a late entry into the league, partially replacing the Stars in the CIF schedule with a plan to play 11 games in 2015. The Gladiators simply replaced the Stars on the Bandits' schedule for two home games and one road game.

Just one season after San Angelo won the LSFL championship, the Bandits found themselves in a new league and an unfamiliar position as underdogs. The team lost its first 5 games as a CIF franchise under the leadership of new head coach Joey Longoria. He was replaced as head coach by former Dallas Cowboys player and recently released Texas Revolution head coach Wendell Davis. Longoria was demoted to defensive coordinator and offensive coordinator Gabe Carillo was released. Davis led the Bandits to their first win of the season by defeating the Revolution in San Angelo but decisively lost the next weekend's matchup against the Revolution at the Allen Event Center. This was followed by a home defeat by the Duke City Gladiators, another road loss to Texas, and a home-season ending loss to Duke City. The May 30 road game against the Salina Bombers was cancelled when that team abruptly folded on May 28.

== Awards and honors ==
Each week of the regular season, the CIF names league-wide Players of the Week in offensive, defensive, and special teams categories. For Week 3, the CIF named defensive back Darrelle Charlo as the Defensive Player of the Week. For Week 8, the CIF named kick returner Darrell Harkless as one of two Special Teams Players of the Week.

== Schedule ==
Key: Win Tie Loss Bye

=== Regular season ===
Week	Day	Date	Kickoff	Opponent	Results		Location	Attendance
Week	Day	Date	Kickoff	Opponent	Score	Record	Location	Attendance
1	Saturday	March 14	7:05pm	Texas Revolution	L 36–42	0–1	Foster Communications Coliseum	2,200
2	Saturday	March 21	7:05pm	Dodge City Law	L 45–47	0–2	Foster Communications Coliseum	2,000
3	Saturday	March 28	7:05pm	Amarillo Venom	L 32–50	0–3	Foster Communications Coliseum	2,000
4	Saturday	April 4	7:05pm	at Duke City Gladiators^{1}	L 34–51	0–4	Tingley Coliseum	1,500
5	Saturday	April 11	7:05pm	at Amarillo Venom	L 40–62	0–5	Amarillo Civic Center	2,500
6	Saturday	April 18	7:05pm	Texas Revolution	W 42–38	1–5	Foster Communications Coliseum	NA
7	Friday	April 24	7:05pm	at Texas Revolution	L 31–83	1–6	Allen Event Center	3,673
8	Saturday	May 2	7:00pm	Duke City Gladiators^{1}	L 61–64	1–7	Foster Communications Coliseum	NA
9	BYE							
10	Saturday	May 16	7:05pm	at Texas Revolution	L 48–78	1–8	Allen Event Center	4,124
11	Monday	May 25	7:05pm	Duke City Gladiators^{1}	L 10–47	1–9	Foster Communications Coliseum	NA
13	Saturday	May 30	7:05pm	at Salina Bombers	CANCELLED^{2}	1–9	Bicentennial Center	
14	Saturday	June 6	7:05pm	at Amarillo Venom	L 7–65	1–10	Amarillo Civic Center	NA

^{1} Rescheduled after the New Mexico Stars withdrew from the league on February 22, 2015.
^{2} Game cancelled after Salina Bombers ejected from league on May 28, 2015.

== Roster ==
2015 San Angelo Bandits roster
Quarterbacks: 15 Brendan Crawford; 1 Justin Billiot; Running backs: 18 Brannon Hatley; Wide receivers: 5 Michael Ball; 4 Darrell Cantu-Harkless; -- Josh Collins; 5 Beau Gonzales; 11 Kurtis Green; 2 Shiloh Hickman; 6 Darrelle Raven-Charlo; 3 Jason Stephenson	Offensive linemen: 53 Alex Joyner; 99 Larry Landry; 77 Parker Rentz; 73 Aneus Ruiz; Defensive linemen: 91 Lee Hughes; -- Joe Laukaitis; 90 Kyle Paterson	Linebackers: 41 Tyler Murray; Defensive backs: 7 Chris Boudreaux; 10 Reuben Tiller; 13 Joe Webb; 20 Greg Yeldell; Kickers: 19 Jared Wood	Injured Reserve: currently vacant; Exempt List: currently vacant; rookies in italics Roster updated March 19, 2015; 24 Active, 0 Inactive → More rosters

== Standings ==
2015 Champions Indoor Football
	W	L	PCT	PF	PA
z-Sioux City Bandits	9	3	.750	697	536
y-Texas Revolution	8	4	.667	638	475
x-Wichita Force	8	4	.667	553	536
x-Amarillo Venom	7	5	.583	647	598
Dodge City Law	7	5	.583	635	578
Salina Bombers	6	5	.545	538	483
Duke City Gladiators	4	4	.500	403	389
San Angelo Bandits	1	10	.091	388	627
Omaha Beef	1	11	.083	395	672

x = clinched playoffs, y = clinched home playoffs, z = clinched top seed

== Playoffs ==
Semifinals
3	Wichita	27
2	Texas	39
4	Amarillo	52
1	Sioux City	83

Champions Bowl I
2	Texas	61
1	Sioux City	76
