= 2015 Texas Revolution season =

- Owner: Championship Sports Group
- General manager: Tim Brown
- Head coach: Wendell Davis (games 1–4); Devin Wyman (games 5–)
- Home stadium: Allen Event Center; 200 East Stacy Road; Allen, Texas 75002

Results
- Record: 8-4
- League place: 2nd
- Playoffs: Won Semi-final (Force) 39-27; Lost Champions Bowl I (SC Bandits) 61-76

The 2015 Texas Revolution season was the team's sixteenth season as a professional indoor football franchise, third as the "Texas Revolution", and first as a member of Champions Indoor Football (CIF). One of nine teams in the CIF for the 2015 season, the Revolution played their home games at the Allen Event Center in Allen, Texas.

The Revolution played under the direction of head coach Devin Wyman. The team was led by first-year coach Wendell Davis from the start of the season until he was let go after four regular season games on March 30, 2014.

== Season summary ==
The Revolution's announced schedule for the 2015 season was disrupted when the New Mexico Stars abruptly postponed their entry into the league on February 21, just one week before the season began. On March 3, the Albuquerque-based Duke City Gladiators were announced as a late entry into the league, partially replacing the Stars in the CIF schedule with a plan to play 11 games in 2015. The Gladiators' schedule has them visiting the Revolution twice, just as the Stars were supposed to, but replaces the road game originally scheduled at New Mexico with a visit to the Dodge City Law.

== Off-field moves ==
The Revolution earned a 3–11 record and missed the playoffs in 2014 under first-year head coach Chris Williams. In mid-July 2014, team president Tommy Benizio gave Williams a vote of confidence, expressing a need for "consistency" and declaring "I completely believe in him." In late August 2014, the team released Williams and hired former Dallas Cowboys cornerback Wendell Davis as head coach and director of football operations. In late September 2014, the team announced the hiring of NFL veteran Larry Centers as running backs and linebackers coach.

At the end of August 2014, the Texas Revolution announced it was leaving the Indoor Football League for the new Champions Indoor Football league. The team's 2015 schedule begins with a pre-season home game on February 27 and two regular season road games before the home opener on March 20. Team officials cited the new league's potential for both growth and stability as well as a flexible salary cap among the reasons for joining the CIF.

On February 12, 2015, the team introduced former Revolution running back Jennifer Welter as their new linebackers and special teams coach. Welter is the first woman to coach in a men's professional football league.

On March 30, 2015, the Revolution released head coach Wendell Davis and named defensive coordinator Devin Wyman as his replacement. The team cited the desire of general manager Tim Brown to "take a more active role with the coaching staff" as the reason for Davis' release. Two weeks later, Davis was named head coach of the San Angelo Bandits and his first game was a win over the Revolution.

On April 3, 2015, the team added NFL veteran Terry Glenn to the coaching staff as offensive coordinator.

== Roster moves ==
=== Off-season ===
Leading up to the 2015 season, D1 Sports Training in Dallas served as the team's new performance training facility. On October 4, 2014, the team held its first open tryout for players at D1. A second open tryout was held January 3, 2015, at the Allen Event Center in Allen, Texas.

On September 11, 2014, the team signed kicker Garrett Palmer. On September 23, the team announced that it had re-signed defensive lineman Jason Sutherland and offensive lineman DJ Brandel as well as signing defensive end Robert Williams Jr. On September 30, the Revolution signed fullback Keidrick Jackson and linebacker Rashad Washington while releasing offensive lineman Xavier Pete and defensive back C.J. Wilson. On October 1, the Revs announced that All-IFL cornerback/wide receiver Frankie Solomon Jr. had re-signed for the 2015 season.

On October 6, the team signed offensive lineman Michael Wormley plus wide receivers Derrick Herman and DeMarcus Jenkins. On October 7, the Revolution signed defensive backs Brandon Henderson Sr. and Phillip Benning, offensive lineman Kameron Young, and quarterback Robert Kent Jr. On the same day, they released offensive lineman D.J. Brandel and running back Jordan Brown RB. On October 10, the team signed wide receivers/defensive backs Jeff Willis and A-Vel McLamb. On October 17, the Revolution signed running back Darius Fudge and linebacker Deamario Dixon.

On October 27, the team signed defensive backs Emmanuel Souarin, Thailand Pierce, and Levar Hart, quarterback Luke Halpin, defensive lineman Jeremiah Fennell, and linebacker Grail Brewster. On November 4, the team signed offensive lineman Roy Richard plus wide receivers Joshua Reid and Brett Reece Jr. while releasing quarterback Damian Danning. On November 18, the Revolution signed defensive lineman Zane Brown and released defensive lineman Godwin Ubah. On December 10, the team signed offensive lineman Robert Griffin. On January 14, 2015, the team signed linebacker Roger Stewart LB while releasing defensive lineman Rodney Johnson.

=== Pre-season ===
As the final roster was being assembled prior to the team's pre-season game against the North Texas Crunch, the Revolution released linebacker Bryan Iwuji, defensive lineman E.J. Nduka, and wide receivers Derrick Herman, Garrett Tidwell, and Jahmal Coleman on February 23. On the same day, the team signed defensive end Jason Sutherland, defensive backs Brian Jackson and Anthony Webb, and running back Corey Austin RB. On February 24, the team signed defensive lineman Dustin Sherer plus wide receivers Ed Young and Will Cole Jr.

== Awards and honors ==
Each week of the regular season, the CIF named league-wide Players of the Week in offensive, defensive, and special teams categories. For Week 4, the CIF named defensive linesman DeMario Dixon as the Defensive Player of the Week. For Week 5, the CIF named kick returner Frankie Solomon Jr. as the Special Teams Player of the Week. The league cited Solomon's 8 kickoff returns for 121 yards in the loss to the Dodge City Law among the factors for the honor. For Week 6, the CIF named wide receiver Brett Reese Jr. as the Offensive Player of the Week.

For Week 8, the CIF named defensive lineman Robert Williams as the Defensive Player of the Week. For Week 9, the CIF named quarterback Robert Kent as the Offensive Player of the Week. For Week 12, the CIF named defensive lineman Taylor McCuller as the Defensive Player of the Week. For Week 13, the CIF again named quarterback Robert Kent as the Offensive Player of the Week.

On June 6, the CIF announced the winners of its year-end awards. The Texas Revolution were honored for Dance Team of the Year and Community Relations of the Year, defensive lineman DeMario Dixon was named Defensive Player of the Year, and defensive lineman Robert Williams was named Rookie of the Year.

== Schedule ==
Key: Win Tie Loss Bye

=== Pre-season ===
Week	Day	Date	Kickoff	Opponent	Results		Location	Attendance
Week	Day	Date	Kickoff	Opponent	Score	Record	Location	Attendance
1	Friday	February 27	7:00pm	North Texas Crunch (NAIFL)	W 61–19	1–0	Allen Event Center	NA

=== Regular season ===
Week	Day	Date	Kickoff	Opponent	Results		Location	Attendance
Week	Day	Date	Kickoff	Opponent	Score	Record	Location	Attendance
1	Saturday	March 7	7:00pm	at Salina Bombers	L 27–34	0–1	Bicentennial Center	2,100
2	Saturday	March 14	7:00pm	at San Angelo Bandits	W 42–36	1–1	Foster Communications Coliseum	2,200
3	Friday	March 20	7:05pm	Duke City Gladiators^{1}	W 56–16	2–1	Allen Event Center	3,403
4	Saturday	March 28	7:00pm	at Dodge City Law^{1}	L 52–55	2–2	United Wireless Arena	3,116
5	Saturday	April 4	7:05pm	Amarillo Venom	W 51–27	3–2	Allen Event Center	3,423
6	Saturday	April 11	7:05pm	Wichita Force	W 48–21	4–2	Allen Event Center	3,556
7	Saturday	April 18	7:05pm	at San Angelo Bandits	L 38–42	4–3	Foster Communications Coliseum	NA
8	Friday	April 24	7:05pm	San Angelo Bandits^{1}	W 83–31	5–3	Allen Event Center	3,673
9	Saturday	May 2	7:00pm	at Amarillo Venom	L 45–55	5–4	Amarillo Civic Center	NA
10	BYE							
11	Saturday	May 16	7:05pm	San Angelo Bandits	W 78–48	6–4	Allen Event Center	4,124
12	Saturday	May 23	7:00pm	at Amarillo Venom	W 64–61	7–4	Amarillo Civic Center	NA
13	Friday	May 29	7:05pm	Duke City Gladiators^{1}	W 54–49	8–4	Allen Event Center	4,381

^{1} Rescheduled after the New Mexico Stars withdrew from the league on February 22, 2015.

=== Postseason ===
Round	Day	Date	Kickoff	Opponent	Results		Location	Attendance
Round	Day	Date	Kickoff	Opponent	Score	Record	Location	Attendance
Semi-final	Thursday	June 11	7:00pm	Wichita Force	W 39–27	1–0	Allen Event Center	2,144
Champions Bowl I	Saturday	June 20	7:05pm	at Sioux City Bandits	L 61–76	1–1	Tyson Events Center	3,757

== Roster ==
2015 Texas Revolution roster
Quarterbacks: 4 Luke Halpin; 12 Robert Kent; Running backs: 22 Jordan Brown; 2 Darius Fudge; Wide receivers: 10 Brandon Carter; 3 Ronald Gaudin; 13 LaJuente Hicks; 18 Jason Stephenson	Offensive linemen: 56 Richard Roy; 72 Michael Wormely; 53 Kameron Young; Defensive linemen: 9 Jeff Clermond; 5 DeMario Dixon; 44 Malik Thompson; 7 Robert Williams	Linebackers: 32 Taylor McCuller; -- Giorgio Walton; Defensive backs: 1 Cody Berry; 4 Bryan Carroll; -- Chris Crayton; 11 Lendy Holmes; 15 Frankie Solomon, Jr.; -- Jamaal White; 21 Jeff Willis; Kickers: 14 Manual Cruz	Injured reserve: 6 Brett Reece WR; -- Joshua Reid WR; 85 Jason Sutherland DL; 9 Rashad Washington LB; Exempt list: 11 Johnathan Haggerty WR; 1 Clinton Solomon WR; Practice squad: 6 Kewan Dewberry QB; Rookies in italics Roster updated June 18, 2015; 25 Active, 7 Inactive

== Standings ==
2015 Champions Indoor Football
	W	L	PCT	PF	PA
z-Sioux City Bandits	9	3	.750	697	536
y-Texas Revolution	8	4	.667	638	475
x-Wichita Force	8	4	.667	553	536
x-Amarillo Venom	7	5	.583	647	598
Dodge City Law	7	5	.583	635	578
Salina Bombers	6	5	.545	538	483
Duke City Gladiators	4	4	.500	403	389
San Angelo Bandits	1	10	.091	388	627
Omaha Beef	1	11	.083	395	672

x = clinched playoffs, y = clinched home playoffs, z = clinched top seed

== Playoffs ==
Semifinals
3	Wichita	27
2	Texas	39
4	Amarillo	52
1	Sioux City	83

Champions Bowl I
2	Texas	61
1	Sioux City	76
