= 2015 Salina Bombers season =

- Owner: Chris Vercher
- General manager: Pete Jackson
- Head coach: Bob Ray
- Home stadium: Bicentennial Center; 800 The Midway; Salina, Kansas 67401

Results
- Record: 6-5
- League place: 6th
- Playoffs: did not qualify

The 2015 Salina Bombers season was the team's third and final season as a professional indoor football franchise and first as a member of Champions Indoor Football (CIF). One of nine teams in the CIF for the inaugural 2015 season, the Salina Bombers were owned by Chris Vercher. The Force played their home games at the Bicentennial Center in Salina, Kansas, under the direction of head coach Bob Ray. The season ended abruptly on May 28, 2015, after the CIF ejected the team from the league and the team subsequently folded entirely.

== Season summary ==
The Bombers' announced schedule for the 2015 season was altered after the New Mexico Stars abruptly postponed their entry into the league on February 21, just one week before the season began. On March 3, the Albuquerque-based Duke City Gladiators were announced as a late entry into the league, partially replacing the Stars in the CIF schedule with a plan to play 11 games in 2015.

Salina started 2015 with a preseason win over cross-state rivals Kansas Koyotes and three straight regular season victories over CIF opponents. A mid-March loss to league-leading Sioux City Bandits was followed by a victory over the cellar-dwelling Omaha Beef. The Bombers then lost 3 straight, won 2 in a row, and lost in overtime on the road at the Wichita Force. This loss dropped them to 6–5 and put their playoff chances in doubt leading into their bye week.

The Bombers league membership was suspended by the CIF on May 28, with safety and financial concerns cited for the suspension. Later that same day, the team announced that it was ceasing operations immediately and would issue refunds to ticket holders. The Salina Journal reported that a lack of workers' compensation insurance for the players led the coach to suspend practices and the CIF to suspend the franchise.

== Off-field moves ==
After the 2014 season ended, the Champions Professional Indoor Football League announced it was merging with teams from other leagues to form a new league, Champions Indoor Football. The Bombers are one of four CPIFL teams to join the CIF, alongside the Dodge City Law, Omaha Beef, and Sioux City Bandits.

== Awards and honors ==
Each week of the regular season, the CIF named league-wide Players of the Week in offensive, defensive, and special teams categories. For Week 1, the CIF named defensive back Isiah Barfield as the Defensive Player of the Week. For Week 3, the CIF named quarterback Chris Coffin as the Offensive Player of the Week and kick returner OJ Simpson as the Special Teams Player of the Week. For Week 4, the CIF named kicker Thomas Frevert as the Special Teams Player of the Week. For Week 6, the CIF named defensive linesman Clarence Bumpass as the Defensive Player of the Week. For Week 10, the CIF again named quarterback Chris Coffin as the Offensive Player of the Week. For Week 11, the CIF once again named quarterback Chris Coffin as the Offensive Player of the Week and defensive back Isiah Barfield as the Defensive Player of the Week.

On June 6, Bombers quarterback Chris Coffin was honored as the CIF's Offensive Player of the Year.

== Schedule ==
Key: Win Tie Loss Bye

=== Pre-season ===
Week	Day	Date	Kickoff	Opponent	Results		Location
Week	Day	Date	Kickoff	Opponent	Score	Record	Location
1	Sunday	February 22	3:00pm	Kansas Koyotes	W 62–23	1–0	Bicentennial Center

=== Regular season ===
Week	Day	Date	Kickoff	Opponent	Results		Location	Attendance
Week	Day	Date	Kickoff	Opponent	Score	Record	Location	Attendance
1	Saturday	February 28	7:05pm	at Wichita Force	W 64–61	1–0	Intrust Bank Arena	3,900
2	Saturday	March 7	7:05pm	Texas Revolution	W 34–27	2–0	Bicentennial Center	2,100
3	Saturday	March 14	7:05pm	at Omaha Beef	W 47–33	3–0	Ralston Arena	3,717
4	Saturday	March 21	7:05pm	at Sioux City Bandits	L 59–73	3–1	Tyson Events Center	3,303
5	Saturday	March 28	7:05pm	Omaha Beef	W 49–7	4–1	Bicentennial Center	
6	Saturday	April 4	7:05pm	Dodge City Law	L 43–47	4–2	Bicentennial Center	3,675
7	BYE							
8	Saturday	April 18	7:05pm	at Sioux City Bandits	L 56–79	4–3	Tyson Events Center	3,665
9	Saturday	April 25	7:05pm	Wichita Force	L 32–45	4–4	Bicentennial Center	
10	Saturday	May 2	7:05pm	at Dodge City Law	W 55–48	5–4	United Wireless Arena	2,893
11	Saturday	May 9	7:05pm	Omaha Beef	W 59–13	6–4	Bicentennial Center	
12	Saturday	May 16	7:05pm	at Wichita Force	L 40–46 (OT)	6–5	Intrust Bank Arena	2,117
13	BYE							
14	Saturday	May 30	7:05pm	San Angelo Bandits	CANCELLED^{2}	–	Bicentennial Center	
15	Saturday	June 6	7:05pm	at Duke City Gladiators	CANCELLED^{2}	–	Santa Ana Star Center^{1}	

^{1} Duke City alternate home site as Tingley Coliseum was unavailable in June
^{2} Game cancelled after Salina Bombers ejected from league on May 28, 2015.

== Roster ==
2015 Salina Bombers roster
Quarterbacks: 2 Kyle Cool; Running backs: 33 Quentin Benning; 3 Jeff Mack; Wide receivers: 12 Jared Elmore; 7 Anthony Parks; - Julius Record; 20 O. J. Simpson; 5 Attrail Snipes	Offensive linemen: 90 Marcus Bolden; 56 Rodney Ewing; 55 Edward Prince; -- Jeremy Walker; Defensive linemen: 45 Adam Davis; 11 Brandon Harold; 88 Brandon McKinney	Linebackers: 6 Clarence Bumpas; 7 Tyus Jackson; 4 Justiss Scales; Defensive backs: 19 Isiah Barfield; -- Delaney Dobard; -- DaMonte Horton; Kickers: 81 Terry Stecker	Injured Reserve: 13 Ira Autrey DB; Transfer List: 11 Tommy Frevert K; Refuse to Report: currently vacant; rookies in italics; updated March 5, 2015; 20 Active, 0 Inactive

== Standings ==
2015 Champions Indoor Football
	W	L	PCT	PF	PA
z-Sioux City Bandits	9	3	.750	697	536
y-Texas Revolution	8	4	.667	638	475
x-Wichita Force	8	4	.667	553	536
x-Amarillo Venom	7	5	.583	647	598
Dodge City Law	7	5	.583	635	578
Salina Bombers	6	5	.545	538	483
Duke City Gladiators	4	4	.500	403	389
San Angelo Bandits	1	10	.091	388	627
Omaha Beef	1	11	.083	395	672

x = clinched playoffs, y = clinched home playoffs, z = clinched top seed

== Playoffs ==
Semifinals
3	Wichita	27
2	Texas	39
4	Amarillo	52
1	Sioux City	83

Champions Bowl I
2	Texas	61
1	Sioux City	76
