= 2015 Dodge City Law season =

- Owner: Ricky Bertz
- General manager: Ricky Bertz
- Head coach: Sean Ponder
- Home stadium: United Wireless Arena; 4100 W Comanche St. Dodge City, Kansas 67801

Results
- Record: 7-5
- League place: 5th
- Playoffs: did not qualify

The 2015 Dodge City Law season is the team's second season as a professional indoor football franchise and first as a member of Champions Indoor Football (CIF) in the 2015 season.

The team is owned and operated by Ricky Bertz. The Law play their home games at the United Wireless Arena in Dodge City, Kansas, under the direction of head coach Sean Ponder.

== Season summary ==
The Law's announced schedule for the 2015 season was disrupted when the New Mexico Stars abruptly postponed their entry into the league on February 21, just one week before the season began. On March 3, the Albuquerque-based Duke City Gladiators were announced as a late entry into the league, partially replacing the Stars in the CIF schedule with a plan to play 11 games in 2015. The team's March 14 game was delayed one day to accommodate a high school basketball tournament that relocated to Dodge City.

== Off-field moves ==
The Law earned an 8–4 record in 2014 as an expansion team in the Champions Professional Indoor Football League. They lost to the Wichita Wild in the league championship semi-finals. After the season ended, the CPIFL announced it was merging with teams from other leagues to form Champions Indoor Football.

== Awards and honors ==
Each week of the regular season, the CIF names league-wide Players of the Week in offensive, defensive, and special teams categories. For Week 5, the CIF named quarterback Joshua Floyd as the Offensive Player of the Week and defensive linesman Marquis George as the Defensive Player of the Week. For Week 8, the CIF named kick returner Dominique Carson as one of two Special Teams Players of the Week.

On June 6, the CIF announced the winners of its year-end awards. The Dodge City Law were named Franchise of the Year, honored for Game Operations of the Year, saw owner/general manager Ricky Bertz named Executive of the Year, and had kick returner Dominique Carson share the Special Teams Players of the Year honors.

== Schedule ==
Key: Win Tie Loss Bye

=== Pre-season ===
Week	Day	Date	Kickoff	Opponent	Results		Location	Attendance
Week	Day	Date	Kickoff	Opponent	Score	Record	Location	Attendance
1	Sunday	February 22	5:00pm	4-State Fusion	W 55–0	1–0	United Wireless Arena	NA

=== Regular season ===
Week	Day	Date	Kickoff	Opponent	Results		Location	Attendance
Week	Day	Date	Kickoff	Opponent	Score	Record	Location	Attendance
1	Saturday	March 7	7:00pm	Amarillo Venom	L 63–68	0–1	United Wireless Arena	2,803
2	Sunday	March 15	7:00pm	Sioux City Bandits^{2}	W 51–39	1–1	United Wireless Arena	2,411
3	Saturday	March 21	7:00pm	at San Angelo Bandits	W 47–45	2–1	Foster Communications Coliseum	2,000
4	Saturday	March 28	7:00pm	Texas Revolution	W 55–52	3–1	United Wireless Arena	3,116
5	Saturday	April 4	7:05pm	at Salina Bombers	W 47–43	4–1	Bicentennial Center	3,675
6	Saturday	April 11	7:00pm	at Duke City Gladiators^{1}	W 47–43	5–1	Tingley Coliseum	1,004
7	Saturday	April 18	7:00pm	Omaha Beef	W 69–45	6–1	United Wireless Arena	2,779
8	Saturday	April 25	6:00pm	at Amarillo Venom^{1}	L 43–44	6–2	Amarillo Civic Center	NA
9	Saturday	May 2	7:00pm	Salina Bombers	L 48–55	6–3	United Wireless Arena	2,893
10	Friday	May 8	7:00pm	at Wichita Force	L 49–52	6–4	Intrust Bank Arena	3,576
11	BYE							
12	Friday	May 22	7:00pm	at Omaha Beef	W 64–39	7–4	Ralston Arena	NA
13	BYE							
14	Saturday	June 6	7:00pm	Sioux City Bandits	L 52–53	7–5	United Wireless Arena	2,656

^{1} Rescheduled after the New Mexico Stars withdrew from the league on February 22, 2015.
^{2} Rescheduled to accommodate a high school basketball tournament

== Roster ==
2015 Dodge City Law roster
Quarterbacks: 11 Joshua Floyd; Running backs: 21 Dominique Carson; 2 KingJack Washington; Wide receivers: 5 Jeffrey Camerson; 10 Dello Davis; 14 Lance Jackson; 1 Jamie January; 7 Zach McClain; 9 Brandon Venson; -- Maurice Young	Offensive linemen: 50 Kyle McManus; 71 Mack Randall; 55 Odie Rush; 54 Jamar Seard; Defensive linemen: 1 Michael Billingsley; 94 Louvan Green; 90 Maquis George; 54 Jamar Seard	Linebackers: 16 Rico Brooks; 8 Jercorey Quarterman; Defensive backs: 17 DeWayne Autrey; 7 Quinton Collins; 6 DeJohn Love; 3 Cordney Sanders; -- Justin Spurill; 22 Mark Sterling; 4 Cashmin Thomas; Kickers: 98 Alex Fambrough	Injured Reserve: currently vacant; Transfer List: currently vacant; Refuse to Report: currently vacant; rookies in italics Roster updated March 31, 2015; 26 Active, 0 Inactive → More rosters

== Standings ==
2015 Champions Indoor Football
	W	L	PCT	PF	PA
z-Sioux City Bandits	9	3	.750	697	536
y-Texas Revolution	8	4	.667	638	475
x-Wichita Force	8	4	.667	553	536
x-Amarillo Venom	7	5	.583	647	598
Dodge City Law	7	5	.583	635	578
Salina Bombers	6	5	.545	538	483
Duke City Gladiators	4	4	.500	403	389
San Angelo Bandits	1	10	.091	388	627
Omaha Beef	1	11	.083	395	672

x = clinched playoffs, y = clinched home playoffs, z = clinched top seed

== Playoffs ==
Semifinals
3	Wichita	27
2	Texas	39
4	Amarillo	52
1	Sioux City	83

Champions Bowl I
2	Texas	61
1	Sioux City	76
