= 2015 Amarillo Venom season =

- Owner: Stephanie Tucker
- General manager: Stephanie Tucker
- Head coach: Julian Reese
- Home stadium: Amarillo Civic Center

Results
- Record: 7-5
- League place: 4th
- Playoffs: Lost semi-finals (SC Bandits) 52-83

The 2015 Amarillo Venom season was the team's twelfth season as a professional indoor football franchise, sixth as the "Amarillo Venom", and first as a member of Champions Indoor Football (CIF). The Venom were led by head coach Julian Reese. The defensive coordinator was Daniel Snyder, receivers coach was John King, assistant coach was Barrett Allen, wide receivers coach was Craig Fulton, special teams coach was Donna Welch, and the trainer was Nathan Johnson.

The Venom were the 2013 champions of the Lone Star Football League, just one season before it merged with the Champions Professional Indoor Football League and several other teams to form Champions Indoor Football. The Venom were one of nine teams in the CIF for the 2015 season. The Venom played their home games at the Amarillo Civic Center in Amarillo, Texas.

== Season summary ==
The Venom's announced schedule for the 2015 season was disrupted when the New Mexico Stars abruptly postponed their entry into the league on February 21, just one week before the season began. On March 3, the Albuquerque-based Duke City Gladiators were announced as a late entry into the league, partially replacing the Stars in the CIF schedule with a plan to play 11 games in 2015. The Gladiators' schedule has them visiting the Venom once in April and hosting the Venom once in May, just as the Stars were supposed to, but replaces the originally scheduled March 14 road game against New Mexico with a home game against the Dodge City Law.

The Venom hosted a number of themed nights and special events at and before home games during the season. Education Night on April 25 offered family packs of 4 tickets for $20 plus a free youth-sized replica Venom jersey for the first 500 children. On May 2, the tea, held both a "Head to Toe Expo" offering makeup and fashion tips and a "Mother/Daughter Football Clinic" where coaches answered questions, offered insights, and had participants run plays on the field to better understand the game.

== Awards and honors ==
Each week of the regular season, the CIF names league-wide Players of the Week in offensive, defensive, and special teams categories. For Week 2, the CIF named quarterback Nate Davis as the Offensive Player of the Week. For Week 7, the CIF named defensive linesman Silvio Diaz as the Defensive Player of the Week and kicker Jacob Felton as the Special Teams Player of the Week. For Week 10, the CIF named linebacker Blake Adams as the Defensive Player of the Week and kicker Jacob Felton as the Special Teams Player of the Week.

== Schedule ==
Key: Win Tie Loss Bye

=== Regular season ===
Week	Day	Date	Kickoff	Opponent	Results		Location	Attendance
Week	Day	Date	Kickoff	Opponent	Score	Record	Location	Attendance
1	Saturday	March 7	7:05pm	at Dodge City Law	W 68–63	1–0	United Wireless Arena	2,803
2	BYE							
3	Saturday	March 21	7:05pm	Wichita Force	L 30–43	1–1	Amarillo Civic Center	3,200
4	Saturday	March 28	7:05pm	at San Angelo Bandits	W 50–32	2–1	Foster Communications Coliseum	2,000
5	Saturday	April 4	7:05pm	at Texas Revolution	L 27–51	2–2	Allen Event Center	3,423
6	Saturday	April 11	7:05pm	San Angelo Bandits	W 62–40	3–2	Amarillo Civic Center	2,500
7	Saturday	April 18	6:05pm	at Duke City Gladiators^{1}	L 38–45	3–3	Tingley Coliseum	1,014
8	Saturday	April 25	7:05pm	Dodge City Law^{1}	W 44–43	4–3	Amarillo Civic Center	
9	Saturday	May 2	7:00pm	Texas Revolution	W 55–45	5–3	Amarillo Civic Center	
10	BYE							
11	Saturday	May 16	7:05pm	Duke City Gladiators^{1}	W 89–86 (4OT)	6–3	Amarillo Civic Center	
12	Saturday	May 23	7:05pm	Texas Revolution	L 61–64	6–4	Amarillo Civic Center	
13	Saturday	May 30	7:05pm	at Sioux City Bandits	L 58–79	6–5	Tyson Events Center	3,708
14	Saturday	June 6	7:05pm	San Angelo Bandits	W 65–7	7–5	Amarillo Civic Center	

^{1} Rescheduled after the New Mexico Stars withdrew from the league on February 22, 2015.

=== Post-season ===
Round	Day	Date	Kickoff	Opponent	Results		Location
Round	Day	Date	Kickoff	Opponent	Score	Record	Location
Semi-final	Saturday	June 13	7:05pm	at Sioux City Bandits	L 52–83	0–1	Tyson Events Center

== Roster ==
2015 Amarillo Venom roster
Quarterbacks: 8 Nate Davis; Running backs: 22 Tedder Easton; Wide receivers: 6 Ringo Brock; 1 Raymond Johnson; 11 Greg Jones; 12 Houston Tuminello; 10 Percy Turner	Offensive linemen: 73 Dominique Allen; 77 Gerald Blockman; 55 Michael Coles; 33 Sean Warren; Defensive linemen: 29 Wyreaz Bradley; -- Silvia Diaz; 34 Undra Hendrix; 40 Willie Townsend	Linebackers: 7 Kendrick Causey; Defensive backs: 3 Raymond Berry; 15 Will Bryant; 5 Royel Johnson; 9 Mike Maldonado; 31 Josh Murray; 24 Thailand Pierce; 4 LeRoy Trahan; Kickers: 23 Jose Chavez; 18 Jacob Felton	Injured Reserve: currently vacant; Exempt List: currently vacant; rookies in italics Roster updated March 31, 2015; 25 Active, 0 Inactive

== Standings ==
2015 Champions Indoor Football
	W	L	PCT	PF	PA
z-Sioux City Bandits	9	3	.750	697	536
y-Texas Revolution	8	4	.667	638	475
x-Wichita Force	8	4	.667	553	536
x-Amarillo Venom	7	5	.583	647	598
Dodge City Law	7	5	.583	635	578
Salina Bombers	6	5	.545	538	483
Duke City Gladiators	4	4	.500	403	389
San Angelo Bandits	1	10	.091	388	627
Omaha Beef	1	11	.083	395	672

x = clinched playoffs, y = clinched home playoffs, z = clinched top seed

== Playoffs ==
Semifinals
3	Wichita	27
2	Texas	39
4	Amarillo	52
1	Sioux City	83

Champions Bowl I
2	Texas	61
1	Sioux City	76
