= 2015 Duke City Gladiators season =

- Owner: Duke City Gladiators, Inc.
- General manager: Matt Caward
- Head coach: Dominic Bramante
- Home stadium: Tingley Coliseum; 300 San Pedro Drive NE; Albuquerque, New Mexico 87108

Results
- Record: 4–4
- League place: 7th
- Playoffs: did not qualify

The 2015 Duke City Gladiators season was the team's first season as a professional indoor football franchise, first as the "Duke City Gladiators", and first as a member of Champions Indoor Football (CIF). The Venom were led by head coach Dominic Bramante. One of nine teams in the CIF for the 2015 season, the Gladiators played their home games at Tingley Coliseum in Albuquerque, New Mexico.

== Season summary ==
The CIF's announced schedule for the 2015 season was disrupted when the New Mexico Stars abruptly postponed their entry into the league on February 21, just one week before the season began. On March 3, the Albuquerque-based Duke City Gladiators were announced as a late entry into the league, partially replacing the Stars in the CIF schedule with a plan to play 11 games in 2015. The Gladiators' schedule was a mix of league games and non-league games because of prior scheduling maneuvers and arena availability.

Although hastily assembled, the Gladiators were able to pick up many key personnel from the unexpected temporary shutdown of the New Mexico Stars. This experience allowed them to amass a 5–4 record during their unexpectedly shortened debut season. Originally scheduled for just 9 league games, the Gladiators' final home game was won by forfeit after the Sailna Bombers were ejected from the CIF on May 28. Of their four losses, only the season opener against the Texas Revolution was a blowout. The other three losses were by just 4 points, 3 points, and 5 points, respectively. Duke City also played a pair of non-league exhibition games, winning both.

== Off-field moves ==
The team opened training camp on March 15. Their first indoor practice session was March 24. Regular season promotions included Hispanic Heritage Night on March 28 and Public Service Day on April 26.

The team averaged about 1,000 fans per home game with a peak of 1,200 during the home season finale on April 26.

== Awards and honors ==
Each week of the regular season, the CIF names league-wide Players of the Week in offensive, defensive, and special teams categories. For Week 12, the CIF named quarterback Kasey Peters as the Offensive Player of the Week. For Week 13, the CIF named defensive back Jayson Serda as the Defensive Player of the Week.

== Schedule ==
Key: Win Tie Loss Bye

=== Regular season ===
Week	Day	Date	Kickoff	Opponent	Results		Location	Attendance
Week	Day	Date	Kickoff	Opponent	Score	Record	Location	Attendance
1	Friday	March 20	7:00pm	at Texas Revolution	L 16–56	0–1	Allen Event Center	3,403
2	Saturday	March 28	6:05pm	All Friends Team/Mexico^{1}^{,}^{2}	W 27–13	—	Tingley Coliseum	800 estimated
3	Saturday	April 4	6:05pm	San Angelo Bandits	W 51–34	1–1	Tingley Coliseum	1,500
4	Saturday	April 11	6:05pm	Dodge City Law	L 43–47	1–2	Tingley Coliseum	1,004
5	Saturday	April 18	6:05pm	Amarillo Venom	W 45–38	2–2	Tingley Coliseum	1,014
6	Sunday	April 26	4:05pm	Texas Stealth (NAIFL)^{1}	W 76–12	—	Tingley Coliseum	1,194
7	Saturday	May 2	7:05pm	at San Angelo Bandits	W 64–61	3–2	Foster Communications Coliseum	NA
8	BYE							
9	Saturday	May 16	7:05pm	at Amarillo Venom	L 86–89 (4OT)	3–3	Amarillo Civic Center	NA
10	Monday	May 25	7:00pm	at San Angelo Bandits	W 47–10	4–3	Foster Communications Coliseum	NA
11	Friday	May 29	7:00pm	at Texas Revolution	L 49–54	4–4	Allen Event Center	4,381
12	Saturday	June 6	6:05pm	Salina Bombers	FORFEIT^{4}	5–4	Santa Ana Star Center^{3}	

^{1} Exhibition game against non-league opponent.
^{2} Won by forfeit; game ended by officials after fight just before halftime.
^{3} Duke City alternate home site as Tingley Coliseum was unavailable in June
^{4} Game cancelled after Salina Bombers ejected from league on May 28, 2015.

== Roster ==
2015 Duke City Gladiators roster
Quarterbacks: 7 Kasey Peters; Running backs: 4 Landrick Brody; 15 Seth Smith; Wide receivers: 8 Roland Bruno; 21 James Cleveland; -- Terrance Compton; 10 Dexter Manley; 1 Emmanuel McPhearson	Offensive linemen: 95 Gerald Blockmon; -- Lamar Bratton; 77 Calvin McDowney; 52 Charles Stevens; Defensive linemen: 90 Aaron Davis; 12 John Fernandez; 42 Braxton Magalogo; 95 Randy Salmon; 35 John Sloan	Linebackers: 3 Chris Hernandez; 33 Malcolm Proctor; Defensive backs: 9 Monterius Lovett; 5 Jesse Paulsen; 28 Jayson Serda; 2 DeAndre Wright; Kickers: 11 Ezequiel Arevalo	Injured reserve: Currently vacant; Transfer list: Currently vacant; Refuse to report: Currently vacant; Roster updated April 1, 2015; 24 Active, 0 Inactive

== Standings ==
2015 Champions Indoor Football
	W	L	PCT	PF	PA
z-Sioux City Bandits	9	3	.750	697	536
y-Texas Revolution	8	4	.667	638	475
x-Wichita Force	8	4	.667	553	536
x-Amarillo Venom	7	5	.583	647	598
Dodge City Law	7	5	.583	635	578
Salina Bombers	6	5	.545	538	483
Duke City Gladiators	4	4	.500	403	389
San Angelo Bandits	1	10	.091	388	627
Omaha Beef	1	11	.083	395	672

x = clinched playoffs, y = clinched home playoffs, z = clinched top seed

== Playoffs ==
Semifinals
3	Wichita	27
2	Texas	39
4	Amarillo	52
1	Sioux City	83

Champions Bowl I
2	Texas	61
1	Sioux City	76
