= 2015 Sioux City Bandits season =

- Owner: Bob Scott
- General manager: Bob Scott
- Head coach: Erv Strohbeen
- Home stadium: Tyson Events Center; 401 Gordon Drive; Sioux City, Iowa 51101

Results
- Record: 9-3
- League place: 1st
- Playoffs: Won Semi-final (Venom) 83-52; Won Champions Bowl I (Revolution) 76-61

The 2015 Sioux City Bandits season was the team's sixteenth overall, fifteenth as the Sioux City Bandits and first as a member of Champions Indoor Football (CIF). One of nine teams in the CIF for the inaugural 2015 season, the Bandits finished the regular season with a 9–3 record to earn the number one seed in the playoffs, in which they defeated the Amarillo Venom, 83–52 in the semifinals and beat the Texas Revolution in Champions Bowl I, 76–61.

The Bandits play their home games at the Tyson Events Center in Sioux City, Iowa, under the direction of head coach Erv Strohbeen. The team's offensive coordinator is Jarrod DeGeorgia, the defensive coordinator is John Zevenbergen, and the assistant coaches include Greg Stallman, Justin Hayes, and Spetlar Tonga.

== Season summary ==
The Bandits' announced schedule for the 2015 season was not affected after the New Mexico Stars abruptly postponed their entry into the league on February 21, just one week before the season began. On March 3, the Albuquerque-based Duke City Gladiators were announced as a late entry into the league, partially replacing the Stars in the CIF schedule with a plan to play 11 games in 2015.

== Off-field moves ==
After the 2014 season ended, the Champions Professional Indoor Football League announced it was merging with teams from other leagues to form a new league, Champions Indoor Football. The Bandits are one of four CPIFL teams to join the CIF, alongside the Dodge City Law, Omaha Beef, and Salina Bombers. 8 of the Bandits' 12 regular season games in 2015 will be played against these former CPIFL teams.

Anticipating crowds for their 2015 season opener, the Bandits offered a free shuttle bus service from downtown Sioux City to their home arena, the Tyson Events Center.

== Roster moves ==
After six seasons leading the Bandits, quarterback Scott Jensen announced his retirement in December 2014. The Bandits signed Charles Dowdell away from the Bloomington Edge to lead the team in 2015. Dowdell was the CPIFL's 2014 Offensive Player of the Year and was named to the CPIFL All-Star First Team in 2014. The Bandits also signed wide receiver Frederick Bruno, the CPIFL's 2014 Special Teams Player of the Year, plus defensive end Marcus Miles and defensive back Andre Jones both formerly of the Lincoln Haymakers.

To fill out the 21-man 2015 roster, the Bandits held open tryouts in November 2014 and January 2015. The team's training camp opened in February 2015, leading up to a lone exhibition game against the Sioux Falls Storm on February 22 and the season opener at home versus the Omaha Beef on February 28.

== Awards and honors ==
Each week of the regular season, the CIF names league-wide Players of the Week in offensive, defensive, and special teams categories. For Week 1, the CIF named quarterback Charles Dowdell as the Offensive Player of the Week and kicker Max Martin as one of two Special Teams Players of the Week. For Week 4, the CIF again named quarterback Charles Dowdell as the Offensive Player of the Week. For Week 8, the CIF named quarterback Charles Dowdell as the Offensive Player of the Week for a third time. For Week 9, the CIF named defensive lineman Sean Kelly as the Defensive Player of the Week. For Week 12, the CIF named kick returner Fredrick Bruno as the Special Teams Player of the Week. For Week 14, the CIF named defensive back Rahn Franklin as the Defensive Player of the Week and again named kick returner Fredrick Bruno as the Special Teams Player of the Week.

On June 6, the CIF announced the winners of its year-end awards. The Sioux City Bandits were honored for Fan Base of the Year and Media Relations of the Year, head coach Erv Strohbeen was named Coach of the Year, quarterback Charles Dowdell was chosen as the league's Most Valuable Player, and kick returner Frederick Bruno shared the Special Teams Players of the Year honors.

== Schedule ==
Key: Win Loss Bye

=== Pre-season ===
Week	Day	Date	Kickoff	Opponent	Results		Location	Attendance
Week	Day	Date	Kickoff	Opponent	Score	Record	Location	Attendance
1	Sunday	February 22	2:05pm	at Sioux Falls Storm	L 58–64	0–0	Denny Sanford Premier Center	N/A

=== Regular season ===
Week	Day	Date	Kickoff	Opponent	Results		Location	Attendance
Week	Day	Date	Kickoff	Opponent	Score	Record	Location	Attendance
1	Saturday	February 28	7:05pm	Omaha Beef	W 62–13	1–0	Tyson Events Center	3,848
2	BYE							
3	Sunday	March 15	7:05pm	at Dodge City Law^{2}	L 39–51	1–1	United Wireless Arena	2,411
4	Saturday	March 21	7:05pm	Salina Bombers	W 73–59	2–1	Tyson Events Center	3,303
5	Saturday	March 28	7:05pm	at Wichita Force	L 35–42	2–2	Intrust Bank Arena	3,271
6	BYE							
7	Friday	April 10	7:05pm	at Omaha Beef	L 41–43	2–3	Ralston Arena	3,178
8	Saturday	April 18	7:05pm	Salina Bombers	W 79–56	3–3	Tyson Events Center	3,665
9	Friday	April 24	7:05pm	at Omaha Beef	W 61–37	4–3	Ralston Arena	3,148
10	Saturday	May 2	7:05pm	Wichita Force	W 56–42	5–3	Tyson Events Center	2,854
11	BYE							
12	Saturday	May 16	7:05pm	Omaha Beef	W 64–38	6–3	Tyson Events Center	3,021
13	Saturday	May 23	7:05pm	at Wichita Force	W 55–45	7–3	Intrust Bank Arena	3,951
14	Saturday	May 30	7:05pm	Amarillo Venom	W 79–58	8–3	Tyson Events Center	3,708
15	Saturday	June 6	7:05pm	at Dodge City Law	W 53–52	9–3	United Wireless Arena	2,656

^{2} Rescheduled to accommodate a high school basketball tournament

=== Post-season ===
Round	Day	Date	Kickoff	Opponent	Results		Location	Attendance
Round	Day	Date	Kickoff	Opponent	Score	Record	Location	Attendance
Semi-finals	Saturday	June 13	7:05pm	Amarillo Venom	W 83–52	10-3	Tyson Events Center	2,192
Champions Bowl I	Saturday	June 20	7:05pm	Texas Revolution	W 76–61	11-3	Tyson Events Center	3,757

== Roster ==
2015 Sioux City Bandits roster
Quarterbacks: 11 Charles Dowdell; Running backs: 24 Johnny Bentley; 20 Drew Prohaska; Wide receivers: 2 Fredrick Bruno; 10 Damon Mothershead; 8 Jerimiah Oates; 80 Brett Van Muyden	Offensive linemen: 78 Darius Barnes; 55 Matt Rahn; 70 Brent Schlote; Defensive linemen: 75 Darius Davis; 94 Marcus Miles; 96 Ben Pister	Linebackers: 6 Marlon Lobban; Defensive backs: 9 Denzel Adams; 18 Richard Daniel; 3 Rahn Franklin; 12 Andre Jones; 15 Josh Procher; 1 Angelo Pree; 23 Jonathan Smith; 5 Cliff Stokes; Kickers: 14 Max Martin	Injured Reserve: currently vacant; Transfer List: currently vacant; Refuse to Report: -- J'Ron Erby DB; -- Abram Walker OL/DL; Roster updated March 31, 2015; 24 Active, 2 Inactive → More rosters

== Standings ==
2015 Champions Indoor Football
	W	L	PCT	PF	PA
z-Sioux City Bandits	9	3	.750	697	536
y-Texas Revolution	8	4	.667	638	475
x-Wichita Force	8	4	.667	553	536
x-Amarillo Venom	7	5	.583	647	598
Dodge City Law	7	5	.583	635	578
Salina Bombers	6	5	.545	538	483
Duke City Gladiators	4	4	.500	403	389
San Angelo Bandits	1	10	.091	388	627
Omaha Beef	1	11	.083	395	672

x = clinched playoffs, y = clinched home playoffs, z = clinched top seed

== Playoffs ==
Semifinals
3	Wichita	27
2	Texas	39
4	Amarillo	52
1	Sioux City	83

Champions Bowl I
2	Texas	61
1	Sioux City	76
