= 2015 Omaha Beef season =

- Owner: Rich Tokheim; Jim Tokheim
- Head coach: Cory Ross
- Home stadium: Ralston Arena; 7300 Q Street; Ralston, Nebraska 68127

Results
- Record: 1-11
- League place: 9th
- Playoffs: did not qualify

The 2015 Omaha Beef season was the team's sixteenth season as a professional indoor football franchise and first as a member of Champions Indoor Football (CIF). One of nine teams in the CIF for the inaugural 2015 season, the Omaha Beef was owned and operated by Rich Tokheim and Jim Tokheim. The Beef played their home games at the Ralston Arena in Ralston, Nebraska, under the direction of head coach Cory Ross.

== Season summary ==
After a pre-season win over the Metro Militia of the Central Plains Football League, the Beef struggled to find their footing in the CIF. Omaha dropped 5 straight games before a close win at home over the Sioux City Bandits. That would prove the Beef's only win this season as they lost the remaining 6 games on the schedule. Finishing ninth in a nine-team league, Omaha did not qualify for post-season play.

== Off-field moves ==
After the 2014 season ended, the CPIFL announced it was merging with teams from other leagues to form Champions Indoor Football.

In early January 2015, the Beef named former Nebraska Cornhusker and NFL veteran Cory Ross as the team's new head coach. At the same time, they announced Josh Bullocks, Keyuo Craver, and Demetrius Ross as assistant coaches for the 2015 season. Neither Bullocks or Craver would actually coach the Omaha Beef in 2015.

The Beef's announced schedule for the 2015 season was not directly affected when the New Mexico Stars abruptly postponed their entry into the league on February 21, just one week before the season began. On March 3, the Albuquerque-based Duke City Gladiators were announced as a late entry into the league, partially replacing the Stars in the CIF schedule with a plan to play 11 games in 2015.

== Awards and honors ==
Each week of the regular season, the CIF names league-wide Players of the Week in offensive, defensive, and special teams categories. For Week 2, the CIF named running back Jesse Robertson as the Defensive Player of the Week. For Week 7, the CIF named quarterback Chuck Wright as the Offensive Player of the Week. The Omaha Beef failed to place any players on the Champions Indoor Football 2015 1st Team or 2nd Team All-League Honors.

== Schedule ==
Key: Win Tie Loss Bye

=== Pre-season ===
Week	Day	Date	Kickoff	Opponent	Results		Location	Attendance
Week	Day	Date	Kickoff	Opponent	Score	Record	Location	Attendance
1	Friday	February 13	7:05pm	Metro Militia	W 43–0	1–0	Ralston Arena	

=== Regular season ===
Week	Day	Date	Kickoff	Opponent	Results		Location	Attendance
Week	Day	Date	Kickoff	Opponent	Score	Record	Location	Attendance
1	Saturday	February 28	7:05pm	at Sioux City Bandits	L 13–62	0–1	Tyson Events Center	3,848
2	Friday	March 6	7:05pm	Wichita Force	L 42–45	0–2	Ralston Arena	3,847
3	Saturday	March 14	7:05pm	Salina Bombers	L 33–47	0–3	Ralston Arena	3,717
4	BYE							
5	Saturday	March 28	7:05pm	at Salina Bombers	L 7–49	0–4	Bicentennial Center	NA
6	Friday	April 3	7:05pm	at Wichita Force	L 42–59	0–5	Intrust Bank Arena	2,998
7	Friday	April 10	7:05pm	Sioux City Bandits	W 43–41	1–5	Ralston Arena	3,179
8	Saturday	April 18	7:05pm	at Dodge City Law	L 45–69	1–6	United Wireless Arena	2,779
9	Friday	April 24	7:05pm	Sioux City Bandits	L 37–61	1–7	Ralston Arena	3,148
10	BYE							
11	Saturday	May 9	7:05pm	at Salina Bombers	L 13–59	1–8	Bicentennial Center	NA
12	Saturday	May 16	7:05pm	at Sioux City Bandits	L 38–64	1–9	Tyson Events Center	3,021
13	Friday	May 22	7:05pm	Dodge City Law	L 39–64	1–10	Ralston Arena	NA
14	Saturday	May 30	7:05pm	Wichita Force	L 43–52	1–11	Ralston Arena	NA

== Roster ==
2015 Omaha Beef roster
Quarterbacks: 1 Brion Carnes; 11 Kyle Cool; 7 Chuck Wright; Running backs: 15 A. J. Downs; Wide receivers: 14 Allen Daniels; 5 Kayne Farquharson; 17 Brandon Kinnie; 4 Trayon Nash; 82 Brian Boro	Offensive linemen: 65 Clinton Barley; 77 James Davis; 50 Patrick Harrington; -- Julius Nero; Defensive linemen: 2 Davon Bridges; 93 Anthony Brock; 97 DeMichael McWilliams; 41 Robert Smith	Linebackers: 9 Jesse Robertson; 18 Steven Rush; Defensive backs: 8 Quinton Abraham; 10 Antonio Bell; 3 Stephen McCord; 22 Alsid Panteau; 20 Oscar Vaszuez; Kickers: 13 Todd Adolf	Injured Reserve: currently vacant; Transfer List: currently vacant; Refuse to Report: currently vacant; Roster updated May 23, 2015; 24 Active, 0 Inactive → More rosters

== Standings ==
2015 Champions Indoor Football
	W	L	PCT	PF	PA
z-Sioux City Bandits	9	3	.750	697	536
y-Texas Revolution	8	4	.667	638	475
x-Wichita Force	8	4	.667	553	536
x-Amarillo Venom	7	5	.583	647	598
Dodge City Law	7	5	.583	635	578
Salina Bombers	6	5	.545	538	483
Duke City Gladiators	4	4	.500	403	389
San Angelo Bandits	1	10	.091	388	627
Omaha Beef	1	11	.083	395	672

x = clinched playoffs, y = clinched home playoffs, z = clinched top seed

== Playoffs ==
Semifinals
3	Wichita	27
2	Texas	39
4	Amarillo	52
1	Sioux City	83

Champions Bowl I
2	Texas	61
1	Sioux City	76
