= Nate Davis (quarterback) =

American football player (born 1987)

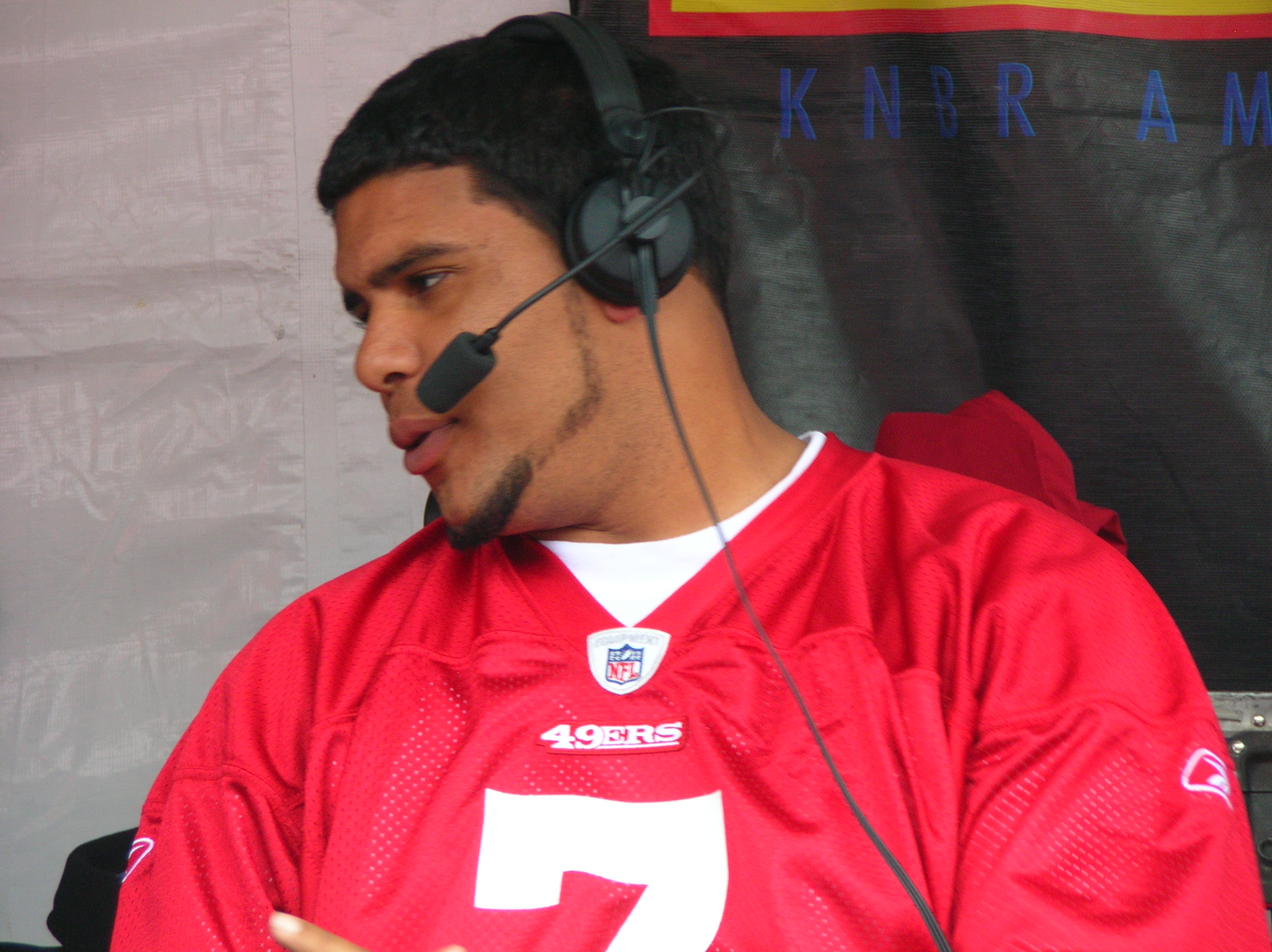
- Davis with the San Francisco 49ers in 2009

No. 8 – San Diego Strike Force
- Position: Quarterback
- Roster status: Active

Personal information
- Born: May 25, 1987 (age 39); Bellaire, Ohio, U.S.
- Listed height: 6 ft 1 in (1.85 m)
- Listed weight: 226 lb (103 kg)

Career information
- High school: Bellaire
- College: Ball State (2006–2008)
- NFL draft: 2009: 5th round, 171st overall pick

Career history
- San Francisco 49ers (2009–2010); Seattle Seahawks (2010)*; Indianapolis Colts (2011)*; Kansas City Command (2012); Orlando Predators (2012); Amarillo Venom (2012–2013); San Antonio Talons (2013); Rio Grande Valley Sol (2014); Amarillo Venom (2015–2019); Duke City Gladiators (2020–2023); San Diego Strike Force (2023–present)
- * Offseason or practice squad member only

Awards and highlights
- IFL Offensive Player of the Year (2021); First-team All-IFL (2021); Second-team All-IFL (2026); First-team CIF Southern Conference (2017); 2× Lone Star Bowl champion (2012, 2013); LSFL Co-Offensive MVP (2013); MAC Offensive Player of the Year (2008); First-team All-MAC (2008); Second-team All-MAC (2007)

Career AFL statistics
- TD–INT: 9–5
- Passing yards: 544
- Passer rating: 68.01
- Stats at ArenaFan.com
- Stats at Pro Football Reference

Nate Charles Davis (born May 25, 1987) is an American professional football quarterback for the San Diego Strike Force of the Indoor Football League (IFL). He played college football for the Ball State Cardinals. He was selected by the San Francisco 49ers in the fifth round of the 2009 NFL draft.

== Early life ==
Nate Charles Davis was born on May 25, 1987, in Bellaire, Ohio. He attended Bellaire High School.

== College career ==
=== 2006 season ===
Davis started the season at Ball State University as a backup to senior quarterback Joey Lynch. In week 1, Davis made his Cardinals debut against Eastern Michigan where he completed 7–8 attempts for 108 yards and three touchdowns. After starting the season 1–3 with a loss to FCS opponent North Dakota State, the Cardinals turned to Davis in Week 5 to start. In his first career start against Northern Illinois he threw for 298 yards and four touchdowns on 27–38 attempts. The following week, Davis was 11–14 for 247 yards and three touchdowns against Buffalo in their first win since the season opener. On the season, Davis appeared in all 12 games, starting seven and threw for 18 touchdowns and 1,975 yards.

=== 2007 season ===
In 2007, Davis set the Ball State single-season record with 3,667 passing yards, on 270–478 attempts. He also set a single-season record 30 touchdown passes. In week 4, Davis threw for a career-high 422 yards against number 24 ranked Nebraska. He was named Second Team All-MAC.

=== 2008 season ===
In 2008, Davis led the Cardinals to 12 straight victories to start the season. Heading into the 2008 MAC Championship Game, the Cardinals were ranked 12th in the country, their highest-ever national ranking. The Cardinals fell to Buffalo in the championship game following five turnovers involving Davis. Davis was named 2008 MAC Offensive Player of the Year and First Team All-MAC. Davis set Ball State career records for passing yards, touchdown passes, completions and total offense. He was the first Cardinal to throw for over 3,000 yards in consecutive seasons. On January 13, 2009, Davis announced that he would forgo a senior season to enter the NFL draft.

In 2021, Davis was inducted in the Ball State Cardinals Hall of Fame.

== Professional career ==
Pre-draft measurables
Height	Weight	Arm length	Hand span	40-yard dash	10-yard split	20-yard split	Vertical jump	Broad jump
6 ft 1 3/8 in (1.86 m)	226 lb (103 kg)	32 in (0.81 m)	9 1/2 in (0.24 m)	5.01 s	1.83 s	2.94 s	26.5 in (0.67 m)	8 ft 3 in (2.51 m)
All values from NFL Combine

=== San Francisco 49ers ===
Davis was selected by the San Francisco 49ers in the fifth round (171st overall) of the 2009 NFL draft. On July 24, 2009, he signed a four-year contract with the team. On August 22, Davis made his professional debut in a preseason game against the Oakland Raiders at Candlestick Park in San Francisco. Entering the game in the third quarter, he led the offense to three fourth-quarter scores, including a two-point conversion, to secure a 21–20 victory. In the following preseason game against the Dallas Cowboys, Davis completed 10 of 15 passes for 132 yards and led two scoring drives in the fourth quarter of a 20–13 victory. He spent the entire 2009 season inactive as the 49ers' third-string quarterback behind Alex Smith and Shaun Hill.

During the 2010 preseason, Davis drew attention after completing a 60-yard pass to wide receiver Ted Ginn Jr., with the throw estimated to have traveled more than 65 yards in the air. NBC commentator Cris Collinsworth compared Davis' arm strength to that of John Elway. Following the team's final preseason game, Davis was waived by the 49ers on September 6, 2010. He re-signed with the team's practice squad two days later, where he spent the remainder of the season.

=== Seattle Seahawks ===
Davis signed with the Seattle Seahawks practice squad on January 11, 2011, but was released on March 3.

=== Indianapolis Colts ===
On July 26, 2011, Davis signed a two-year contract with the Indianapolis Colts. He appeared in the Colts' first preseason game, completing three of seven passes for 36 yards against the St. Louis Rams. Davis was waived by the Colts on August 15, prior to their second preseason game.

=== Kansas City Command ===
Davis signed with the Kansas City Command of the Arena Football League (AFL) on September 26, 2011. He won the starting quarterback job entering the 2012 season. He made his AFL debut against the Jacksonville Sharks, completing 11 of 19 passes for 177 yards, three touchdowns, and one interception in a 52–28 loss. The following week against the Cleveland Gladiators, he completed 17 of 42 passes for 194 yards and a career-high five touchdowns, but also threw three interceptions in another loss. In his third game against the Arizona Rattlers, he completed 14 of 29 passes for 173 yards with one touchdown and one interception while adding two rushing touchdowns before being replaced by Steven Gachette in the loss. Following the game, the Command acquired Matt Gutierrez and Zack Eskridge, and Davis was subsequently released.

=== Orlando Predators ===
On April 17, 2012, Davis was assigned to the Orlando Predators of the Arena Football League (AFL). Davis served as the backup quarterback to Justin Roper in the Predators' Week 7 matchup against the Georgia Force and did not play. Following the victory, the Predators added Chris Leak to the roster, and Davis was placed on reassignment on April 25.

=== Amarillo Venom (first stint) ===
On May 10, 2012, Davis signed with the Amarillo Venom of the Lone Star Football League (LSFL). On July 5, Davis was named LSFL Offensive Player of the Week after completing 27 of 48 passes for 411 yards and eight touchdowns in a victory over the Abilene Ruff Riders. He led the Venom to six wins in their final eight games of the season and helped the team capture the LSFL championship with a 62–40 victory over the Rio Grande Valley Magic. For his performance, Davis was named to the All-LSFL First Team. On February 7, 2013, it was announced that Davis re-signed with the Venom for the 2013 season. After the first two games of the 2013 season, Davis left the Venom after reportedly receiving an opportunity to return to the Arena Football League.

=== San Antonio Talons ===
On April 9, 2013, Davis was assigned to the San Antonio Talons of the Arena Football League (AFL) after starting quarterback John Dutton suffered a season-ending torn achilles injury and backup quarterback Rohan Davey was sidelined with a foot injury. The following day, the Talons signed Nick Hill, who ultimately started the team's Week 4 game against the Tampa Bay Storm. Davis was placed on the suspended list on April 15 and later returned to Amarillo prior to San Antonio's next game against the Arizona Rattlers.

=== Amarillo Venom (second stint) ===
Amid the quarterback changes in San Antonio, Davis returned to the Amarillo Venom following his brief stint with the San Antonio Talons after Hill was named the Talons' starting quarterback. He watched from the stands during Amarillo's next game against the Laredo Rattlesnakes while serving a one-game suspension stemming from a penalty committed in the team's April 6 game against the Abilene Bombers. In his first game back with the Venom against Abilene, Davis threw for 196 yards and six touchdowns in a 63–41 victory that began a seven-game winning streak. Following the regular season, Davis shared LSFL Co-Offensive MVP honors with New Mexico Stars quarterback Kasey Peters. Davis later led Amarillo to a victory over Laredo in the championship game, engineering the game-winning drive in the final minute. For his performance, he was named the championship game's Most Valuable Player.

=== Rio Grande Valley Sol ===
Davis signed with the Rio Grande Valley Sol of the Lone Star Football League (LSFL) for the 2014 season. He made his Sol debut in the season opener, completing 13 of 25 passes for 263 yards and eight touchdowns in a 79–46 victory over the San Angelo Bandits. During the season, Davis helped lead the Sol to an 8–4 regular season record, including eight games in which the team scored at least 60 points and a season-high 92 points against San Angelo.

=== Amarillo Venom (third stint) ===
On November 20, 2014, Davis signed with the Amarillo Venom, who had moved to Champions Indoor Football (CIF). In the Venom's CIF debut against the Dodge City Law, Davis completed 18 of 28 passes for 230 yards and six touchdowns while adding two rushing touchdowns in a 68–63 victory. For his performance, he was named CIF Offensive Player of the Week. In the postseason, Davis and the Venom were defeated by the Sioux City Bandits 83–52, finishing the season with a 7–6 record. Davis completed 17 of 39 passes for 164 yards and five touchdowns, but also threw three interceptions in the loss. Davis returned as the Venom's starting quarterback for the 2016 season. He led the team to the Champions Bowl II, where they lost 48–45 to the Wichita Force. In the championship game, Davis completed 20 of 34 passes for 205 yards and four touchdowns while adding a rushing touchdown. In 2017, Davis led the Amarillo Venom to a 9–3 record and the best record in the CIF South Conference. For his performance, he was named to the All-CIF South Conference First Team. Davis and the Venom advanced to the South Conference Championship, where they were defeated by the Texas Revolution, finishing the season with a 10–4 record. Davis finished the season with 2,980 passing yards, 62 touchdowns, and 13 interceptions. In Davis' sixth season as the Venom's quarterback, he led the team to an 8–4 record and another appearance in the South Conference Championship, where they again fell to the Texas Revolution. Following the season, Davis was named to the All-CIF First Team. In his final season with the Venom, Davis led Amarillo to an 8–5 record while leading the league with 71 touchdown passes and 3,271 passing yards, completing 293 of 458 attempts with 13 interceptions. For his performance, he was named CIF Offensive Player of the Year and CIF Most Valuable Player.

=== Duke City Gladiators ===
Davis signed with the Duke City Gladiators of the Indoor Football League (IFL) for the 2020 season. However, the team's season was later cancelled due to the COVID-19 pandemic. He played for the Gladiators from 2021 to 2023. Davis was named the 2021 IFL Offensive Player of the Year after throwing for a league-record 79 touchdowns.

=== San Diego Strike Force ===
On April 18, 2023, Davis was traded from Duke City to the San Diego Strike Force in exchange for quarterbacks Demry Croft, Aaron Aiken, and offensive lineman Jeremiah Caine.

== Career statistics ==
=== AFL ===
Year	Team	Games			Passing								Rushing			
Year	Team	GP	GS	Record	Cmp	Att	Pct	Yds	Y/A	TD	Int	Rtg	Att	Yds	Y/A	TD
2012	KC	3	3	0–3	42	90	46.6	544	6.0	9	5	68.0	9	14	1.5	2
2012	ORL	0	0	—	DNP											
2013	SA	0	0	—	DNP											
Career		3	3	0–3	42	90	46.6	544	6.0	9	5	68.0	9	14	1.4	2

=== LSFL/CIF/IFL ===
Completed through 2026 season

Year	Team	League	GP	Passing								Rushing			
Year	Team	League	GP	Cmp	Att	Pct	Yds	Y/A	TD	Int	Rtg	Att	Yds	Avg	TD
2012	Amarillo	LSFL	10	212	381	55.6	2,967	7.7	65	17	101.8	31	47	0.6	5
2013	Amarillo (Note: 12 of 13 games were recorded for the 2013 season. Davis was not with the team 4/13 and 4/20. No statistics were recorded on 5/11)	LSFL	10	188	332	56.6	2,181	6.5	54	8	106.1	30	207	6.9	10
2014	Rio Grande (Note: 9 of 12 games were recorded for the 2014 season. No statistics were recorded on 4/12, 5/17, 6/21)	LSFL	9	159	282	56.3	2,252	7.9	50	10	107.1	41	137	3.3	15
2015	Amarillo	CIF	13	209	386	54.1	2,375	6.1	55	15	145.1	62	247	4.0	9
2016	Amarillo	CIF	15	225	457	55.8	3,138	6.8	60	10	152.4	77	286	3.7	23
2017	Amarillo	CIF	14	282	464	60.8	2,980	6.4	62	13	153.2	81	248	3.1	22
2018	Amarillo	CIF	12	203	373	54.4	2,487	6.6	56	10	154.6	71	15	1.3	13
2019	Amarillo	CIF	12	293	458	64.0	3,271	7.1	73	13	171.6	59	110	1.9	11
2020	Duke City	IFL	0	Season cancelled (COVID-19 pandemic)											
2021	Duke City	IFL	14	232	362	64.0	2,901	8.0	79	10	197.9	33	191	5.8	7
2022	Duke City	IFL	1	10	21	47.6	179	8.5	2	1	141.1	3	14	4.7	0
2023	Duke City	IFL	4	67	105	63.8	712	6.7	19	5	171.0	4	0	0.0	0
2023	San Diego	IFL	10	169	288	58.7	2,120	7.3	48	8	170.0	5	25	5.0	2
2024	San Diego	IFL	15	259	426	61.0	2,751	6.5	66	17	158.2	26	48	1.8	2
2025	San Diego	IFL	15	237	377	62.9	2,680	7.1	49	7	161.8	27	30	1.1	5
2026	San Diego	IFL	17	280	461	60.7	3,211	7.0	64	13	159.4	28	82	2.9	3
Career			171	3,025	5,173	58.5	36,205	7.0	802	157	106.8	578	1,687	2.9	127

=== College ===
Year	Team	Games			Passing								Rushing			
Year	Team	GP	GS	Record	Cmp	Att	Pct	Yds	Y/A	TD	Int	Rtg	Att	Yds	Avg	TD
2006	Ball State	12	7	3–4	150	245	61.2	1,975	8.1	18	8	146.7	29	−48	−1.7	0
2007	Ball State	13	13	7–6	270	478	56.5	3,667	7.7	30	6	139.1	78	235	3.0	5
2008	Ball State	14	14	12–2	258	401	64.3	3,591	9.0	26	8	157.0	66	312	4.7	5
Career		39	34	22–12	678	1,124	60.3	9,233	8.2	74	22	147.1	173	499	2.9	10

== Personal life ==
Davis' brother Jose was a professional quarterback in the Arena Football League. Jose attended Kent State from 1997 to 1999 and holds the Mid-American Conference single-game record accounting for eight total touchdowns against Central Michigan. In 2009, Jose was named head football coach at Bellaire High School, where the brothers both played.

Nate was a four-year letter winner in basketball at Bellaire. He broke the school's record for most points and rebounds in a career amassing over 2,500 points and 1,100+ boards. He also holds the school's record for most touchdown passes (83) and most passing yards (7,348).

Davis has dyslexia.
