= 2015 Wichita Force season =

- Owner: Wichita Indoor Football LLC
- General manager: Ashley Lawless
- Head coach: Paco Martinez
- Home stadium: Intrust Bank Arena

Results
- Record: 8-4
- League place: 3rd
- Playoffs: Lost semi-finals (Revolution) 27-39

The 2015 Wichita Force season is the team's first season as a professional indoor football franchise and first as a member of Champions Indoor Football (CIF). One of nine teams in the CIF for the inaugural 2015 season, the Wichita Force is owned by Wichita Indoor Football LLC, led by managing partner Marv Fisher. The Force play their home games at the Intrust Bank Arena in Wichita, Kansas, under the direction of head coach Paco Martinez.

== Season summary ==
The Force's announced schedule for the 2015 season was not directly affected when the New Mexico Stars abruptly postponed their entry into the league on February 21, just one week before the season began. On March 3, the Albuquerque-based Duke City Gladiators were announced as a late entry into the league, partially replacing the Stars in the CIF schedule with a plan to play 11 games in 2015.

== Off-field moves ==
After the 2014 season ended, the Champions Professional Indoor Football League announced it was merging with teams from other leagues to form a new league, Champions Indoor Football. The Wichita Wild franchise folded after eight seasons and a new ownership group launched the Wichita Force as an expansion franchise in the CIF with the Wild's head coach and a significant number of their former players.

== Awards and honors ==
Each week of the regular season, the CIF named league-wide Players of the Week in offensive, defensive, and special teams categories. For Week 1, the CIF named running back Tywon Hubbard as one of two Special Teams Players of the Week. For Week 2, the CIF named kick returner Clarence Anderson as the Special Teams Player of the Week. For Week 6, the CIF again named kick returner Clarence Anderson as the Special Teams Player of the Week. For Week 9, the CIF named kicker Ernesto Lacayo as the Special Teams Player of the Week. For Week 11, the CIF again named kicker Ernesto Lacayo as the Special Teams Player of the Week. For Week 13, the CIF yet again named kick returner Clarence Anderson as the Special Teams Player of the Week. For Week 14, the CIF named quarterback Emmanuel Taylor as the Offensive Player of the Week.

== Schedule ==
Key: Win Tie Loss Bye

=== Regular season ===
Week	Day	Date	Kickoff	Opponent	Results		Location	Attendance
Week	Day	Date	Kickoff	Opponent	Score	Record	Location	Attendance
1	Saturday	February 28	7:05pm	Salina Bombers	L 61–64	0–1	Intrust Bank Arena	3,900
2	Friday	March 6	7:05pm	at Omaha Beef	W 45–42	1–1	Ralston Arena	3,847
3	BYE							
4	Saturday	March 21	7:05pm	at Amarillo Venom	W 43–30	2–1	Amarillo Civic Center	3,200
5	Saturday	March 28	7:05pm	Sioux City Bandits	W 42–35	3–1	Intrust Bank Arena	3,271
6	Friday	April 3	7:05pm	Omaha Beef	W 59–42	4–1	Intrust Bank Arena	2,998
7	Saturday	April 11	7:05pm	at Texas Revolution	L 21–48	4–2	Allen Event Center	3,556
8	BYE							
9	Saturday	April 25	7:05pm	at Salina Bombers	W 45–32	5–2	Bicentennial Center	NA
10	Saturday	May 2	7:05pm	at Sioux City Bandits	L 42–56	5–3	Tyson Events Center	2,854
11	Friday	May 8	7:05pm	Dodge City Law	W 52–49	6–3	Intrust Bank Arena	3,576
12	Saturday	May 16	7:05pm	Salina Bombers	W 46–40 (OT)	7–3	Intrust Bank Arena	2,117
13	Saturday	May 23	7:05pm	Sioux City Bandits	L 45–55	7–4	Intrust Bank Arena	3,951
14	Saturday	May 30	7:05pm	at Omaha Beef	W 52–43	8–4	Ralston Arena	NA

=== Post-season ===
Round	Day	Date	Kickoff	Opponent	Results		Location	Attendance
Round	Day	Date	Kickoff	Opponent	Score	Record	Location	Attendance
Semi-final	Thursday	June 11	7:00pm	at Texas Revolution	L 39–27	0–1	Allen Event Center	2,144

== Roster ==
2015 Wichita Force roster
Quarterbacks: 8 Emmanuel Taylor; 23 Jonathan Wright; Running back: 22 Tywon Hubbard; Wide receivers: 9 Clarence Anderson; 6 Rashad Daniels; 11 Brian Murph; 10 Brett Soft; 2 Dontel Watkins	Offensive linemen: 53 Brett Cavanah; 76 Darren Marquez; 66 Wes Yarbough; Defensive linemen: 51 Latavious Davis; 92 Brandon Jenkins; 99 Matt Moss; 50 Brandon Russell	Linebackers: 1 Jason Catchings; 3 Chris Hemphill; Defensive backs: 4 Kiaree Daniels; 24 Kendrick Harper; 21 Evan Ray; 12 Dorrian Roberts; Kickers: 5 Connor Frazell	Injured Reserve: 3 Rocky Hinds QB; 7 Joe Kassanavoid QB; Transfer List: 29 Ernesto Lacayo K; Refuse to Report: currently vacant; Roster updated June 11, 2015; 21 Active, 0 Inactive → More rosters

== Standings ==
2015 Champions Indoor Football
	W	L	PCT	PF	PA
z-Sioux City Bandits	9	3	.750	697	536
y-Texas Revolution	8	4	.667	638	475
x-Wichita Force	8	4	.667	553	536
x-Amarillo Venom	7	5	.583	647	598
Dodge City Law	7	5	.583	635	578
Salina Bombers	6	5	.545	538	483
Duke City Gladiators	4	4	.500	403	389
San Angelo Bandits	1	10	.091	388	627
Omaha Beef	1	11	.083	395	672

x = clinched playoffs, y = clinched home playoffs, z = clinched top seed

== Playoffs ==
Semifinals
3	Wichita	27
2	Texas	39
4	Amarillo	52
1	Sioux City	83

Champions Bowl I
2	Texas	61
1	Sioux City	76
