= Kasey Peters =

American football player (born 1987)

No. 12, 7, 11, 9
- Position: Quarterback

Personal information
- Born: May 20, 1987 (age 39)
- Listed height: 6 ft 3 in (1.91 m)
- Listed weight: 215 lb (98 kg)

Career information
- High school: Newport Harbor (Newport Beach, California)
- College: Saddleback (2005); Santa Ana (2006); Grand Valley State (2007); Rocky Mountain (2008–2010)
- NFL draft: 2011: undrafted

Career history
- Tri-Cities Fever (2012–2013); New Mexico Stars (2013); West Texas Wildcatters (2014); New Mexico Stars (2015)*; Duke City Gladiators (2015); Las Vegas Outlaws (2015); New Orleans VooDoo (2015); Portland Steel (2016); Duke City Gladiators (2016); Monterrey Steel (2017); Fundidores de Monterrey (2019)
- * Offseason or practice squad member only

Awards and highlights
- LSFL Co-Offensive MVP (2013); 2× Frontier Conference Co-Offensive Player of the Year (2009–2010); 2× First-team All-Frontier (2009–2010); Second-team All-Frontier (2008); Second-team MFC National Division (2006)

Career AFL statistics
- Comp. / Att.: 32 / 76
- Passing yards: 338
- TD–INT: 4–3
- QB rating: 52.41
- Stats at ArenaFan.com

Kasey P. Peters (born May 20, 1987) is an American former professional football quarterback who played in the Arena Football League (AFL) for the Las Vegas Outlaws, New Orleans VooDoo, and Portland Steel. He played college football at Saddleback, Santa Ana, Grand Valley State and Rocky Mountain, and was a three-time honorable mention All-American during his college career. While at Rocky Mountain, he was the Frontier Conference Co-Offensive Player of the Year in both 2009 and 2010 as well. Professionally, he was also a member of the Tri-Cities Fever of the Indoor Football League (IFL), the New Mexico Stars and West Texas Wildcatters of the Lone Star Football League (LSFL), the Duke City Gladiators of Champions Indoor Football (CIF), the Monterrey Steel of the National Arena League (NAL), and the Fundidores de Monterrey of the Liga de Fútbol Americano Profesional (LFA). Peters was named the LSFL Co-Offensive MVP in 2013 after throwing for 1,973 yards, 49 touchdowns and three interceptions in seven games. He started one game for the Portland Steel of the AFL in 2016.

== Early life ==
Kasey P. Peters was born on May 20, 1987. He played high school football at Newport Harbor High School in Newport Beach, California. He threw for 13 touchdowns and 2 interceptions his junior year in 2003 before suffering a season-ending broken collarbone in the seventh game of the season. (Note: One source says he completed 73 of 128 passes for 1,000 yards in 2003 while another says he completed 69 of 125 passes for 936 yards in 2003.) Peters was named to the Daily Pilot's football dream team in 2003. He completed 156 of 274 passes for 2,140 yards and 23 touchdowns his senior year in 2004 while helping Newport Harbor advance to the California Interscholastic Federation (CIF) Southern Section Division VI championship game, where they lost to Orange Lutheran High School by a score of 35–6. Newport Harbor finished the season with an overall record of 12–1–1 as Peters earned All-CIF, Sea View League Offensive Player of the Year and first-team All-Sea View honors. He also played in the Orange County All-Star Game, was named to the Daily Pilot's Dream Team and was named the Daily Pilot's Dream Team Player of the Year in 2004. Peters threw for career totals of 3,700 yards, 39 touchdowns and nine interceptions at Newport Harbor High. He had a 17–3–1 record as a starter.

== College career ==
Peters played college football for the Saddleback Gauchos of Saddleback College in 2005. He did not play in the first game of the season and then played the second half of the second game before playing the majority of the third game. In the fourth game of the year, he broke a bone in his right throwing arm in the first quarter and missed the rest of the season.

Peters transferred to play for the Santa Ana College Dons in 2006. He set single-season school records in completions with 203, passing attempts with 363, passing yards with 2,588 and passing touchdowns with 25. He threw eleven interceptions. He also earned J.C. Grid-Wire honorable mention All-American honors and second-team Mission Football Conference National Division recognition. Peters led the Dons to a 7–4 record and a berth in the Western States Bowl.

In the class of 2007, Peters was rated a two-star recruit by Rivals.com and a three-star recruit by Scout.com. Peters was also rated the No. 18 junior college quarterback in the country by Scout.com. He decided to join the Grand Valley State Lakers of Grand Valley State University. In April 2007, he was listed as the No. 2 quarterback on the depth chart for the Lakers, who were coming off a 15–0 season. In late August 2007, he was once again listed No. 2 on the depth chart. However, he ended up redshirting for the Lakers that year and left the school after the 2007 season. He majored in business while at Grand Valley State.

After leaving Grand Valley State, Peters was unsure if he wanted to continue pursuing football. In 2008, he joined the Rocky Mountain Battlin' Bears of Rocky Mountain College after being recruited by offensive coordinator Brian Armstrong. Peters played in a spread offense while at Rocky Mountain. He completed 322 of 516 passes for 3,541 yards, 27 touchdowns and 13 interceptions while also rushing for 40 yards and 1 touchdown during the 2008 season, earning second-team All-Frontier Conference honors, as the Battlin' Bears finished with a 4–7 record. He led the Frontier Conference in total offense with 3,581 yards and total offense per game with 325.5 yards in 2008. Peters completed 383 of 588 passes for 4,160 yards, 31 touchdowns and 6 interceptions while also rushing for 278 yards and 2 touchdowns in 2009, earning first-team All-Frontier and CollegeFanz Sports Network NAIA honorable mention All-American honors. He shared the Frontier Conference Co-Offensive Player of the Year award with Eastern Oregon quarterback Chris Ware. Peters led the Frontier Conference with 4,438 yards of total offense and the NAIA with 403.5 yards of total offense per game in 2009. He was named the NAIA Offensive Player of the Week for Week 7 of the 2009 season after completing 40 of 47 passes for 471 yards and 6 touchdowns while also scoring a rushing touchdown in a 52–27 win against Montana State–Northern. Despite Peters' strong season, the Battlin' Bears went 2–9 in 2009. Upon appeal, he was granted another year of eligibility but he would have to sit out the first three games of the 2010 season. Peters ran the scout team while sitting out the first three games. Upon his return, he completed 177 of 274 passes for 2,330 yards, 22 touchdowns and 7 interceptions while also rushing for 390 yards and 3 touchdowns in 2010, earning first-team All-Frontier and Victory Sports Network NAIA honorable mention All-American honors. He shared Frontier Conference Co-Offensive Player of the Year honors with Carroll quarterback Gary Wagner. Rocky Mountain ended the year with a 6–5 record. Peters set since-broken school records for career passing yards and yards of total offense with 10,031 and 10,739, respectively. He scored 86 total touchdowns at Rocky Mountain and was the third quarterback in Frontier Conference history to record 10,000 yards of total offense. He played in the Victory Sports Network Senior Classic in April 2011, recording 12 completions on 23 passing attempts for 191 yards, one touchdown, and one interception as the "Americans" lost to the "Nationals" by a score of 17–13. Peters majored in sports management at Rocky Mountain.

== Professional career ==
Peters was rated the 63rd best quarterback in the 2011 NFL draft by NFLDraftScout.com.

Pre-draft measurables
Height	Weight	40-yard dash	10-yard split	20-yard split	20-yard shuttle	Three-cone drill	Vertical jump	Broad jump
6 ft 2 in (1.88 m)	224 lb (102 kg)	4.82 s	1.71 s	2.82 s	4.97 s	6.90 s	28 in (0.71 m)	8 ft 8 in (2.64 m)
All values from Montana Pro Day

Peters signed with the Tri-Cities Fever of the Indoor Football League (IFL) in December 2011. He played in 5 games during the 2012 season, completing 8 of 11 passes for 31 yards and 1 touchdown as the backup to Houston Lillard. In 2013, he became the Fever's starter after Lillard's departure. Peters started the first five games of the 2013 season, completing 76 of 151 passes for 690 yards, 12 touchdowns and 8 interceptions. He also rushed for 43 yards and 1 touchdown. He accumulated a 1–4 record with the Fever and was released by the team on April 8, 2013, after three straight losses.

Peters signed with the New Mexico Stars of the Lone Star Football League (LSFL) in April 2013. He threw for 1,973 yards, 49 touchdowns and three interceptions in seven games. He shared LSFL Co-Offensive MVP honors with Amarillo Venom quarterback Nate Davis. Peters earned LSFL Offensive Player of the Week honors for the final week of the regular season after completing 19 of 22 passes for 336 yards, an LSFL-record 12 touchdowns and 1 interception as the Stars beat the San Angelo Bandits by a score of 89–42. The Stars finished the season with a 6–6 record and earned a playoff berth. He completed 27 of 48 passes for 339 yards and 7 touchdowns in the Stars' playoff game, a 61–56 loss to the Laredo Rattlesnakes. He also threw an interception in the final minute of the game. In August 2013, it was reported that Peters had been invited to an invite-only tryout with the Iowa Barnstormers of the Arena Football League (AFL) in October 2013.

In 2013, he signed with the West Texas Wildcatters of the LSFL for the 2014 season. He suffered a season-ending Achilles injury early in the season.

Peters re-signed with the New Mexico Stars, who were now a member of Champions Indoor Football (CIF), for the 2015 season. However, the Stars shut down operations before the start of the season and Peters then signed with the CIF's Duke City Gladiators. He played in 8 games for the Gladiators during the 2015 season, completing 164 of 303 passes for 1,918 yards, 34 touchdowns and 8 interceptions. He also rushed for one touchdown. Peters led the CIF in passing yards per game with 239.8 and total offense per game with 238.2 yards. He was named the CIF Offensive Player of the Week for Week 12 after completing 31 of 45 passes for 390 yards and 8 touchdowns with no interceptions in an 89–86 overtime loss to the Amarillo Venom on May 16. He also scored a rushing touchdown against the Venom.

Peters was assigned to the Las Vegas Outlaws of the AFL on June 26, 2015. He relieved starter Dennis Havrilla on July 11, 2015, against the Arizona Rattlers, completing five of twelve passes for 41 yards with two interceptions. He was placed on recallable reassignment on July 14, 2015.

Peters was assigned to the AFL's New Orleans VooDoo on July 28, 2015. He served as a holder during his stint with the VooDoo.

He was assigned to the Portland Steel of the AFL on March 11, 2016. He relieved starter Danny Southwick in the fourth quarter of the team's Week 1 loss to the Rattlers, completing four of fifteen passes for 52 yards and a touchdown. Peters made his first career AFL start on April 30, 2016, in a nationally televised game on CBS Sports Network, completing 23 of 49 passes for 245 yards and three touchdowns with an interception as the Steel lost to the Rattlers 68–21. He was placed on reassignment by the Steel on May 12, 2016.

On May 26, 2016, Peters re-signed with the Gladiators. He played in one game for the Gladiators during the 2016 season, completing 21 of 28 passes for 302 yards, seven touchdowns and two interceptions.

Peters signed with the Monterrey Steel of the National Arena League (NAL) on January 17, 2017. He played in 6 games for the Steel, completing 59 of 117 passes for 632 yards, 14 touchdowns, and 5 interceptions. He also scored a rushing touchdown. Peters was released by the Steel on June 3, 2017.

In January 2019, he was signed by the Fundidores de Monterrey of the Liga de Fútbol Americano Profesional (LFA). He split time with quarterback Rodrigo Maldonado in 2019, completing 36 of 71 passes for 351 yards, four touchdowns, and one interception. Peters was credited with three solo tackles and one defensive interception as well. He also played in the team's postseason game, totaling 26 completions on 42 passing attempts for 450 yards, six touchdowns, and one interception in a 53–47 semifinal loss to the Raptors de Naucalpan in overtime.

=== AFL statistics ===
Year	Team	Passing							Rushing		
Year	Team	Cmp	Att	Pct	Yds	TD	Int	Rtg	Att	Yds	TD
2015	Las Vegas	5	12	41.7	41	0	2	11.46	0	0	0
2016	Portland	27	64	42.2	297	4	1	65.69	3	6	0
Career		32	76	42.1	338	4	3	52.41	3	6	0

== Personal life ==
As of 2021, Peters was living in Cancun, Mexico, teaching football, doing part-time modeling, and selling boats.
