= Brendan Crawford =

American football player (born 1990)

No. 4, 15
- Position: Quarterback

Personal information
- Born: April 16, 1990 (age 36); Palo Alto, California, U.S.
- Listed height: 6 ft 5 in (1.96 m)
- Listed weight: 205 lb (93 kg)

Career information
- High school: El Paso (TX) Chapin
- College: Langston
- NFL draft: 2013: undrafted

Career history
- Amarillo Venom (2013); New Mexico Stars (2013); Wyoming Cavalry (2013); Amarillo Venom (2014); Tampa Bay Storm (2014); San Angelo Bandits (2015); Chicago Eagles (2016); Nebraska Danger (2016); Texas Revolution (2018)

Career AFL statistics
- Comp. / Att.: 3 / 8
- Passing yards: 20
- TD–INT: 0–1
- QB rating: 6.25
- Stats at ArenaFan.com

Brendan Crawford (born April 16, 1990) is an American former professional football quarterback. After jumping around schools, Crawford played his final collegiate season at Langston University.

== Early life ==
Crawford graduated from Captain John L. Chapin High School in El Paso, Texas in 2008.

== College career ==
Crawford began his college career at Grambling State University before transferring to Langston University. Also played quarterback at Central Methodist University in Fayette, Missouri.

== Professional career ==
Crawford began his professional career with the Amarillo Venom of the Lone Star Football League (LSFL). After two games with the Venom, Crawford left the team to join the New Mexico Stars. After just two games with the Stars, Crawford left and joined the Wyoming Cavalry of the Indoor Football League (IFL).

Crawford returned to the Venom at the start of the 2014 season. In May 2014, Crawford was assigned to the Tampa Bay Storm of the Arena Football League (AFL).

In September 2015, Crawford signed with the Chicago Eagles.

On April 27, 2016, Crawford signed with the Nebraska Danger. On May 2, 2016, he was released.

On March 1, 2018, Crawford signed with the Texas Revolution. On March 22, 2018, he was released.
