= Lendy Holmes =

American football player (born 1985)

No. 11, 29, 31
- Position: Safety

Personal information
- Born: October 26, 1985 (age 41); Dallas, Texas, U.S.
- Listed height: 6 ft 1 in (1.85 m)
- Listed weight: 201 lb (91 kg)

Career information
- High school: South Oak Cliff (Dallas)
- College: Oklahoma
- NFL draft: 2009: undrafted

Career history
- Washington Redskins (2009); Sacramento Mountain Lions (2010); Tampa Bay Storm (2012); Texas Revolution (2015)

Awards and highlights
- Second-team All-Big 12 (2008)

Career NFL statistics
- Games played: 8
- Total tackles: 2
- Stats at Pro Football Reference

Lendy Ray Holmes III (born October 26, 1985) is an American former professional football player who was a defensive back for the Washington Redskins of the National Football League (NFL).

Holmes grew up in Dallas, Texas, and graduated from South Oak Cliff High School, where he played defensive back for the football team.

A four star recruit who was rated the 16th best high school football player in Texas, Holmes played college football for the Oklahoma Sooners.

Undrafted by the NFL out of college, Holmes played defensive back for the Texas Revolution of Champions Indoor Football (CIF) in 2009.
