= West Texas Wildcatters =

- Founded: 2013
- Folded: 2014
- League: LSFL (2014)
- Team history: West Texas Wildcatters (2014)
- Based in: Odessa, Texas
- Arena: Ector County Coliseum (2014)
- Colors
- Owner: Justin & Jesse Silvas; Troy Walker; Jerry Dunn; Brad Vaughan
- President: coach = Jon Lyles
- Championships: (0)
- Playoff berths: (0)

The West Texas Wildcatters were a professional indoor football team based in Odessa, Texas. The Wildcatters played their home games at the Ector County Coliseum. The Wildcatters began play in 2014 an expansion team in the Lone Star Football League (LSFL). They had planned on joining the CIF in 2014 during the merger of the LSFL and Champions Professional Indoor Football League (CPIFL), but were left out of the league.

The Wildcatters were the second indoor football team to call Odessa home, following the West Texas Roughnecks (originally the Odessa Roughnecks) which played in Intense Football League in 2004 and again from 2006 to 2008, the National Indoor Football League in 2005, the Indoor Football League from 2009 to 2011 and the LSFL from 2012 to 2013 before folding after they could not find a new owner.

After the 2014 season the Lone Star Football League merged with the Champions Professional Indoor Football League (CPIFL) to become the Champions Indoor Football (CIF). The Venom and Bandits became part of the new league while the Sol joined the X-League Indoor Football (XLIF), but the Wildcatters have made no announcement of which league they would join and are now considered defunct.

== Roster ==
West Texas Wildcatters roster
Quarterbacks: 13 Kyle Jech; Running backs: 22 Robert Elliott; Wide receivers: 4 Desmond Baker; 9 Daryl Brister; 80 Hakim Gadiaga; 30 Bobby Guillory; 49 Dennis Morris	Offensive linemen: 99 Destry Heeskew; 20 Andrae May; 92 Vincent Williams; Defensive Lineman: 90 Antonio Dixon; 34 Aaron Matthews; 44 Lenard Williams	Linebackers: 32 Jacoby Thomas; Defensive backs: 2 Kelly Dawsey; 5 Royel Johnson; 3 Wali Mumi; Kickers: currently vacant	Injured reserve: currently vacant; Exempt List: currently vacant; rookies in italics Roster updated May 28, 2014; 17 Active, 0 Inactive

== Head coaches ==
Name	Term	Regular season				Playoffs		Awards
Name	Term	W	L	T	Win%	W	L	Awards
John Lyles	2014	2	10	0	.167	0	0	

== Season-by-season results ==
League champions	Conference champions	Division champions	Wild card berth	League leader

Season	Team	League	Conference	Division	Regular season				Postseason results
Season	Team	League	Conference	Division	Finish	Wins	Losses	Ties	Postseason results
2014	2014	LSFL			5th	2	10	0	
Totals						2	10	0	All-time regular season record (2014)
Totals						0	0	-	All-time postseason record (2014)
Totals						2	10	0	All-time regular season and postseason record (2014)
