= Champions Bowl I =

Texas Revolution	Sioux City Bandits
(9-4)	(10-3)
61	76
Head coach: Devin Wyman	Head coach: Erv Strohbeen
	1	2	3	4	Total
Texas	19	16	12	14	61
Sioux City	21	14	20	21	76
- Date: June 20
- Stadium: Tyson Events Center
- Location: Sioux City, Iowa, U.S.
- MVP: RB Drew Prohaska (SC)
- Referee: Russell Gray
- Attendance: 3,757

United States TV coverage
- Network: America One

Champions Bowl I was the inaugural title game of Champions Indoor Football. It was played on June 20, 2015, at the Tyson Events Center in Sioux City, Iowa. The one-seed Sioux City Bandits defeated the two-seed Texas Revolution by a score of 76–61 to earn the Champions Cup.

== Road to the Champions Bowl ==
The four teams (ordered by seeding) that made the postseason were the Sioux City Bandits, Texas Revolution, Wichita Force, and Amarillo Venom. On Thursday, June 11, Texas defeated Wichita 39–27. Two days later, Sioux City beat Amarillo 83–52. This pitted Texas against Sioux City in Champions Bowl I on June 20 in Iowa.

2015 Champions Indoor Football
	W	L	PCT	PF	PA
z-Sioux City Bandits	9	3	.750	697	536
y-Texas Revolution	8	4	.667	638	475
x-Wichita Force	8	4	.667	553	536
x-Amarillo Venom	7	5	.583	647	598
Dodge City Law	7	5	.583	635	578
Salina Bombers	6	5	.545	538	483
Duke City Gladiators	4	4	.500	403	389
San Angelo Bandits	1	10	.091	388	627
Omaha Beef	1	11	.083	395	672

x = clinched playoffs, y = clinched home playoffs, z = clinched top seed

Semifinals
3	Wichita	27
2	Texas	39
4	Amarillo	52
1	Sioux City	83

Champions Bowl I
2	Texas	61
1	Sioux City	76

== Game summary ==
The Champions Bowl was a highly anticipated event in both Siouxland and the Dallas-Fort Worth area, as the number one offense (Sioux City) faced the top defense (Texas). It was a well-fought game, especially at halftime, as the score was tied 35–35. But a rushing touchdown for eventual Champions Bowl MVP Drew Prohaska and a Rahn Franklin interception sealed the deal for the Bandits as they defeated the "Revs", 76–61 in front of a raucous crowd.

=== Scoring Summary ===
Scoring summary

Quarter	Time	Drive			Team	Scoring information	Score	
Quarter	Time	Plays	Yards	TOP	Team	Scoring information	Texas Revolution	Sioux City Bandits
1	13:26	2	32	1:34	Sioux City Bandits	Fredrick Bruno 19-yard touchdown reception from Charles Dowdell, Max Martin kick Good	0	7
1	11:06	4	34	2:10	Texas Revolution	Robert Kent Jr. 1-yard touchdown run, Manual Cruz kick Good	7	7
1	10:57	1	38	0:09	Sioux City Bandits	38 yard Kickoff return touchdown by Fredrick Bruno, Max Martin Kick Good	7	14
1	9:49	2	26	0:56	Texas Revolution	Ronald Gaudin 17-yard touchdown reception from Robert Kent Jr., Manual Cruz kick Failed	13	14
1	8:25	2	24	1:18	Sioux City Bandits	Willie Downs 17-yard touchdown reception from Charles Dowdell, Max Martin kick Good	13	21
1	4:34	6	18	3:43	Texas Revolution	Darius Fudge 7-yard touchdown reception from Robert Kent Jr., 2-point pass from Frankie Solomon, Jr. Failed	19	21
2	13:06	9	35	4:12	Texas Revolution	Robert Williams 1-yard touchdown run, 2-point rush by Robert Kent Jr. Failed	25	21
2	9:06	7	39	3:50	Sioux City Bandits	Drew Prohaska 1-yard touchdown run, Max Martin kick Good	25	28
2	4:21	6	41	4:36	Texas Revolution	Jordan Brown 21-yard touchdown reception from Robert Kent Jr., Manual Cruz kick Good	32	28
2	3:14	2	21	1:00	Sioux City Bandits	Fredrick Bruno 20-yard touchdown reception from Charles Dowdell, Max Martin kick Good	32	35
2	0:17	8	31	2:34	Texas Revolution	22-yard field goal by Manual Cruz	35	35
3	14:47	1	55	0:13	Texas Revolution	55 yard Kickoff Return Touchdown by Frankie Solomon, Jr.	41	35
3	9:33	8	18	5:06	Sioux City Bandits	Drew Prohaska 1-yard touchdown run, Max Martin kick Failed	41	41
3	6:58	4	43	2:25	Texas Revolution	Robert Kent Jr. 12-yard touchdown run, Manual Cruz kick Failed	47	41
3	4:46	4	25	2:09	Sioux City Bandits	Johnny Bentley 1-yard touchdown run, Max Martin kick Good	47	48
3	1:02	2	10	0:53	Sioux City Bandits	Drew Prohaska 1-yard touchdown run, Max Martin kick Good	47	55
4	11:48	8	37	4:04	Texas Revolution	Robert Kent Jr. 1-yard touchdown run, 2-point rush by Robert Williams Failed	53	55
4	8:42	6	38	2:55	Sioux City Bandits	Drew Prohaska 3-yard touchdown run, Max Martin kick Good	53	62
4	5:20	1	7	0:45	Sioux City Bandits	John Bentley 7-yard touchdown run, Max Martin kick Good	53	69
4	3:13	4	14	1:45	Texas Revolution	Ronald Gaudin 12-yard touchdown reception from Robert Kent Jr., 2-point Ronald Gaudin Pass Succeeded	61	69
4	2:41	1	39	0:25	Sioux City Bandits	Willie Downs 39-yard touchdown reception from Charles Dowdell, Max Martin kick Good	61	76
"TOP" = time of possession. For other American football terms, see Glossary of American football.							Texas Revolution	Sioux City Bandits
