= Wendell Davis (cornerback) =

American football player (born 1973)

No. 35, 41, 21, 3
- Position: Cornerback

Personal information
- Born: June 27, 1973 (age 53); Wichita, Kansas, U.S.
- Listed height: 5 ft 10 in (1.78 m)
- Listed weight: 201 lb (91 kg)

Career information
- High school: Wichita North
- College: Oklahoma
- NFL draft: 1996: 6th round, 207th overall pick

Career history

Playing
- Dallas Cowboys (1996–1998); Washington Redskins (1999)*; Dallas Cowboys (1999); Calgary Stampeders (2000)*; San Francisco Demons (2001); San Jose SaberCats (2002–2004); Grand Rapids Rampage (2005); San Jose SaberCats (2005); Arizona Rattlers (2006)
- * Offseason or practice squad member only

Coaching
- Wichita Wild (2012); San Antonio Talons (2013); Texas Revolution (2014–2015); San Angelo Bandits (2015); LA KISS (2016)

Awards and highlights
- 2× ArenaBowl champion (2002, 2004)

Career NFL statistics
- Tackles: 13
- Fumble recoveries: 2
- Stats at Pro Football Reference

Career AFL statistics
- Tackles: 122
- Passes defended: 15
- Forced fumbles: 1
- Fumble recoveries: 4
- Interceptions: 3
- Stats at ArenaFan.com

Wendell Davis (born June 27, 1973) is an American former professional football player who was a cornerback in the National Football League (NFL) for the Dallas Cowboys. He served as the head coach of the San Angelo Bandits and the Texas Revolution of the Champions Indoor Football (CIF). He played college football at the University of Oklahoma.

== Early life ==
Davis attended Wichita North High School, where he was a two-time All-City linebacker, while also playing fullback on offense. He was a three-year starter and led the team in tackles in his last two years.

He was also selected All-City in track and field as a senior, after placing second in the 4 × 100 metres relay, third in the 4 × 400 metres relay and third in the 400 metres.

== College career ==
Davis moved on to Coffeyville Community College, where he was converted into a cornerback and became a two-year starter. As a sophomore, he posted 49 tackles, 5 interceptions and 17 passes defensed. He was named All-Jayhawk Conference and honorable-mention NJCAA All-American. He was ranked by Super Prep Magazine as the third-best junior college player in the nation.

He transferred to the University of Oklahoma after his sophomore season. He was redshirted in 1993.

As a junior, he played nickel back under head coach Gary Gibbs. He collected 44 tackles (one for loss), one interception, 2 passes defensed and one fumble recovery. He had 5 tackles and one pass defensed against the University of Colorado in his only start of the year.

As a senior, he registered 25 tackles (2 for loss) and 5 passes defensed. He had 6 tackles (2 for loss) against Nebraska in his only start of the year.

== Professional career ==
=== Dallas Cowboys (first stint) ===
Davis was selected by the Dallas Cowboys in the sixth round (207th overall) of the 1996 NFL draft. He was limited with a strained hamstring during training camp. On August 27, he was waived and signed to the practice squad the next day. On September 6, he was promoted to the active roster. He became one of Cowboys core special teams players, registering 12 tackles (sixth on the team). He also tallied 9 defensive tackles and one pass defensed. He missed the two playoff games with a sprained right knee he suffered in the season finale against the Washington Redskins.

On January 17, 1997, he underwent arthroscopic surgery to repair a lateral meniscus tear in his right knee. On July 30, he sprained his left knee during a workout. On August 1, he underwent arthroscopic surgery after spraining his left knee during a workout. On August 17, he returned to practice. He backed up both corners, finishing the year with four tackles on defense, one forced fumble and 7 special teams tackles.

In 1998, he suffered a torn anterior cruciate ligament in his left knee during the training camp and was lost for the season.

=== Washington Redskins ===
Davis signed with the Washington Redskins as a free agent in 1999. He was waived before the start of the season on September 5.

=== Dallas Cowboys (second stint) ===
On November 16, 1999, he signed with the Dallas Cowboys as a free agent. He wasn't re-signed after the season.

=== Calgary Stampeders ===
Davis signed with the Calgary Stampeders, but was waived before the start of the 2000 season.

=== San Francisco Demons ===
He was selected by the San Francisco Demons in the seventeenth round (134th overall) of the 2001 XFL draft. He recorded 21 tackles and 1 interception, while contributing to the team reaching the championship game. The league folded in May 2001.

=== San Jose SaberCats (first stint) ===
On February 28, 2002, Davis signed with the San Jose SaberCats of the Arena Football League, to play as a defensive specialist. He helped the team win ArenaBowl XVI and ArenaBowl XVIII. He was released in 2005.

=== Grand Rapids Rampage ===
On January 3, 2005, he signed with the Grand Rapids Rampage of the Arena Football League. He was cut on February 8.

=== San Jose SaberCats (second stint) ===
On April 15, 2005, he signed with the San Jose SaberCats of the Arena Football League.

=== Arizona Rattlers ===
In 2006, he signed with the Arizona Rattlers of the Arena Football League. He was placed on the injured reserve list 2 times during the season. He retired on February 1, 2007.

== Personal life ==
Davis was a football assistant coach at Wichita North High School and at Maize High School. He was also an assistant coach for the Wichita Wild of the Indoor Football League and the San Antonio Talons of the Arena Football League.

In August 2014, he was named the head coach and director of football operations of the Texas Revolution of the Champions Indoor Football. On March 30, 2015, Davis agreed to part ways with the Revolution after coaching just four regular season games. On April 14, 2015, the San Angelo Bandits hired Davis as their head coach. In 2016, he was hired as the defensive backs coach for the LA KISS of the Arena Football League.
