= CRC Roofers Coliseum =

Multi-purpose arena in San Angelo, Texas

Coordinates: 31°30′24″N 100°27′37″W

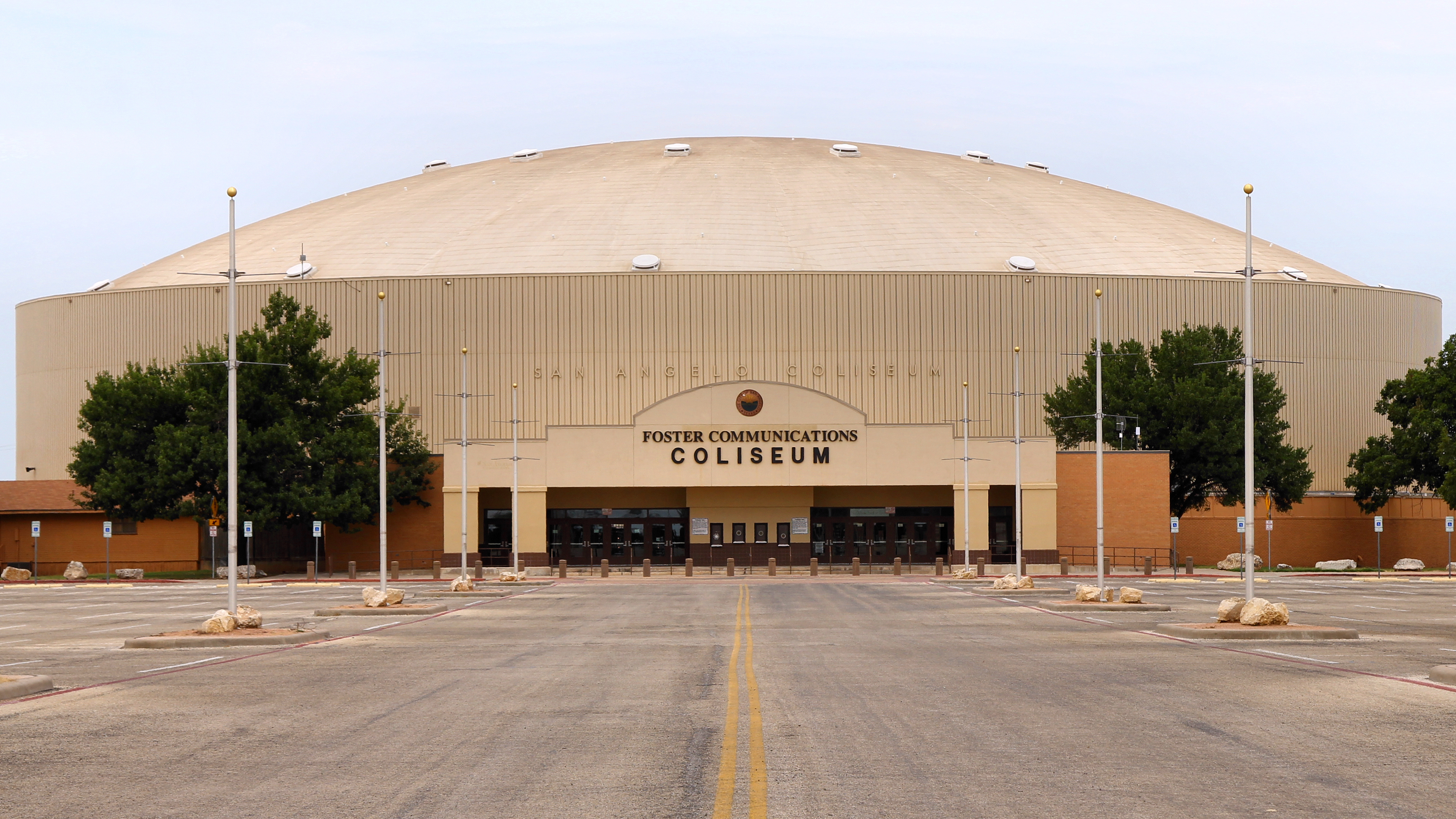
- Interactive map of CRC Roofers Coliseum
- Former names: San Angelo Coliseum (1958–2011) Foster Communications Coliseum (2011–2025)
- Location: 50 East 43rd Street; San Angelo, Texas
- Owner: City of San Angelo
- Capacity: 5,260

Construction
- Groundbreaking: 1957
- Opened: August 29, 1958
- Renovated: 2006

Tenants
- San Angelo Outlaws (WPHL/CHL) (1997–2002); San Angelo Saints (CHL) (2002–2005); San Angelo Stampede Express (NIFL/Intense/IFL) (2004–2010); San Angelo Bandits (LSFL/CIF) (2013–2016)

The CRC Roofers Coliseum is a 5,260-seat multi-purpose arena in San Angelo, Texas, built in 1959 as a home for the San Angelo Stock Show and Rodeo, the fourth largest stock show and rodeo in the United States, after its original home was destroyed in 1953. Throughout the year the coliseum is home to various concerts, trade shows and exhibits and other special events.

In March 2011, the city of San Angelo announced that it sold the naming rights of the San Angelo Coliseum to Foster Communications, thereby renaming it Foster Communications Coliseum. In March 2025, the naming rights changed to CRC Roofers Coliseum.
