= 2015 Champions Indoor Football season =

- League: Champions Indoor Football
- Sport: Indoor football
- Duration: February 28 – June 6

Regular season
- Season MVP: Charles Dowdell (Sioux City)

Champions Bowl I
- Champions: Sioux City Bandits
- Runners-up: Texas Revolution
- Finals MVP: Drew Prohaska

Champions Indoor Football seasons
- ← None 2016 →

The 2015 Champions Indoor Football season was the first season of the CIF. The new league was the result of a merger between the Lone Star Football League and the Champions Professional Indoor Football League. The regular season began on Saturday, February 28 and finished on Saturday, June 6. The league champion was the Sioux City Bandits, who defeated the Texas Revolution 76-61 in Champions Bowl I. The season MVP was Charles Dowdell of the Sioux City Bandits, and the Champions Bowl MVP was Drew Prohaska, also of the Bandits.

== Standings ==
2015 Champions Indoor Football
	W	L	PCT	PF	PA
z-Sioux City Bandits	9	3	.750	697	536
y-Texas Revolution	8	4	.667	638	475
x-Wichita Force	8	4	.667	553	536
x-Amarillo Venom	7	5	.583	647	598
Dodge City Law	7	5	.583	635	578
Salina Bombers	6	5	.545	538	483
Duke City Gladiators	4	4	.500	403	389
San Angelo Bandits	1	10	.091	388	627
Omaha Beef	1	11	.083	395	672

x = clinched playoffs, y = clinched home playoffs, z = clinched top seed

== Playoffs ==
Semifinals
3	Wichita	27
2	Texas	39
4	Amarillo	52
1	Sioux City	83

Champions Bowl I
2	Texas	61
1	Sioux City	76
