= Salina Bombers =

Indoor football team

Logo

General information
- Founded: 2012
- Folded: 2015
- Headquartered: Bicentennial Center in Salina, Kansas
- Colors: Black, Green, Silver, White
- Mascot: Captain Bombardier

Personnel
- Owner: Chris Vercher
- General manager: Pete Jackson
- Head coach: Bob Ray

Team history
- Salina Bombers (2013–2015)

Home fields
- Bicentennial Center (2013–2015)

League / conference affiliations
- Champions Professional Indoor Football League (2013–2014); Champions Indoor Football (2015)

Playoff appearances (2)
- CPIFL: 2013, 2014

The Salina Bombers were a professional indoor football team based in Salina, Kansas. The team was founded by Chris Vercher, Jake Leighty and Jake Sharp in 2012 as charter member of the Champions Professional Indoor Football League (CPIFL). The Bombers played their home games at the Bicentennial Center in Salina. After the Bombers folded, the Salina Liberty were started as a new indoor football franchise.

At the conclusion of the 2014 season, the CPIFL and the Lone Star Football League (LSFL) completed a merger, accepting the Bombers as a charter member of Champions Indoor Football (CIF). On May 28, 2015, the Bombers organization folded, citing a business decision after being ejected from the CIF.

== History ==
As early as October 2, 2012, a Salina team had appeared on the CPIFL website. However, their information was quickly taken down because no arena lease had yet been signed. The team was officially announced on October 18 after having signed a five-year lease with the Bicentennial Center and a "name-the-team" contest took place on the Bicenntenial Center's website. On October 25, the three finalists were announced as the "Salina Storm", "Salina Bombers", and "Salina Shock". The winning name of "Salina Bombers" was announced on November 1.

=== 2013 ===
With a 9-3 record, the Bombers finished fourth in the final CPIFL standings, which qualified the team for the playoffs. The Bombers traveled to Sioux City, Iowa, where they defeated the first seeded Sioux City Bandits to advance to the Champions Bowl. In the first ever Champions Bowl, the Bombers were defeated 47-34 by the Wichita Wild.

=== 2014 ===
In 2014, the Bombers finished the regular season with a record of 8-4, good enough for third place in the final CPIFL standings. They were soundly defeated by the Bandits 66-37 in Sioux City in the first round of the postseason. Notable players this season included defensive lineman, Meshak Williams.

=== 2015 ===
For 2015, the CPIFL merged with the Lone Star Football League and several other teams to form Champions Indoor Football. The Bombers were one of nine teams to start the 2015 season as members of the CIF. On May 28, the Bombers organization folded, citing business decisions, and cancelled their final two games against the Duke City Gladiators and San Angelo Bandits. The CIF had suspended the Bombers from the league earlier that day. The team was then replaced by the Salina Liberty in July 2015.

== Season-by-season records ==
Season records
Season	W	L	T	Finish	Playoff results
2013	10	4	0	4th League	Won semi-finals (Sioux City); Lost Champions Bowl I (Wichita)
2014	8	5	0	3rd League	Lost semi-finals (Sioux City)
2015	6	5	0	5th League	Suspended from league play
Totals	24	14	0	(including playoffs)	

== Records vs. opponent ==
Opponent	OVERALL	HOME	AWAY	POST
Bloomington Edge	(1-1)	(1-0)	(0-1)	(0-0)
Dodge City Law	(2-2)	(1-1)	(1-1)	(0-0)
Kansas Koyotes	(3-0)	(1-0)	(2-0)	(0-0)
Kansas City Renegades	(1-0)	(0-0)	(1-0)	(0-0)
Lincoln Haymakers	(3-0)	(2-0)	(1-0)	(0-0)
Mid-Missouri Outlaws	(2-0)	(1-0)	(1-0)	(0-0)
Oklahoma Defenders	(3-0)	(1-0)	(2-0)	(0-0)
Omaha Beef	(4-0)	(3-0)	(1-0)	(0-0)
Sioux City Bandits	(2-5)	(0-2)	(2-3)	(1-1)
Texas Revolution	(1-0)	(1-0)	(0-0)	(0-0)
Wichita Force	(1-2)	(0-1)	(1-1)	(0-0)
Wichita Wild	(1-4)	(1-1)	(0-3)	(0-1)

== Awards and honors ==
- 2013 Defensive Rookie of The Year: DeWayne Autrey DB
- 2013 1st Team All CPIFL: Ricky Roberts WR, Jarvis Jones OL, DeWayne Autrey DB
- 2013 CPIFL Offensive MVP: Dane Simoneau QB
- 2013 CPIFL Coach Of Year: Bob Frey
- 2014 1st Team All CPIFL: Ed Prince OL, Meshak Williams DL, DeWayne Autrey DB
- 2014 CPIFL Defensive Player of the Year: Meshak Williams DL
- 2014 CPIFL Defensive Rookie of The Year: Meshak Williams DL
- 2014 CPIFL Best Media Relations/Social Media

== Notable players ==
See Category:Salina Bombers players
