= Dodge City Law =

Logo

General information
- Founded: 2013
- Headquartered: United Wireless Arena in Dodge City, Kansas
- Colors: Graphite, chartreuse, silver
- Mascot: Marshall

Personnel
- Owners: Sean & Joi Ponder (original); Craig Tirey (fill-in team)
- Head coach: Sean Ponder (original); Richard Davis (fill-in team)

Team history
- Dodge City Law (2014–2017, 2021)

Home fields
- United Wireless Arena (2014–2017; 2021)

League / conference affiliations
- Champions Professional Indoor Football League (2014) Champions Indoor Football (2015–2017, 2021): Southern Division (2016); South Conference (2017)

Playoff appearances (4)
- CPIFL: 2014; CIF: 2016, 2017, 2021

The Dodge City Law were a professional indoor football team based in Dodge City, Kansas, with home games at the United Wireless Arena. The team joined the Champions Professional Indoor Football League (CPIFL) in 2013 as an expansion member for the 2014 season. In 2014, the CPIFL merged with the Lone Star Football League (LSFL) to form Champions Indoor Football (CIF). The branding was used again for the 2021 season as a replacement team before an expansion team was granted to the Southwest Kansas Storm for the 2022 season.

== History ==
=== Champions Professional Indoor Football League ===
In September 2013, James Bain, the commissioner of the Champions Professional Indoor Football League (CPIFL) announced that a new expansion team would be coming to Dodge City, Kansas, becoming the tenth team in the league. A name-the-team contest took place in October on the team's website and home office. Over the two weeks, there were over 1,000 submissions. It was decided the team colors would be graphite, chartreuse and silver. Adam McElwain of Hays, Kansas won the contest earning two season tickets for the season. The Law began its inaugural 2014 season with a road win over the Omaha Beef. The team lost the next two games but then won six of the following seven games. The Law finished with an 8–4 record, fourth best in the league, and good enough to qualify for the playoffs. They lost their semi-final game to eventual league champion Wichita Wild 33–31.

In August 2014, the CPIFL and Lone Star Football League announced they would merge as one league called Champions Indoor Football (CIF) beginning with the 2015 season.

=== Champions Indoor Football (2015–2017) ===
In the 2015 season, the Law lost their first CIF game, losing 63–68 to the Amarillo Venom, but then won their next six consecutive games before another late April loss to the Venom. The Law finished the season with a 7–5 record, tied with the Venom, but missed the last playoff spot due to the head-to-head tiebreakers against the Venom. The following 2016 season had the Law finish with an 8–4 record and qualified for the playoffs where the lost to the Venom again the first round.

In the 2017 season, the Law were leading the league with a 9–2 record. On June 2, 2017, the CIF stripped the law of two victories without awarding them to any other team. Reports from other teams and a subsequent investigation found that the Law were in violation of the league's operations manual and guidelines pertaining to uploading video in a timely manner. When asked about the decision, commissioner Ricky Bertz stated, "While this situation was unfortunate and no one in the CIF including the Dodge City Law wanted this to be the final outcome, the board of directors decided that this was what was best for the league given the circumstances and how they related to all team members involved." Ultimately, the team finished with a loss to the Duke City Gladiators in Albuquerque, and a record of 7–5 after the penalty but still made the playoffs. They then lost in the first round at the home of the eventual postseason champions Texas Revolution 59–63.

After the season ended, it was reported that the owners, Sean and Joi Ponder, owed refunds to several ticket holders for the first round playoff game that was originally scheduled to be in Dodge City prior to receiving the league penalty. Two days later, owner Sean Ponder posted that the Law had left the CIF.

=== 2021 relaunch ===
On April 1, 2021, opening week of the 2021 season, the CIF announced the Oklahoma Flying Aces had withdrawn from the league. The Dodge City Law were planned to be relaunched for the 2022 season under new ownership, but were immediately granted active status with the Flying Aces' roster and staff was transferred to the Law. According to new head coach Richard Davis, the new Law team is owned by Oklahoma City business man Craig Tirey. The new Law played their first game on April 10, a 20–18 win over the CIF expansion team, the Wyoming Mustangs. The team qualified for the postseason with a 4–6 record and lost to the Salina Liberty in the first round game.

On October 1, 2021 the Dodge City Law, which had been a temporary replacement for the Oklahoma Flying Aces, was replaced by an expansion team in Dodge City under different ownership called the Southwest Kansas Storm.

== Statistics and records ==
=== Season-by-season results ===
Note: The finish, wins, losses, and ties columns list regular season results and exclude any postseason play.

League champions	Conference champions	Division champions	Playoff berth	League leader

Season	Team	League	Conference	Division	Regular season				Postseason results
Season	Team	League	Conference	Division	Finish	Wins	Losses	Ties	Postseason results
2014	2014	CPIFL			4th	8	4	0	Lost Semifinals (Wichita) 31–33
2015	2015	CIF			5th	7	5	0	
2016	2016	CIF		Southern	3rd	8	4	0	Lost South Divisional (Amarillo) 56–98
2017	2017	CIF	South		3rd	9	3	0	Lost South Divisional (Texas) 59–63
2021	2021	CIF			4th	4	6	0	Lost Semifinal (Salina) 31–55
Totals						32	16	0	All-time regular season record (2014–2021)
Totals						0	3	—	All-time postseason record (2014–2021)
Totals						32	19	0	All-time regular season and postseason record (2016–2021)

=== Vs. opponent ===
Opponent	Overall	Home	Away	Post.
Amarillo Venom	(0–2)	(0–1)	(0–1)	(0–0)
Duke City Gladiators	(1–0)	(0–0)	(1–0)	(0–0)
Kansas Koyotes	(2–0)	(1–0)	(1–0)	(0–0)
Lincoln Haymakers	(1–0)	(1–0)	(0–0)	(0–0)
Oklahoma Defenders	(1–1)	(0–1)	(1–0)	(0–0)
Omaha Beef	(4–0)	(2–0)	(2–0)	(0–0)
Salina Bombers	(2–2)	(1–1)	(1–1)	(0–0)
San Angelo Bandits	(1–0)	(0–0)	(1–0)	(0–0)
Sioux City Bandits	(1–1)	(1–1)	(0–0)	(0–0)
Texas Revolution	(1–0)	(1–0)	(0–0)	(0–0)
Wichita Force	(1–0)	(0–0)	(0–1)	(0–0)
Wichita Wild	(0–3)	(0–1)	(0–2)	(0–1)

== Awards and honors ==
- 2014 CPIFL Franchise of the Year
- 2014 CPIFL Best Game Ops, On-Field Promotion/Dance Team

== Notable players ==
See Category:Dodge City Law players
