= Wichita Force =

Indoor football team in Wichita, Kansas, US

Logo

General information
- Founded: 2014
- Folded: 2022
- Headquartered: Wichita Ice Center in Wichita, Kansas
- Colors: Black, yellow, white
- WichitaForce.com

Personnel
- Owners: Wichita Arena Football, LLC
- Head coach: Ene Akpan

Team history
- Wichita Force (2015–2022)

Home fields
- Intrust Bank Arena (2015–2019); Hartman Arena (2020); Kansas Star Arena (2021); Wichita Ice Center (2022)

League / conference affiliations
- Champions Indoor Football (2015–2021): Northern Division (2016); South Conference (2017–2018); North Conference (2019); Arena Football Association (2022)

Championships
- League championships: 1: CIF: 2016; AFA: 1
- Division championships: 1: CIF: 2016

Playoff appearances (3)
- CIF: 2015, 2016, 2018; AFA: 1

The Wichita Force were a professional indoor football team based in Wichita, Kansas, with home games in Wichita Ice Center. The team was founded in 2014 as an expansion franchise in the Champions Indoor Football league for the 2015 season. The Force's membership in the CIF was revoked prior to the 2022 season and the team joined the new Arena Football Association.

== History ==
For the inaugural 2015 season, the Force hired former Wichita Wild head coach Paco Martinez. The Force opened the season with a home loss to the Salina Bombers, then regrouped to win four consecutive games in a five-week span. After that stretch, results have been mixed with road losses to the two teams that would end up playing in the Champions Bowl—Texas Revolution and Sioux City Bandits—then, a home win over the Salina Bombers, and a road win over the Dodge City Law.

In 2017, the Force underwent an ownership change and head coach Martinez was fired after three seasons with the team. He was replaced by Morris Lolar as the head coach and Stuart Schake was named general manager for the 2018 season. Brian Turner was named general manager for the 2019 season, but head coach Lolar left for a position with Montreal Alouettes of the Canadian Football League and Rick Lee and Jerry Taylor were named co-coaches in March 2019.

For the 2020 season, the Force hired Pat Pimmel as head coach. The team also moved from the larger Intrust Bank Arena, where the team had played for the first five seasons, to the smaller Hartman Arena, where the Wichita Wild used to play. However, the 2020 season never began and was cancelled due to the COVID-19 pandemic closing arenas. The following 2021 season, the season was shortened and delayed as the pandemic restrictions continued. Pat Pimmel left the team and was replaced by Ene Akpan. On April 1, 2021, the Force announced they would play the season out of the Kansas Star Arena in Mulvane. The facility was criticized by some players and was notable for using inflatable walls (this would carry over to the AFA).

In January 2022, the Force were removed from the CIF for not meeting the league's minimum operating requirements. On February 7, 2022, the Force announced they had joined the new Arena Football Association, a league established by former CIF teams, the Amarillo Venom and West Texas Warbirds. The Force also announced they would play 2022 games at the Wichita Ice Center instead of the Kansas Star Center.

== Season-by-season results ==
League champions	Conference champions	Division champions	Playoff berth	League leader

Season	Team	League	Conference	Division	Regular season				Postseason results
Season	Team	League	Conference	Division	Finish	Wins	Losses	Ties	Postseason results
2015	2015	CIF			3rd (Note: During the 2015 season, the CIF did not have divisions. Listed finish is each team's position in the overall league standings.)	8	4	0	Lost Semifinal 27–39 (Texas)
2016	2016	CIF		Northern	1st	10	2	0	Won Divisional Championship 52–51 (Bloomington); Won Champions Bowl II 48–45 (Amarillo)
2017	2017	CIF	South		6th	7	5	0	
2018	2018	CIF	South		4th	4	8	0	Lost Conference Semifinal (Duke City) 39–50
2019	2019	CIF	North		4th	2	10	0	
2020	2020	CIF			Season cancelled due to COVID-19 pandemic				
2021	2021	CIF			5th	4	6	0	
2022	2022	AFA			2nd	6	2	0	AFA Cup 52-6 (Spartans) (did not play due to scheduling conflicts of AFA championship)
Totals						41	37	0	All-time regular season record (2015–2022)
Totals						2	2	—	All-time postseason record (2015–2022)
Totals						43	39	0	All-time regular season and postseason record (2015–2022)
