= Tony's Pizza Events Center =

Arena in Salina, Kansas

- Bi Center, Mid-America's Meeting Place
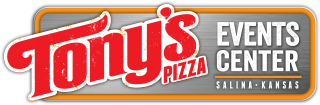

- Location within Kansas Location within the United States
- Former names: Bicentennial Center (1979–2017)
- Location: 800 The Midway; Salina, Kansas 67401
- Coordinates: 38.8346300°N 97.5994896°W
- Owner: City of Salina
- Operator: OVG360
- Capacity: Arena: 7,583

Construction
- Groundbreaking: 1977
- Opened: June 2, 1979

The Tony's Pizza Events Center (formerly known as Bicentennial Center) is a event facility located in Salina, Kansas, United States. It includes a 7,583-seat multipurpose arena, meeting rooms and Heritage Hall, an 18,000 square foot convention center. It is home of the Salina Liberty of the National Arena League, and is nicknamed Mid-America's Meeting Place. The City of Salina is the primary owner of the center. Spectra manages the center as well as more than 100 other public assembly facilities around the world.

== History ==
The first concert at the center was The Osmonds, on June 2, 1979. The concert sold out, and there was a crowd of 7,300.

A variety of events are held at the events center, including concerts, family shows, sport events, trade shows, and conventions. Annual events include: Salina Invitational Basketball Tournament, Salina Home & Leisure Show, Kansas State High School Activities Association (KSHSAA) 4A Wrestling, Basketball and Volleyball State Tournaments, National Junior College Athletic Association (NJCAA) Women's Division I Basketball National Championship, Mid-America Farm Expo, Shrine Circus, Tri-Rivers Fair, and commencements for Salina Area Technical College, Brown Mackie College, and USD 305.

The arena has been home to five professional sports franchises: the Kansas Cagerz of the United States Basketball League (1999–2007), the Salina Rattlers of the International Basketball Association (2000–2001), the Salina Bombers of the Champions Indoor Football league (2013–2015), the Salina Liberty, currently in the National Arena League (2016–present), and the Salina Saints of the American Basketball Association (2016–2019).

On February 22, 2017, the center was renamed from Salina Bicentennial Center to Tony's Pizza Event Center, described as "the largest pizza facility in the world.” Tony's Pizza, a food service subsidiary of Schwan Food Company, paid $1.2 million to receive comprehensive naming rights for 15 years.

=== Name ===
It has undergone the following name changes since it opened:

- Bicentennial Center (original name in 1979 to 2017)
- Tony's Pizza Events Center (2017 to current)
