= Champions Professional Indoor Football League =

US indoor football minor league

- Most recent season or competition: 2014 Champions Professional Indoor Football League season
- Sport: Indoor football
- Founded: 2012
- First season: 2013
- Folded: 2014; merged with LSFL to make CIF
- Director: Bob Scott, Jerry Ploeger, Ethan Henson, John Blazek
- No. of teams: 9
- Country: United States
- Last champion: Wichita Wild (2nd title)
- Most titles: Wichita Wild (2 titles)
- Website: www.cpifl.org

The Champions Professional Indoor Football League (CPIFL) was an indoor football minor league based along the Midwestern United States region. The league began play in February 2013. In August 2014, the CPIFL and Lone Star Football League (LSFL) completed a merger to form Champions Indoor Football (CIF) and began play in 2015.

== Season structure ==
During the off-season, teams held open tryouts for free-agent players to earn invites to pre-season camps. Free agent tryouts ranged from October to January depending on the individual team. Pre-season typically ran the duration of February and could involve exhibition games with teams inside the league or outside teams in other indoor football leagues. The regular season schedule was a 12-game format typically starting in mid-March and going until mid-June. Each team played six home games and six road games, typically on Friday and Saturday nights, with some exceptions like occasional Sunday afternoon games. The four teams with the best overall record at the end of the season qualified for post-season play. The teams with the best records hosted the first round of the playoffs, with the first-place team hosting the fourth-place team and the second-place team hosting the third-place team. The league did not have a divisional split. The second round of the playoffs was considered the CPIFL Championship game to crown the league champion each year.

== League history ==
In August 2012, Sioux City Bandits' managing partner, Bob Scott, generated the idea of a league that would be run by team owners, and not by a president. The idea came after the Bandits had spent two years in the American Professional Football League. The focus was to build the highest level of indoor football in the Midwest by adding teams to the league, linking "well-established teams currently coming from Iowa, Missouri and Kansas." The CPIFL brought together the top indoor football teams in the Midwest from existing leagues such as the Arena Football League, Indoor Football League, and the American Professional Football League to fill the new league. The CPIFL is bringing back rivalries from the past. Tulsa (Oklahoma Defenders) vs. Wichita (Wild), Lincoln (Haymakers) vs. Omaha (Beef), Lincoln vs. Sioux City (Bandits) and Omaha vs. Sioux City are a few examples. The league gained its first member on August 11, 2012, when the Bandits officially announced their intentions to join the CPIFL. Also on August 11, the league voted that James Bain would be the league's first Commissioner.

On August 14, 2014, it was announced on the league website that they had merged with the Lone Star Football League to create what they claimed to be the largest indoor football league in the country.

== Teams ==
Map of teams that competed in the CPIFL in 2013

Team	Location	Arena (Capacity)
Bloomington Edge	Bloomington, Illinois	U.S. Cellular Coliseum (7,000)
Dodge City Law	Dodge City, Kansas	United Wireless Arena (4,200)
Kansas Koyotes	Topeka, Kansas	Landon Arena (7,777)
Lincoln Haymakers	Lincoln, Nebraska	Pershing Center (4,526)
Oklahoma Defenders	Tulsa, Oklahoma	Tulsa Convention Center (8,900)
Omaha Beef	Ralston, Nebraska	Ralston Arena (4,020)
Salina Bombers	Salina, Kansas	Bicentennial Center (7,583)
Sioux City Bandits	Sioux City, Iowa	Tyson Events Center (7,500)
Wichita Wild	Park City, Kansas	Hartman Arena (5,000)

=== Former teams ===
- Mid-Missouri Outlaws – played 2013 season in CPIFL before leaving to join outdoor semi-pro Central Plains Football League.
- Kansas City Renegades – played 2013 season in CPIFL, then abruptly folded.

== CPIFL Champions Bowl results ==
Year	Winner	Loser	Score
2013	Wichita Wild	Salina Bombers	47–34
2014	Wichita Wild	Sioux City Bandits	46–41
