= San Angelo Bandits =

Logo

General information
- Founded: 2012
- Folded: 2016
- Headquartered: San Angelo, Texas at Foster Communications Coliseum
- Colors: Red, dark green, silver, white

Personnel
- Owner: Randy Sanders

Team history
- San Angelo Bandits (2013–2016)

Home fields
- Foster Communications Coliseum (2013–2016)

League / conference affiliations
- Lone Star Football League (2013–2014) Champions Indoor Football (2015–2016)

Championships
- League championships: 1 LSFL: 2014

Playoff appearances (1)
- LSFL: 2014

The San Angelo Bandits were a professional indoor football team based in San Angelo, Texas. They were members of Champions Indoor Football (CIF) and the Lone Star Football League (LSFL). The Bandits began play in 2013 as an expansion team in the LSFL. They became members of the CIF when the LSFL and Champions Professional Indoor Football League (CPIFL) merged at the conclusion of the 2014 season. The Bandits played their home games at the Foster Communications Coliseum. The team folded following the 2016 season and were replaced by the expansion CenTex Cavalry.

The Bandits were the second indoor football team to call San Angelo home, following the San Angelo Stampede Express which played in the Intense Football League in 2004 and again from 2006 until 2008, the National Indoor Football League in 2005, and the Indoor Football League from 2009 and 2010.

== History ==
After winning the 2014 regular season title, the Bandits clinched a playoff bye, but with the second-seeded Rio Grande Valley Sol suspended by the league, the Bandits played the third-seeded New Mexico Stars in the 2014 LSFL title game. The Bandits won the 2014 LSFL Championship Game by a score of 64-34.

== Season-by-season results ==
League champions	Conference champions	Division champions	Wild card berth	League leader

Season	Team	League	Conference	Division	Regular season				Postseason results
Season	Team	League	Conference	Division	Finish	Wins	Losses	Ties	Postseason results
2013	2013	LSFL			5th	1	11	0	
2014	2014	LSFL			1st	8	4	0	Won Lone Star Bowl III 64-34 (Stars)
2015	2015	CIF			8th	1	10	0	
2016	2016	CIF		Southern	5th	2	10	0	
Totals						12	35	0	All-time regular season record (2013–16)
Totals						1	0	—	All-time postseason record (2013–16)
Totals						13	35	0	All-time regular season and postseason record (2013–16)

== Head coaches ==
Name	Term	Regular season				Playoffs		Awards
Name	Term	W	L	T	Win%	W	L	Awards
Dixie Wooten	2013	1	11	0	.083	0	0	
Joe Brannen	2014	8	4	0	.667	1	0	
Joey Longoria	2015	0	5	0	.000	0	0	
Wendell Davis	2015	1	5	0	.167	0	0	
Meadow Lemon	2016	2	10	0	.167	0	0	

== Notable players ==
See Category:San Angelo Bandits players
