= New Mexico Chupacabras =

American indoor football team

- Current season
Logo

General information
- Founded: 2015
- Headquartered: Tingley Coliseum in Albuquerque, New Mexico
- Colors: Red, gold, white
- Website: abqfootball.com

Personnel
- Owners: Michael Fietz; Bob Pitre
- General manager: Corey Roberson
- Head coach: Corey Roberson

Team history
- Duke City Gladiators (2015–2025); New Mexico Chupcabras (2026–present)

Home fields
- Tingley Coliseum (2015–2019, 2026–present); Rio Rancho Events Center (2021–2024)

League / conference affiliations
- Champions Indoor Football (2015–2019): Southern Division (2016); South Conference (2017–2019); Indoor Football League (2020–present): Western Conference (2022–present)

Championships
- League championships: 2: 2018, 2019
- Conference championships: 2: 2018, 2019

Playoff appearances (5)
- 2017, 2018, 2019, 2021, 2022

The New Mexico Chupacabras are a professional indoor football team based in Albuquerque, New Mexico. They began play in March 2015 as the Duke City Gladiators and were members of the Champions Indoor Football (CIF) league. The Gladiators played at Tingley Coliseum in Albuquerque from 2015 to 2019, but began playing the 2021 season at Rio Rancho Events Center in nearby Rio Rancho due to availability during the COVID-19 pandemic. The team played the entire 2022 Indoor Football League season at Rio Rancho Events Center. After winning back-to-back CIF championships in 2018 and 2019, the Gladiators left the CIF for the Indoor Football League (IFL) in the 2020 season. They went dormant for the 2025 season, but returned for 2026 as the Chupacabras, returning to Albuquerque and the Tingley Coliseum.

== History ==
Original CIF Logo (2015-2019)

The team was formed in February 2015 by an ownership group called Duke City Sports Entertainment Group, Inc. a New Mexico corporation consisting of several investors, which also included Gladiators founder and general manager Matt Caward, along with co-founder and head coach Dominic Bramante, and director of media relations Andres Trujillo. The Gladiators joined Champions Indoor Football (CIF) in the league's inaugural season after the Rio Rancho-based New Mexico Stars cancelled their entry into the league shortly before the season began. (In April 2015, the Stars announced that they would instead join the North American Indoor Football for 2016.) The Gladiators had originally looked to join the X-League Indoor Football but geographical and financial considerations as well as the sudden availability of the CIF franchise slot led the team to change directions.

In 2015, the Gladiators played an abbreviated 11-game CIF schedule in 2015, as a direct replacement for the New Mexico Stars, but with some modifications and non-league games because of prior scheduling maneuvers and arena availability. The team opened training camp on March 15. Their first indoor practice session was March 24. Regular season promotions included Hispanic Heritage Night on March 28 and Public Service Day on April 26.

The Gladiators won the 2018 CIF championship. In February 2019, it was announced the Gladiators had been sold to Gina Prieskorn-Thomas, one of the former co-owners of the Gladiators. The team then won its second CIF championship. After the season, the CIF granted the Gladiators petition to be released them from their commitment to play the 2020 season. The team joined the Indoor Football League on August 20, 2019. Head coach Dominic Bramante, who had been with the team since its inaugural season, was not retained during the offseason after his contract had ended. The Gladiators then hired Pig Brown as head coach from the Nebraska Danger. The day they were to play their first IFL game on March 12, 2020, the league postponed all games due to venues instituting social distancing measures during the COVID-19 pandemic. The IFL eventually cancelled the entire season in April, but the Gladiators stated they would play exhibition games for their 2020 season once they were allowed to use the venues again. By May, plans for exhibition games were ended and the team split with head coach Pig Brown without ever coaching a game. Assistant coach Martino Theus was promoted to head coach in July 2020 while preparing for a 2021 season.

Gladiators' IFL Logo (2021-2025)

To start the 2021 season, the Gladiators had to move at least the first three home games to the nearby Rio Rancho Events Center in Rio Rancho as Tingley Coliseum was being used as a COVID-19 vaccination clinic. They subsequently would play the rest of the season in Rio Rancho. Head coach Martino Theus was replaced at the end of June 2021 after a 2–4 record by former Gladiator quarterback Robert Kent Jr.

On January 9, 2025, the Gladiators changed ownership with new owners Michael Fietz and Bob Pitre taking control of the team from previous owner Gina Prieskorn-Thomas effective immediately. On August 22, 2025, the team announced their rebrand as the New Mexico Chupacabras and their return to Albuquerque and the Tingley Coliseum.

== Season-by-season results ==
| League champions | Conference champions | Division champions | Playoff berth | League leader |

| Season | League | Conference | Division | Regular season | | | | Postseason results |
| Season | League | Conference | Division | Finish | Wins | Losses | Ties | Postseason results |
|---|---|---|---|---|---|---|---|---|
| 2015 | CIF | | | 5th | 7 | 4 | 0 | |
| 2016 | CIF | | Southern | 4th | 6 | 6 | 0 | |
| 2017 | CIF | South | | 4th | 7 | 5 | 0 | Lost Conference Semifinal (Amarillo) 41–70 |
| 2018 | CIF | South | | 1st | 10 | 2 | 0 | Won Conference Semifinal (Wichita) 44–39; Won Conference Championship (Texas) 41–28; Won Champions Bowl (Sioux City) 31–27 |
| 2019 | CIF | South | | 1st | 9 | 3 | 0 | Won Conference Championship (Amarillo) 70–62; Won Champions Bowl (Salina) 35–29 |
| 2020 | IFL | | | Season cancelled due to COVID-19 pandemic | | | | |
| 2021 | IFL | | | 4th | 7 | 7 | 0 | Won First round (Iowa) 34–33; Lost Semifinal (Arizona) 55–58 |
| 2022 | IFL | Western | | 4th | 8 | 8 | 0 | Lost First round (Arizona) 53–14 |
| 2023 | IFL | Western | | 6th | 5 | 10 | 0 | |
| 2024 | IFL | Western | | 7th | 3 | 13 | 0 | |
| 2025 | Dormant year | | | | | | | |
| 2026 | IFL | Western | | 7th | 2 | 14 | 0 | |
| Totals (2015–2026) | | | | | 64 | 72 | 0 | All-time regular season record (through 2026) |
| Totals (2015–2026) | | | | | 6 | 3 | — | All-time postseason record (through 2026) |
| Totals (2015–2026) | | | | | 70 | 75 | 0 | All-time combined record (through 2026) |

== Notable players ==
See Category:Duke City Gladiators players
