= New Mexico Stars =

Logo

General information
- Founded: 2012
- Folded: 2016
- Headquartered: Rio Rancho, New Mexico at Santa Ana Star Center
- Colors: Black, red, gold, white
- NMStarsIF.com

Personnel
- Owners: Dart Clark (2011–2012); Jerry Dunn (2012); Chris Williams (2013); Paul Parsons, Samuel Rodriguez & Ernie Guill (2014); Tracy & Crystal Duran (2015–2016)

Team history
- New Mexico Stars (2012–2014, 2016)

Home fields
- Santa Ana Star Center (2012–2014, 2016)

League / conference affiliations
- Indoor Football League (2012) * Intense (2012); Lone Star Football League (2013–2014); American Indoor Football (2016) * Western/Southern (2016)

Championships
- Division championships: 1 AIF Western: 2016 (by default)

Playoff appearances (3)
- LSFL: 2013, 2014; AIF: 2016

The New Mexico Stars were a professional indoor football team based in Rio Rancho, New Mexico. The Stars played their home games at the Santa Ana Star Center.

They began play in the Indoor Football League (IFL) during the 2012 season as an expansion team. The Stars left the IFL after one season and joined the Texas-based Lone Star Football League (LSFL) where they would play for two seasons. Prior to the 2015 season, the Stars were purchased by Tracy and Crystal Duran and the team announced it was going to play in Champions Indoor Football for 2015. However, the team would instead go on hiatus for the season. The Stars then attempted to join other indoor football leagues until playing the 2016 season as a member of American Indoor Football (AIF) as part of a West Division. Most of the West Division collapsed leaving the Stars regionally isolated and forced to schedule games against many local semi-professional teams. The AIF ceased operations following the 2016 season, leaving the Stars without a league. The Durans would move to Mississippi later in 2016 and the Stars would officially fold.

The Stars were the second indoor team to play in Rio Rancho, following the American Indoor Football Association's New Mexico Wildcats, which played the 2008 and 2009 seasons before folding.

== Franchise history ==
=== 2012 ===
In October 2011, team owner and general manager Dart Clark made an announcement that indoor football would be returning to New Mexico. During the announcement, Clark stated that the team would be nicknamed the Stars, the head coach would be Chris Williams and that the team would play at the Santa Ana Star Center. The team tried to make a large splash early on to help boost interest in the team when they offered NFL veteran wide receiver, Terrell Owens, former University of New Mexico star, DonTrell Moore and former University of Wisconsin–Madison All-American, Erasmus James. Owens would eventually sign with the Allen Wranglers (also of the IFL). The Stars played their first game on February 25, 2012 against the Colorado Ice. The Stars won the game 46-39 in front of a home crowd of around 3,600. The team was run by Clark until March 2012, when the Stars made a change, naming Jerry Dunn majority owner and interim general manager. After the teams April 20 game at the Wyoming Cavalry, two Stars players, (one of which was Darius Marshall) were arrested and charged with assault on a member of the Cavalry. The following week, the four players involved in the altercation were released. The Stars ended the 2012 season with a 2-12 record, a last place finish in the Intense Conference.

=== 2013 ===
In 2013, the Stars would play in the Lone Star Football League. In October 2012, Dunn sold the ownership of his team to head coach, Chris Williams. Williams purchased 51% of the team's ownership, while the LSFL owned the remaining 49%. Along with the Abilene Bombers, the Stars finished the season with a 6–7 record.

=== 2014 ===
Williams left the Stars after the 2013 season to take the head coaching job with the Texas Revolution. On August 16, 2013, the Stars ownership moved into an LLC. known as "Texas 3", which consists of Paul Parsons, Samuel Rodriguez & Ernie Guill. The Stars finished the regular season 7-5, good enough to earn the 3rd seed in the league and advance to a semi-final match up against the Rio Grande Valley Sol, with a berth in the 2014 LSFL Championship Game on the line. However, due to the Sol failing to meet league obligations and deadlines, they were suspended from the league and the Stars advanced into the Championship Game against the San Angelo Bandits. The Stars fell 64-34 to the Bandits.

=== 2015 ===
The New Mexico Stars were purchased by Tracy Duran, operating under TNC Duran LLC, Tracy Duran and Crystal Duran are the members. The team joined Champions Indoor Football (CIF) for the 2015 season, but before ever playing a game in the CIF, the team planned to regroup and resume play in 2016. Financial difficulties with the new league and other issues have complicated the team's plans for 2015.

=== 2016 ===
On June 16, 2015, the Stars announced that they would be returning to football in 2016, playing the X-League Indoor Football. The team also announced that Carlos Cavanaugh was named the teams' new head coach. However, on October 1, 2015, the X-League folded, and the Stars joined American Indoor Football.

The Stars first game was a victory over the Steel City Menace. It was the first game for both teams in the Western Division of the American Indoor Football league (AIF). The Stars then lost to the third West Division team, the Corpus Christi Fury, 59–53 with the game decided on the final play. In April 2016, former New Orleans Saints quarterback John Fourcade became the interim head coach and will lead the team through the 2016 season. However, after the initial announcement of the formerly six-team West Division schedule, three teams either folded or switched leagues prior to the start of the season. This led the team to scheduling whichever teams they could, often playing local independent semi-professional teams scheduled just days before home games in order to still have games. The AIF ceased operations following the 2016 season, leaving the Stars without a league. Their website was taken down a few months later. In September 2016, team owners, Tracey and Crystal Duran, confirmed the team's demise and moved to Mississippi.

== Season-by-season results ==
League champions	Conference champions	Division champions	Wild card berth	League leader

Season	Team	League	Conference	Division	Regular season				Postseason results
Season	Team	League	Conference	Division	Finish	Wins	Losses	Ties	Postseason results
2012	2012	IFL	Intense		8th	2	12	0	
2013	2013	LSFL			4th	6	6	0	Lost Semi-Final 56-61 (Rattlesnakes)
2014	2014	LSFL			3rd	7	5	0	Lost Lone Star Bowl III 34-64 (San Angelo Bandits)
2016	2016	AIF		Western (Note: Last team remaining in the Western Division, competed in the Southern Division for playoffs as the fourth seed.)	1st	6	1	0	Lost Southern Semifinals (Lions) 37-49
Totals						21	24	0	All-time regular season record (2012–2016)
Totals						0	3	—	All-time postseason record (2012–2016)
Totals						21	27	0	All-time regular season and postseason record (2012–2016)

== Head coaches ==
Name	Term	Regular season				Playoffs		Awards
Name	Term	W	L	T	Win%	W	L	Awards
Chris Williams	2012–2013	8	18	0	.308	0	1	
Dominic Bramante	2014	7	5	0	.583	0	1	
Carlos Cavanaugh	2016	1	0	0	1.000	0	0	
John Fourcade	2016	5	1	0	.833	0	1	

== Notable players ==
See Category:New Mexico Stars players
