= 2014 Bloomington Edge season =

Indoor Football League team season

- Owner: David Holt
- Head coach: John Johnson
- Home stadium: U.S. Cellular Coliseum

Results
- Record: 5-7
- League place: 6th
- Playoffs: did not qualify

The 2014 Bloomington Edge season was the team's ninth overall, third as the Bloomington Edge and second as a member of the Champions Professional Indoor Football League (CPIFL). One of nine teams in the CPIFL for the 2014 season, the Edge finished the regular season with a 5-7 record, failing to qualify for the postseason.

== Schedule ==
Key: Win Loss Bye

=== Regular season ===
Week	Day	Date	Kickoff	Opponent	Results		Location	Attendance
Week	Day	Date	Kickoff	Opponent	Score	Record	Location	Attendance
1	BYE							
2	Friday	March 7	7:05pm	at Salina Bombers	L 20–56	0–1	Bicentennial Center	
3	Friday	March 14	7:05pm	at Lincoln Haymakers	L 50–54	0–2	Pershing Center	
4	BYE							
5	Saturday	March 29	7:05pm	Omaha Beef	L 69–70	0–3	U.S. Cellular Coliseum	2,247
6	Saturday	April 5	7:05pm	Dodge City Law	L 47–57	0–4	U.S. Cellular Coliseum	
7	Saturday	April 12	7:05pm	at Oklahoma Defenders	W 59–58	1–4	Tulsa Convention Center	
8	Saturday	April 19	7:30pm	Sioux City Bandits	W 52–43	2–4	U.S. Cellular Coliseum	1,383
9	Saturday	April 26	7:30pm	at Lincolnn Haymakers	L 27–58	2–5	Pershing Center	
10	Saturday	May 3	7:05pm	Kansas Koyotes	W 43–42	3–5	U.S. Cellular Coliseum	1,452
11	Saturday	May 10	7:05pm	Salina Bombers	W 58–50	4–5	U.S. Cellular Coliseum	1,252
12	Saturday	May 17	7:05pm	at Sioux City Bandits	L 39–63	4–6	Tyson Events Center	3,965
13	Saturday	May 24	7:05pm	at Omaha Beef	L 46–6	4–7	Ralston Arena	3,029
14	Saturday	May 31	7:05pm	Lincoln Haymakers	W 53–36	5–7	U.S. Cellular Coliseum	

== Roster ==
2014 Bloomington Edge roster
Quarterbacks: 15 Andre Brown; 2 Charles Dowdell; Running backs: 11 Darrelynn Dunn; 12 Michael Hayden; 23 Andre Raymond; Wide receivers: -- David Brown; 10 De'Andre Eagle; -- Glenn Johnson; 3 LaVaughn Macon; -- Frank Wolfe	Offensive linemen: 52 Josh Coyle; 55 Jamarkus Gorman; 72 Ray Krishock; 69 Jason Townson; Defensive linemen: 77 Marvin Campbell; -- Romaine Green; 96 Quince Holman; 91 Ryan Jenkins; -- Brandon McCaulley; 97 Cedric Young	Linebackers: -- Sam Fornelli; Defensive backs: 32 Cody Acree; 4 Eric Fisher; --- Ashton Hardy; 24 Tommie Williams; -- Eddy Umeh; 13 Caleb Young; Special teams: 19 David Tomis	Injured Reserve: 1 Ross Cochran LB (IR); 8 Marcus Lewis WR (IR); Transfer List: Currently vacant; Refuse to Report: 10 Brandon Newbern WR (DNR); Roster updated May 22, 2014; Transactions; 28 Active, 3 Inactive
