= 2017 Omaha Beef season =

- Owner: Rich Tokheim; Jim Tokheim
- Head coach: Cory Ross
- Home stadium: Ralston Arena; 7300 Q Street; Ralston, Nebraska 68127

Results
- Record: 9–6
- Conference place: 2nd
- Playoffs: Won North Semifinal 43–30 (Edge); Won North Championship 55–45 (Bandits); Lost Champions Bowl III 49–56 (Revolution)

The 2017 Omaha Beef season was the team's eighteenth and third as a member of Champions Indoor Football (CIF). One of 14 teams in the CIF for the 2017 season, they played in the 7-team North Conference.

The Beef played their home games at the Ralston Arena in Ralston, Nebraska, under the direction of head coach Cory Ross.

== Schedule ==
Key: Win Loss Bye

=== Regular season ===
Week	Day	Date	Kickoff	Opponent	Results		Location	Attendance
Week	Day	Date	Kickoff	Opponent	Score	Record	Location	Attendance
1	Saturday	February 25	7:05pm	at Sioux City Bandits	L 44–63	0–1	Tyson Events Center	3,381
2	BYE							
3	Friday	March 10	7:05pm	Salina Liberty	W 76-44	1–1	Ralston Arena	3,626
4	Saturday	March 17	7:05pm	at Bloomington Edge	W 55–50	2–1	The Coliseum	1,000
5	BYE							
6	Friday	March 31	7:05pm	Sioux City Bandits	L 53–56	2–2	Ralston Arena	3,810
7	BYE							
8	Saturday	April 165	6:35pm	West Michigan Ironmen	W 30–28	3–2	Ralston Arena	
9	Friday	April 21	7:05pm	at Bismarck Bucks	L 41-59	3–3	Bismarck Event Center	
10	Saturday	April 29	7:05pm	at Salina Liberty	W 26–23	4–3	Tony’s Pizza Events Center	
11	Saturday	May 6	7:05pm	Kansas City Phantoms	W 37–29	5–3	Ralston Arena	
12	Saturday	May 13	7:05pm	at West Michigan Ironmen	W 44–41	6–3	L. C. Walker Arena	
13	Saturday	May 20	7:05pm	West Michigan Ironmen	W 42–39	7–3	Ralston Arena	3,296
14	Saturday	May 27	7:05pm	Sioux City Bandits	L 55–61	7–4	Ralston Arena	3,277
15	Saturday	June 3	7:05pm	at Dallas Marshals	L 55–62	7–5	Mesquite Arena	2,500

== Standings ==
North Conference
	W	L	PCT	PF	PA
x–Sioux City Bandits	9	3	.750	704	599
y–Omaha Beef	7	5	.583	561	562
y–Bloomington Edge	7	5	.583	598	560
y–Bismarck Bucks	5	7	.417	540	569
Kansas City Phantoms	4	8	.333	499	594
West Michigan Ironmen	4	8	.333	569	570
Salina Liberty	1	11	.083	403	546
South Conference
	W	L	PCT	PF	PA
z–Amarillo Venom	9	3	.750	758	639
y-Texas Revolution	8	4	.667	716	584
y-Dodge City Law (Note: On June 2, the CIF penalized Dodge City by removing two of their wins when the team was 9–2, reducing their record to 7–4.)	7	5	.583	631	575
y-Duke City Gladiators	7	5	.583	663	513
Wichita Force	7	5	.583	567	481
Dallas Marshals	7	5	.583	500	512
CenTex Cavalry	0	12	.000	412	811

z - clinched top overall seed

x - clinched division title

y - clinched playoff berth

=== Postseason ===
Round	Day	Date	Kickoff	Opponent	Results		Location	Attendance
Round	Day	Date	Kickoff	Opponent	Score	Record	Location	Attendance
North Semifinal	Saturday	June 10	7:00pm	Bloomington Edge	W 43–30	1–0	Ralston Arena	2,856
North Championship	Saturday	June 17	7:05pm	at Sioux City Bandits	W 55–45	2–0	Tyson Events Center	2,407
Champions Bowl III	Friday	June 23	7:05pm	at Texas Revolution	L 49-56	2–1	Allen Event Center	5,251

== Roster ==
2017 Omaha Beef roster
Quarterbacks: 10 Anthony Iannotti; 7 Chuck Wright; Running backs: 20 Travis Ribbing; Wide receivers: 11 Andrew King; 1 Jonathan Ray; 0 Julius Record; 12 Skyler Scott	Offensive linemen: 50 Olu'kayode Akinmoladun; 90 Ryan Bubulka; -- Amadou Konte; 71 Aneus Ruiz; Defensive linemen: 9 Antonio Ficklin; 99 Cody Kottich; 55 J. T. Nabity; 15 Tarek Odom	Linebackers: 21 DeShawn Dinwiddle; 17 Deonate Gary; Defensive backs: 5 Antonio Bell; 6 D. J. Cameron; 23 Paul Dodson; 27 Brandon Green; 3 Chris Perry; 8 Paul Robinson; Special teams: 19 Benny Hanaphy	Reserve lists: -- Clark Coe DB (IR); -- Joshua Caver OL (DNR); 2 Calvin Phillips RB (IR); -- Pereese Jones RB (IR); -- Rufus Quinn OL (DNR); -- Theron Norman DB (DNR); 15 Reshard Simmons DL (Susp.); 3 Chris Perry DB (Exempt); Rookies in italics Roster updated June 2, 2017; 24 Active, 8 Inactive → More rosters
