= Champions Bowl III =

Omaha Beef	Texas Revolution
(9–6)	(11–4)
49	59
Head coach: Cory Ross	Head coach: Victor Mann
	1	2	3	4	Total
Omaha	7	14	0	28	49
Texas	13	26	6	14	59
- Date: June 23, 2017
- Stadium: Allen Event Center
- Location: Allen, Texas
- MVP: Clinton Solomon (TEX)
- Attendance: 5,251

United States TV coverage
- Network: Eversport

Champions Bowl III was the third title game of Champions Indoor Football (CIF). It was played on June 23, 2017, and won by the Texas Revolution.

== Road to the Champions Bowl ==
The four teams (ordered by seeding) that made the postseason in the North Conference were the Sioux City Bandits, Omaha Beef, Bloomington Edge, and Bismarck Bucks. In the South Conference, the playoff teams were the Amarillo Venom, Texas Revolution, Dodge City Law, and Duke City Gladiators. The Gladiators appeared in their first playoffs as a franchise, while the Beef made their first CIF playoff appearance. The Beef last played in the playoffs in 2013 while a member of the Champions Professional Indoor Football League. The Law had actually won nine games and would have finished second in the division but were issued two-win penalty by the league towards the end of the regular season for breaking league rules.

On Saturday, June 10, the Bandits and the Venom pulled easy wins over the Bucks and the Gladiators, winning 82–43 and 70–41 respectively. That same night, the Beef defeated the Edge 43–30, and the Law continued their playoff losing streak with a close 63–59 loss against the "Revs".

In the North Conference championship, the Beef upset the Bandits 55–45, thanks to a late touchdown with 11 seconds remaining in the game. Two days later, in the South Conference championship, the Revolution advanced to their second Champions Bowl with a 77–71 win over the Venom, their third win over the team in the 2017 season.

North Conference
	W	L	PCT	PF	PA
x–Sioux City Bandits	9	3	.750	704	599
y–Omaha Beef	7	5	.583	561	562
y–Bloomington Edge	7	5	.583	598	560
y–Bismarck Bucks	5	7	.417	540	569
Kansas City Phantoms	4	8	.333	499	594
West Michigan Ironmen	4	8	.333	569	570
Salina Liberty	1	11	.083	403	546
South Conference
	W	L	PCT	PF	PA
z–Amarillo Venom	9	3	.750	758	639
y-Texas Revolution	8	4	.667	716	584
y-Dodge City Law (Note: On June 2, the CIF penalized Dodge City by removing two of their wins when the team was 9–2, reducing their record to 7–4.)	7	5	.583	631	575
y-Duke City Gladiators	7	5	.583	663	513
Wichita Force	7	5	.583	567	481
Dallas Marshals	7	5	.583	500	512
CenTex Cavalry	0	12	.000	412	811

z - clinched top overall seed

x - clinched division title

y - clinched playoff berth

== Playoffs ==
Conference Semi-Finals
3	Bloomington	30
2	Omaha	43
North Conference
4	Bismarck	43
1	Sioux City	82
3	Dodge City	59
2	Texas	63
South Conference
4	Duke City	41
1	Amarillo	70

Conference Championships
2	Omaha	55
1	Sioux City	45
2	Texas	77
1	Amarillo	71

Champions Bowl III
N2	Omaha	49
S2	Texas	59

=== Matchups ===
Date & Time (CDT)	Away team	Result	Home team	Arena
First Round
Saturday, June 10, 2017, 7:00 PM	Duke City Gladiators	41–70	Amarillo Venom	Amarillo Civic Center
Saturday, June 10, 2017, 7:00 PM	Bismarck Bucks	43–82	Sioux City Bandits	Tyson Events Center
Saturday, June 10, 2017, 7:00 PM	Dodge City Law	59–63	Texas Revolution	Allen Event Center
Saturday, June 10, 2017, 7:00 PM	Bloomington Edge	30–43	Omaha Beef	Ralston Arena
Conference Championships
Saturday, June 17, 2017, 7:00 PM	Omaha Beef	55–45	Sioux City Bandits	Tyson Events Center
Monday, June 19, 2017, 7:00 PM	Texas Revolution	77–71	Amarillo Venom	Amarillo Civic Center
Champions Bowl III
Friday, June 23, 2017, 7:00 PM	Omaha Beef	49–59	Texas Revolution	Allen Event Center

=== Scoring Summary ===
Scoring summary

Quarter	Time	Drive			Team	Scoring information	Score	
Quarter	Time	Plays	Yards	TOP	Team	Scoring information	Omaha Beef	Texas Revolution
1	12:22	4	38	2:29	Texas Revolution	Clinton Solomon 37-yard touchdown reception from Chris Dixon, Adam Peden kick Failed	0	6
1	6:58	5	45	2:23	Texas Revolution	Chris Dixon 17-yard touchdown run, Adam Peden kick Good	0	13
1	0:14	10	43	6:37	Omaha Beef	Jonathan Ray 1-yard touchdown run, Tucker Milliken kick Good	7	13
2	13:22	3	15	1:38	Texas Revolution	Clinton Solomon 14-yard touchdown reception from Chris Dixon, Adam Peden kick Failed	7	19
2	7:20	6	45	4:02	Texas Revolution	Chris Dixon 11-yard touchdown run, Adam Peden kick Failed	7	25
2	4:12	5	17	2:57	Omaha Beef	Travis Ribbing 2-yard touchdown run, Tucker Milliken kick Good	14	25
2	1:41	4	41	2:21	Texas Revolution	Brett Reece Jr. 2-yard touchdown reception from Chris Dixon, 2-point pass by Chris Dixon Succeeded	14	33
2	0:46	4	39	0:45	Omaha Beef	Travis Ribbing 7-yard touchdown run, Tucker Milliken kick Good	21	33
2	0:14	3	8	0:19	Texas Revolution	Clinton Solomon 15-yard touchdown reception from Chris Dixon, 2-point rush by Darius Fudge Failed	21	39
3	7:49	5	42	4:04	Texas Revolution	Michael Dyer 8-yard touchdown reception from Chris Dixon, 2-point team 2 point pass from Chris Dixon Failed	21	45
4	14:59	9	28	6:25	Texas Revolution	Michael Dyer 1-yard touchdown run, Adam Peden kick Good	21	52
4	12:58	3	27	1:50	Omaha Beef	Skyler Scott 22-yard touchdown reception from Anthony Iannott, 2-point 2 point rush by Jonathan Ray succeeded	29	52
4	12:32	1	35	0:18	Texas Revolution	Darius Fudge 35-yard touchdown reception from Chris Dixon, Adam Peden kick Good	29	59
4	9:21	6	33	3:03	Omaha Beef	Skyler Scott 3-yard touchdown run, 2-point pass by Anthony Iannott failed	35	59
4	1:23	9	44	4:22	Omaha Beef	Travis Ribbing 1-yard touchdown run, 2-point rush by Anthony Iannott failed	43	59
4	0:00	5	37	0:38	Omaha Beef	Anthony Iannott 8-yard touchdown run, 2-point {{{2pt type}}} {{{2pt result}}}	49	59
"TOP" = time of possession. For other American football terms, see Glossary of American football.							Omaha Beef	Texas Revolution

|Reference=https://cif.prestosports.com/sports/fball/2016-17/boxscores/20170623_qtsm.xml?view=drives
