= 2012 Green Bay Blizzard season =

Indoor Football League team season

- Owner: Titletown Football Group, LLC; Ahman Green
- Head coach: Robert Fuller
- Home stadium: Resch Center

Results
- Record: 11-3
- Division place: United Conference
- Conference place: 2nd
- Playoffs: Won Conference Semi-Finals (Edge) 51-30; Lost United Conference Championship (Storm) 42-61

The 2012 Green Bay Blizzard season was the team's tenth season as a football franchise and third in the Indoor Football League. One of just nine teams competing in the IFL for the 2012 season, the Green Bay Blizzard were members of the United Conference.The team played their home games at the Resch Center in the Green Bay suburb of Ashwaubenon, Wisconsin.

== Schedule ==
Key: Win Tie Loss Bye

| Week | Date | Kickoff | Opponent | Results | | Attendance |
| Week | Date | Kickoff | Opponent | Final Score | Team record | |
|---|---|---|---|---|---|---|
| 1 | Bye | | | | | |
| 2 | February 26 (Sun) | 2:05pm | @Sioux Falls Storm | L 43-73 | 0-1 | NA |
| 3 | March 2 (Fri) | 7:00pm (6:00 Central) | @Reading Express | W 55-32 | 1-1 | NA |
| 4 | March 9 (Fri) | 7:30pm | Cedar Rapids Titans | W 64-12 | 2-1 | NA |
| 5 | Bye | | | | | |
| 6 | March 24 (Sat) | 7:05pm | @Omaha Beef | W 42-37 | 3-1 | NA |
| 7 | Bye | | | | | |
| 8 | April 7 (Sat) | 7:05pm | @Cedar Rapids Titans | W 58-46 | 4-1 | NA |
| 9 | April 13 (Fri) | 7:30pm | Chicago Slaughter | W 63-36 | 5-1 | 5,346 |
| 10 | April 21 (Sat) | 7:05pm | @Chicago Slaughter | L 42-45 | 5-2 | 5,024 |
| 11 | April 28 (Sat) | 7:00pm | Bloomington Edge | W 69-56 | 6-2 | 4,270 |
| 12 | May 5 (Sat) | 7:05pm | @Bloomington Edge | W 34-21 | 7-2 | NA |
| 13 | May 11 (Fri) | 7:30pm | Lehigh Valley Steelhawks | W 76-61 | 8-2 | 3,037 |
| 14 | May 19 (Sat) | 7:00pm | Sioux Falls Storm | L 39-66 | 8-3 | 3,886 |
| 15 | Bye | | | | | |
| 16 | June 2 (Sat) | 7:00pm (6:00 Central) | @Lehigh Valley Steelhawks | W 41-33 | 9-3 | NA |
| 17 | June 8 (Fri) | 7:30pm | Reading Express | W 89-27 | 10-3 | 2,532 |
| 18 | June 16 (Sat) | 7:30pm | Wichita Wild | W 72-41 | 11-3 | 3,037 |
Playoffs
| 1 | June 23 (Sat) | 7:00pm | Bloomington Edge | W 51-30 | --- | NA |
| 2 | June 30 (Sat) | 7:05pm | @Sioux Falls Storm | L 42-61 | --- | NA |

== Roster ==
2012 Green Bay Blizzard roster
| Quarterbacks: 16 Adam Neugebauer; 15 Donovan Porterie; Running backs: 6 LaRon Council; 34 Andrew Verboncouer; Wide receivers: 8 Scott Burnoski; 12 John Halman; 9 Bryan Pray; 13 Daryl Robinson; 7 Desmond Tardy; 18 Marquel Willis | Offensive linemen: 69 Leroy Auguste; 55 Shannon Breen; 50 Seth Smalls; 77 Nicholas Thornton-Jack; Defensive linemen: 99 Junior Aumavae; 97 Tim Hume; 92 Tyron Hurst; 98 James McClinton; 17 P. J. South | Linebackers: 11 Greg Jackson; 94 Jordan Lardinois; Defensive backs: 3 B. J. Hill; 4 Kyle Longsdorf; 2 Aaron Moore; 5 James Romain; 14 Curtis Thomas; Kicker: 19 Adrian Trevino | Injured Reserve: currently vacant; Exempt List: currently vacant; Practice squad: currently vacant; rookies in italics Roster updated June 25, 2012; 27 Active, 0 Inactive, 0 PS → More rosters |

== Standings ==
2012 United Conference
| | W | L | T | PCT | PF | PA | DIV | GB | STK |
|---|---|---|---|---|---|---|---|---|---|
| y Sioux Falls Storm | 14 | 0 | 0 | 1.000 | 941 | 563 | 7-0 | --- | W14 |
| x Green Bay Blizzard | 11 | 3 | 0 | 0.786 | 787 | 586 | 10-3 | 3.0 | W3 |
| x Bloomington Edge | 10 | 4 | 0 | 0.714 | 673 | 604 | 10-3 | 4.0 | W1 |
| x Lehigh Valley Steelhawks | 6 | 8 | 0 | 0.429 | 605 | 615 | 6-8 | 8.0 | W1 |
| Omaha Beef | 6 | 8 | 0 | 0.429 | 635 | 696 | 3-3 | 4.0 | L2 |
| Chicago Slaughter | 6 | 8 | 0 | 0.429 | 657 | 714 | 6-8 | 4.0 | L1 |
| Cedar Rapids Titans | 4 | 10 | 0 | 0.286 | 509 | 631 | 4-10 | 10.0 | W1 |
| Reading Express | 2 | 12 | 0 | 0.143 | 534 | 773 | 2-12 | 12.0 | L5 |
