= 2013 Sioux City Bandits season =

- Owner: Bob Scott
- General manager: Bob Scott
- Head coach: Erv Strohbeen
- Home stadium: Tyson Events Center; 401 Gordon Drive; Sioux City, Iowa 51101

Results
- Record: 10-2
- League place: 1st
- Playoffs: Lost semi-final (Bombers) 29-26

The 2013 Sioux City Bandits season was the team's fourteenth overall, thirteenth as the Sioux City Bandits and first as a member of the Champions Professional Indoor Football League (CPIFL). One of ten teams in the CPIFL for the inaugural 2013 season, the Bandits finished the regular season with a 10-2 record to earn the number one seed in the playoffs, in which they lost on a missed last-second field goal to the Salina Bombers, 29-28 in the semifinals.

== Schedule ==
Key: Win Loss Bye

=== Regular season ===
Week	Day	Date	Kickoff	Opponent	Results		Location	Attendance
Week	Day	Date	Kickoff	Opponent	Score	Record	Location	Attendance
1	BYE							
2	Friday	March 15	7:05pm	at Bloomington Edge	W 65–56	1–0	U.S. Cellular Coliseum	3,106
3	Friday	March 15	7:05pm	Kansas City Renegades	W 38–26	2–0	Tyson Events Center	4,269
4	Friday	March 29	7:05pm	at Lincoln Haymakers	W 42–20	3–0	Pershing Center	2,163
5	Sunday	April 7	7:05pm	at Omaha Beef	L 26–32	3–1	Ralston Arena	2,245
6	Friday	April 12	7:05pm	at Salina Bombers	W 46–43	4–1	Bicentennial Center	3,362
7	BYE							
8	Saturday	April 27	7:05pm	Omaha Beef	L 24–38	4–2	Tyson Events Center	4,887
9	Friday	May 4	7:05pm	at Kansas City Renegades	W 51–42	5–2	Kemper Arena	
10	Saturday	May 11	7:05pm	Mid-Missouri Outlaws	W 56–6	6–2	Tyson Events Center	
11	Saturday	May 18	7:05pm	Lincoln Haymakers	W 24–17	7–2	Tyson Events Center	3,443
12	Saturday	May 25	7:05pm	Wichita Wild	W 46–21	8–2	Tyson Events Center	3,913
13	Saturday	June 1	7:05pm	at Kansas Koyotes	W 55–8	9–2	Landon Arena	
14	Saturday	June 8	7:05pm	Bloomington Edge	W 48–36	10–2	Tyson Events Center	4,999

=== Post-season ===
Round	Day	Date	Kickoff	Opponent	Results		Location	Attendance
Round	Day	Date	Kickoff	Opponent	Score	Record	Location	Attendance
Semi-finals	Saturday	June 15	7:05pm	Salina Bombers	L 26–29	0–1	Tyson Events Center	3,415

== Roster ==
2013 Sioux City Bandits roster
Quarterbacks: 5 Scott Jensen; 14 Lehi Tonga; Running backs: 12 Johnny Bentley; 20 Drew Prohaska; 1 Sean Treasure; Wide receivers: 82 Chase Colvin; 4 Trae Johnson III; 33 Andre London; 15 Marlon Lucky; 10 Damon Mothershead	Offensive linemen: 68 Kyle McManus; 73 Brian Okonofua; 64 Steve Schmidt; Defensive linemen: 18 Jason Bonwell; 94 Jordan Carlson; 96 Darius Davis; 7 Sean Kelly; 75 Anthony Thomas; 45 Thomas Wells	Linebackers: 42 Marshall Barney; 55 Marlon Lobban; 51 Spetlar Tonga; Defensive backs: 9 Denzel Adams; 2 Pompey Festejo; 3 Rahn Franklin; 40 Paul Robinson; 23 Jonathan Smith; Kickers: 47 Nick Hope; 80 Max Martin	Injured Reserve: currently vacant; Exempt List: currently vacant; Practice squad: currently vacant; rookies in italics Roster updated July 10, 2013; 29 Active, 0 Inactive, 0 PS
