= 2013 Bloomington Edge season =

Indoor Football League team season

- Owner: Sandra Hunnewell
- Head coach: Kenton Carr
- Home stadium: U.S. Cellular Coliseum

Results
- Record: 5-7
- League place: 6th
- Playoffs: did not qualify

The 2013 Bloomington Edge season was the team's seventh overall, second as the Bloomington Edge and first as a member of the Champions Professional Indoor Football League (CPIFL). One of ten teams in the CPIFL for the inaugural 2013 season, the Edge finished the regular season with a 5-7 record, failing to qualify for the postseason.

== Schedule ==
Key: Win Loss Bye

=== Regular season ===
Week	Day	Date	Kickoff	Opponent	Results		Location	Attendance
Week	Day	Date	Kickoff	Opponent	Score	Record	Location	Attendance
1	BYE							
2	Friday	March 15	7:05pm	Sioux City Bandits	L 56–65	0–1	U.S. Cellular Coliseum	3,106
3	Friday	March 22	7:05pm	Mid-Missouri Outlaws	W 54–3	1–1	U.S. Cellular Coliseum	2,139
4	Saturday	March 30	7:05pm	at Wichita Wild	L 22–54	1–2	Hartman Arena	2,467
5	Friday	April 5	7:05pm	Lincoln Haymakers	W 62–40	2–2	U.S. Cellular Coliseum	1,831
6	Friday	April 12	7:05pm	Wichita Wild	L 35–49	2–3	U.S. Cellular Coliseum	2,319
7	Saturday	April 20	7:30pm	at Oklahoma Defenders	W 44–39	3–3	Tulsa Convention Center	
8	Saturday	April 27	7:30pm	at Kansas Koyotes	W 48–0	4–3	Landon Arena	
9	Friday	May 3	7:05pm	at Lincoln Haymakers	L 39–48	4–4	Pershing Center	1,431
10	Friday	May 10	7:05pm	Kansas City Renegades	L 44–47	4–5	U.S. Cellular Coliseum	2,269
11	Friday	May 17	7:05pm	Omaha Beef	L 33–51	4–6	U.S. Cellular Coliseum	2,412
12	Saturday	May 25	7:05pm	at Mid-Missouri Outlaws	W 46–6	5–6	Mathewson Exhibition Center	
13	BYE							
14	Saturday	June 8	7:05pm	at Sioux City Bandits	L 36–48	5–7	Tyson Events Center	4,999

== Roster ==
2013 Bloomington Edge roster
Quarterbacks: 10 Andre Brown; 12 Jim DuPage; Running backs: -- Mitchell Moore; 23 Andre Raymond; Wide receivers: 24 Lee Banks; -- Daron Clark; -- Rob Garcia; -- Marcus Lewis; 3 LaVaughn Macon; -- Wes Schmidgall	Offensive linemen: 77 Josh Coyle; -- Jamarkus Gorman; -- Ray Krishock; Defensive linemen: -- Shonn Bell; -- Marvin Campbell; 40 Antonio Ficklin; -- Ryan Jenkins; -- Calvin Jones	Linebackers: -- Ross Cochran; -- Sam Fornelli; -- Eric Tapley; Defensive backs: -- Eric Fisher; -- Josh Morris; -- Josh Walker; -- Caleb Young; Kickers: 22 Peter Christofilakos	Injured Reserve: currently vacant; Exempt List: currently vacant; Practice squad: currently vacant; rookies in italics Roster updated July 10, 2013; 26 Active, 0 Inactive, 0 PS
