= 2017 Sioux City Bandits season =

- Owner: Bob Scott
- General manager: Bob Scott
- Head coach: Erv Strohbeen
- Home stadium: Tyson Events Center; 401 Gordon Drive; Sioux City, Iowa 51101

Results
- Record: 9–3
- Conference place: 1st
- League place: 2nd
- Playoffs: Won Quarter-Finals (Bismarck) 82–43; Lost North Conference Championship (Omaha) 55–45

The 2017 Sioux City Bandits season is the team's seventeenth as the Sioux City Bandits, eighteenth overall and third as a member of Champions Indoor Football (CIF). One of 14 teams in the CIF for the 2017 season, they play in the 7-team North Conference.

The Bandits play their home games at the Tyson Events Center in Sioux City, Iowa, under the direction of head coach Erv Strohbeen. The team's offensive coordinator is Jarrod DeGeorgia, the defensive coordinator is John Zevenbergen, and the assistant coaches include Dave Croston and Paul Dacres.

== Awards and honors ==
Each week of the regular season, the CIF names league-wide Players of the Week in offensive, defensive, and special teams categories.

- For Week 1, the CIF named defensive lineman Devon Bridges as the Defensive Player of the Week, and kick returner Dominique Carson as the Special Teams Player of the Week.
- For Week 2, the CIF named running back Frederick Bruno as the Offensive Player of the Week, scoring five touchdowns and rushing for 93 yards on ten carries and also caught three passes for 31 yards.
- In Week 5, the CIF honored defensive back Cliff Stokes as the Defensive Player of the Week, as he recorded six tackles and intercepted three passes (scoring on one interception), to accompany his 71 interception-return yards.
- For Week 6, the CIF brought kicker Greg Conry into the spotlight as the Special Teams Player of the Week, as he scored 21 of the team's 63 points, pushing the Bandits past Omaha, 63–56. Conry was 6/6 on extra point attempts, and went 5/6 on field goal kicking. He nailed kicks from 29, 32, 35, 40, and 49 yards. His only Miss came from 46 yards away.
- In Week 7, the CIF named defensive lineman Devon Bridges as the Defensive Player of the Week for his second time of the season. He made eight tackles, had three tackles-for-loss, including 1.5 sacks.
- During Week 13, Bandits kicker Greg Conry became the Special Team's Player of the Week for the second week, scoring 17 total points, as he was perfect for both field goals (3/3) and extra points (8/8).

== Standings ==
North Conference
	W	L	PCT	PF	PA
x–Sioux City Bandits	9	3	.750	704	599
y–Omaha Beef	7	5	.583	561	562
y–Bloomington Edge	7	5	.583	598	560
y–Bismarck Bucks	5	7	.417	540	569
Kansas City Phantoms	4	8	.333	499	594
West Michigan Ironmen	4	8	.333	569	570
Salina Liberty	1	11	.083	403	546
South Conference
	W	L	PCT	PF	PA
z–Amarillo Venom	9	3	.750	758	639
y-Texas Revolution	8	4	.667	716	584
y-Dodge City Law (Note: On June 2, the CIF penalized Dodge City by removing two of their wins when the team was 9–2, reducing their record to 7–4.)	7	5	.583	631	575
y-Duke City Gladiators	7	5	.583	663	513
Wichita Force	7	5	.583	567	481
Dallas Marshals	7	5	.583	500	512
CenTex Cavalry	0	12	.000	412	811

z - clinched top overall seed

x - clinched division title

y - clinched playoff berth

== Schedule ==
Key:

Win

Loss

Bye

=== Preseason ===
Week	Day	Date	Kickoff	Opponent	Results		Location	Attendance
Week	Day	Date	Kickoff	Opponent	Score	Record	Location	Attendance
1	Saturday	February 18	7:05pm	First City Cavalry	W 80–0	0–0	Tyson Events Center	N/A

=== Regular season ===
Week	Day	Date	Kickoff	Opponent	Results		Location	Attendance
Week	Day	Date	Kickoff	Opponent	Score	Record	Location	Attendance
1	Saturday	February 25	7:05pm	Omaha Beef	W 63–44	1–0	Tyson Events Center	3,381
2	Saturday	March 4	7:05pm	Bismarck Bucks	W 77–37	2–0	Tyson Events Center	2,720
3	BYE							
4	Friday	March 17	7:05pm	at Bismarck Bucks	W 30–16	3–0	Bismarck Event Center	N/A
5	Saturday	March 25	7:05pm	Kansas City Phantoms	W 62–35	4–0	Tyson Events Center	3,436
6	Friday	March 31	7:05pm	at Omaha Beef	W 63–56	5–0	Ralston Arena	3,810
7	BYE							
8	Saturday	April 15	7:05pm	Bloomington Edge	W 62–56	6–0	Tyson Events Center	3,060
9	Saturday	April 22	7:05pm	at West Michigan Ironmen	L 35–76	6–1	L.C. Walker Arena	N/A
10	Saturday	April 29	7:05pm	West Michigan Ironmen	W 53–37	7–1	Tyson Events Center	4,787
11	Saturday	May 6	7:05pm	at Bismarck Bucks	L 61–63	7–2	Bismarck Event Center	N/A
12	BYE							
13	Saturday	May 20	7:05pm	Bismarck Bucks	W 67–49	8–2	Tyson Events Center	4,529
14	Saturday	May 27	7:05pm	at Omaha Beef	W 61–55	9–2	Ralston Arena	3,277
15	Friday	June 2	7:05pm	at Kansas City Phantoms	L 70–75	9–3	Silverstein Eye Centers Arena	N/A

=== Post-season ===
Round	Day	Date	Kickoff	Opponent	Results		Location	Attendance
Round	Day	Date	Kickoff	Opponent	Score	Record	Location	Attendance
First Round	Saturday	June 10	7:05pm	Bismarck Bucks	W 82–43	1–0	Tyson Events Center	1,753
Conference Championship	Saturday	June 17	7:05pm	Omaha Beef	L 45–55	1–1	Tyson Events Center	2,407

== Roster ==
2017 Sioux City Bandits roster
Quarterbacks: 11 Taylor Genuser; Running backs: 12 Dominique Carson; 24 Jeffrey Mack; 20 Drew Prohaska; Wide receivers: 2 Fred Bruno; 80 Anthony Eboreime; 8 Jeremiah Oates; 1 Maurice Young	Offensive linemen: 78 Darius Barnes; 55 Arthur Doakes; 64 Matt Rahn; Defensive linemen: 4 Devon Bridges; 60 Devin Groenhagen; 11 Westly Johnson; 70 Marcus Miles	Linebackers: 6 Marlon Lobban; 18 Zac Schlueger; Defensive backs: 9 Denzel Adams; 7 DeWayne Autrey; 3 Rahn Franklin; 23 Jon Smith; 5 Clifford Stokes; 15 Jemichael Williams; Special teams: 60 Greg Conry	Reserve lists: -- Kyle Cool QB (Susp.); -- Jackson Dallas OL (Exempt); -- Ayrius Justin WR (Exempt); Rookies in italics Roster updated June 6, 2017; 23 Active, 3 Inactive → More rosters
