= 2012 Sioux Falls Storm season =

Indoor Football League team season

- Owner: Todd Tryon
- Head coach: Kurtiss Riggs
- Home stadium: Sioux Falls Arena

Results
- Record: 14–0
- Conference place: 1st United
- Playoffs: Won UC Semifinals (Steelhawks) 79-21; Won UC Championship (Blizzard) 61-42; Won 2012 United Bowl (Fever) 59-32

The 2012 Sioux Falls Storm season was the team's thirteenth season as a professional indoor football franchise and fourth in the Indoor Football League (IFL). One of fourteen teams competing in the IFL for the 2012 season, the Storm were members of the United Conference.

Led by head coach Kurtiss Riggs, the Storm played their home games at the Sioux Falls Arena in Sioux Falls, South Dakota. Sioux Falls entered the 2012 season following winning in the league's "United Bowl" championship game in 2011.

== Schedule ==
Key: Win Tie Loss Bye

=== Regular season ===
All start times are local time

Week	Day	Date	Kickoff	Opponent	Results		Location
Week	Day	Date	Kickoff	Opponent	Score	Record	Location
1	BYE						
2	Sunday	February 26	2:05pm	Green Bay Blizzard	W 73-43	1-0	Sioux Falls Arena
3	BYE						
4	Friday	March 9	7:05pm	at Wichita Wild	W 81-54	2-0	Hartman Arena
5	BYE						
6	Saturday	March 24	7:00pm	at Reading Express	W 75-42	3-0	Sovereign Center
7	Sunday	April 1	2:05pm	Cedar Rapids Titans	W 69-29	4-0	Sioux Falls Arena
8	Sunday	April 8	4:05pm	Chicago Slaughter	W 73-45	5-0	Sioux Falls Arena
9	Saturday	April 14	7:05pm	at Allen Wranglers	W 52-45	6-0	Allen Event Center
10	Saturday	April 21	7:05pm	Nebraska Danger	W 76-49	7-0	Sioux Falls Arena
11	Saturday	April 27	7:05pm	at Omaha Beef	W 49-37	8-0	Omaha Civic Auditorium
12	BYE						
13	Saturday	May 12	7:05pm	Tri-Cities Fever	W 55-16	9-0	Sioux Falls Arena
14	Saturday	May 19	7:00pm	at Green Bay Blizzard	W 66-39	10-0	Resch Center
15	Saturday	May 26	7:05pm	at Tri-Cities Fever	W 73-72	11-0	Toyota Center
16	Friday	June 1	7:05pm	at Wyoming Cavalry	W 71-46	12-0	Casper Events Center
17	Saturday	June 9	7:05pm	Colorado Ice	W 69-26	13-0	Sioux Falls Arena
18	Saturday	June 16	7:05pm	Omaha Beef	W 59-20	14-0	Sioux Falls Arena

=== Post-season ===
Round	Day	Date	Kickoff	Opponent	Results		Location
Round	Day	Date	Kickoff	Opponent	Final Score	Record	Location
United Conference Semifinal	Saturday	June 23	7:05pm	Lehigh Valley Steelhawks	W 79-21	1-0	Sioux Falls Arena
United Conference Championship	Saturday	June 30	7:05pm	Green Bay Blizzard	W 61-42	2-0	Sioux Falls Arena
United Bowl	Saturday	July 14	7:35pm	Tri-Cities Fever	W 59-32	3-0	Sioux Falls Arena

== Roster ==
2012 Sioux Falls Storm roster
Quarterbacks: 2 Chris Dixon; Running backs: 24 Andre Crenshaw; 16 Brandon Walker; Wide receivers: 4 Carl Sims; 1 Clinton Solomon; 9 James Terry; 8 Korey Williams	Offensive linemen: 71 Gerald Davis; 55 Charlie Sanders; 75 Myniya Smith; Defensive linemen: 52 Rachman Crable; 96 Cory Johnson; 12 Sean Kelly; 56 Jeremiah Price	Linebackers: 44 Dejuan Fulghum; 23 Xavier Jordan; Defensive backs: 3 Kenneth Akridge; 2 Stewart Franks; 20 Dan O'Keefe; 15 Justin Welch; 19 Patrick Wells; Kickers: 11 Parker Douglass	Injured Reserve: currently vacant; Exempt List: 16 Shawn Lemon DL (Exempt); Practice squad: currently vacant; rookies in italics Roster updated July 14, 2012; 22 Active, 1 Inactive, 0 PS → More rosters

== Standings ==
2012 United Conference
	W	L	T	PCT	PF	PA	DIV	GB	STK
y Sioux Falls Storm	14	0	0	1.000	941	563	7-0	---	W14
x Green Bay Blizzard	11	3	0	0.786	787	586	10-3	3.0	W3
x Bloomington Edge	10	4	0	0.714	673	604	10-3	4.0	W1
x Lehigh Valley Steelhawks	6	8	0	0.429	605	615	6-8	8.0	W1
Omaha Beef	6	8	0	0.429	635	696	3-3	4.0	L2
Chicago Slaughter	6	8	0	0.429	657	714	6-8	4.0	L1
Cedar Rapids Titans	4	10	0	0.286	509	631	4-0	10.0	W1
Reading Express	2	12	0	0.143	534	773	7-1	12.0	L5
