= 2014 Salina Bombers season =

- Owner: Chris Vercher; Jake Leighty
- General manager: Mike Reid
- Head coach: Bob Frey; Eric Clayton; Bob Ray
- Home stadium: Bicentennial Center; 800 The Midway; Salina, Kansas 67401

Results
- Record: 8–4 (regular season)
- League place: 3rd

The 2014 Salina Bombers season was the team's second season as a professional indoor football franchise and second as a member of the Champions Professional Indoor Football League. One of nine teams in the CPIFL for the league's final season, the Salina Bombers were owned by Chris Vercher. The Bombers played their home games at the Bicentennial Center in Salina, Kansas, under the direction of three head coaches in 2014. Coach Bob Frey began the year before stepping down and was succeeded by Eric Clayton. Clayton resigned and was replaced by Bob Ray.

== Season summary ==
In 2014, the Bombers finished the regular season with a record of 8-4, good enough for 3rd place in the final CPIFL standings. They were defeated 66-37 by the Sioux City Bandits at the Tyson Events Center in the first round of the post-season. Standout players this season included defensive linebacker Meshak Williams who claimed both Defensive Rookie of the Year and Defensive Player of the Year honors from the CPIFL.

== Off-field moves ==
After the 2014 season ended, the Champions Professional Indoor Football League announced it was merging with teams from other leagues to form a new league, Champions Indoor Football.

== Awards and honors ==
- 2014 1st Team All CPIFL: Ed Prince OL, Meshak Williams DL, DeWayne Autrey DB
- 2014 CPIFL Defensive Player of the Year: Meshak Williams DL
- 2014 CPIFL Defensive Rookie of The Year: Meshak Williams DL
- 2014 CPIFL Best Media Relations/Social Media

== Schedule ==
Key: Win Tie Loss Bye

=== Pre-season ===
Week	Day	Date	Kickoff	Opponent	Results		Location	Attendance
Week	Day	Date	Kickoff	Opponent	Score	Record	Location	Attendance
1	Sunday	February 16	2:30pm	Kansas City Bulldogs	W 75–6	1–0	Bicentennial Center	
2	Saturday	February 22	7:05pm	Kansas Koyotes	W 75–8	2–0	Bicentennial Center	

=== Regular season ===
Week	Day	Date	Kickoff	Opponent	Results		Location	Attendance
Week	Day	Date	Kickoff	Opponent	Score	Record	Location	Attendance
1	Sunday	March 2	3:00pm	at Sioux City Bandits	W 77–70 (OT)	1–0	Tyson Events Center	2,317
2	Friday	March 7	7:05pm	Bloomington Edge	W 56–20	2–0	Bicentennial Center	
3	BYE							
4	Sunday	March 23	3:00pm	at Kansas Koyotes	W 51–27	3–0	Landon Arena	
5	Saturday	March 29	7:05pm	at Dodge City Law	L 31–34	3–1	United Wireless Arena	
6	BYE							
7	Saturday	April 12	7:05pm	Dodge City Law	W 57–45	4–1	Bicentennial Center	
8	BYE							
9	Saturday	April 26	7:05pm	Sioux City Bandits	L 42–56	4–2	Bicentennial Center	
10	Saturday	May 3	7:05pm	Wichita Wild	W 13–11	5–2	Bicentennial Center	
11	Saturday	May 10	7:05pm	at Bloomington Edge	L 50–58	5–3	U.S. Cellular Coliseum	1,252
12	Saturday	May 17	7:05pm	at Oklahoma Defenders	W 60–40	6–3	Cox Business Center	
13	Friday	May 23	7:05pm	Lincoln Haymakers	W 36–15	7–3	Bicentennial Center	
14	Saturday	May 31	7:05pm	Omaha Beef	W 50–43	8–3	Bicentennial Center	
15	Saturday	June 7	7:05pm	at Wichita Wild	L 41–63	8–4	Hartman Arena	3,784

=== Post-season ===
Week	Day	Date	Kickoff	Opponent	Results		Location	Attendance
Week	Day	Date	Kickoff	Opponent	Score	Record	Location	Attendance
Semi-finals	Saturday	June 14	7:05pm	at Sioux City Bandits	L 37–66	0–1	Tyson Events Center	2,007

== Roster ==
2014 Salina Bombers roster
Quarterbacks: 6 Chris Rini; 9 Dane Simoneau; 12 Robbie Nallenweg; Running backs: 33 Quentin Benning; 25 Keithen Valentine; Wide receivers: 8 Corey Ham; 80 Zach McClain; -- Felix Moret; 7 Ricky Roberts; -- Tremon Robinson; 5 Attrail Snipes	Offensive linemen: 75 George Bias; 56 Rod Ewing; 65 Roy Richard; -- Allan Stroud; Defensive linemen: 45 Nathan Carter DL/LB; 63 Eric Cherry; 34 Adam Davis; 88 Brandon McKinney; 42 Meshak Williams	Linebackers: 11 Vernon Brooks; 20 Jake Lattimer; 4 Justiss Scales; Defensive backs: 1 DeWayne Autrey; 13 Ira Autrey; 19 Isiah Barfield; 23 Jarard Milo; 2 Taikwon Paige; Special teams: 99 Austin Ledy	Reserve lists: 84 Pelton Smalls WR (IR); 3 Jacarious Lucas WR (IR); 55 Ed Prince WR (Exempt); Roster updated June 2, 2014; Transactions; 28 Active, 3 Inactive → More rosters
