= Meshak Williams =

American football player (born 1991)

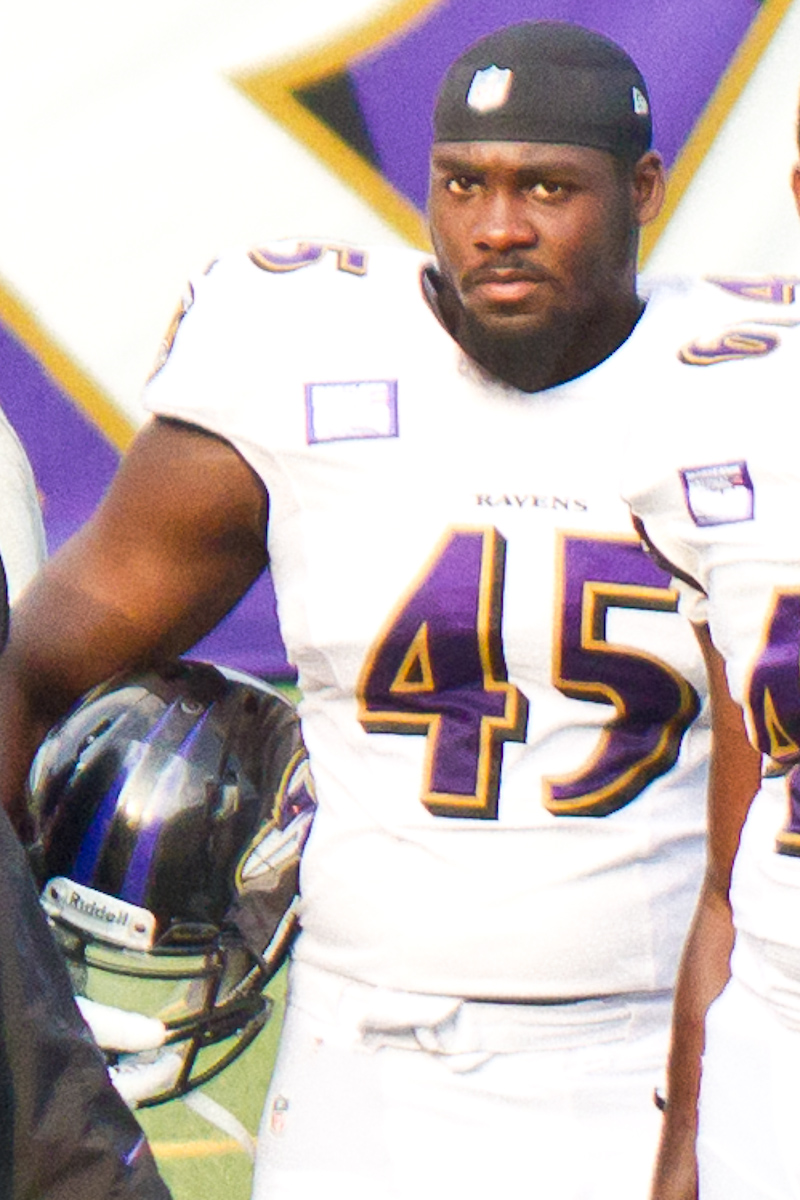
- Williams at Ravens M&T Bank Stadium practice in August 2013

No. 42, 44
- Position: Defensive end

Personal information
- Born: June 3, 1991 (age 35); Sylvester, Georgia, U.S.
- Listed height: 6 ft 3 in (1.91 m)
- Listed weight: 245 lb (111 kg)

Career information
- High school: Worth County (Sylvester, Georgia)
- College: Kansas State
- NFL draft: 2013: undrafted

Career history
- Baltimore Ravens (2013)*; Salina Bombers (2014); Orlando Predators (2014–2016); Cleveland Gladiators (2016); Texas Revolution (2017); Tampa Bay Storm (2017); Texas Revolution (2018–2019)
- * Offseason or practice squad member only

Awards and highlights
- CIF champion (2017); CPIFL Defensive Player of the Year (2014); CPIFL Defensive Rookie of the Year (2014); Big 12 Defensive Lineman of the Year (2012); First-team All-Big 12 (2012)

Career AFL statistics
- Total tackles: 36.5
- Sacks: 6
- Interceptions: 2
- Stats at ArenaFan.com
- Stats at Pro Football Reference

Meshak Williams (born June 3, 1991) is an American former football defensive end. He played college football at Kansas State, and signed with the Baltimore Ravens as an undrafted free agent in 2013.

== Early life ==
Meshak attended Worth County High School in Sylvester, Georgia. He lettered three years for the Worth County Rams at defensive end and tight end, advancing to the Georgia state playoffs his sophomore and junior seasons. He recorded 70 tackles to go along with 14 sacks as a junior, while he tallied 83 tackles and a school-record 23 sacks as a senior. Rated as a two-star recruit by Rivals.com, he accepted a scholarship offer from Kansas State.

== College career ==
=== Hutchinson Community College ===
Meshak did not qualify for Kansas State, so he decided to play at Hutchinson Community College until he could be academically qualified. After his 2009 season, he played in 12 games in 2010, recording 44 tackles (18 solo, 26 assisted) as well as 17.0 tackles for a loss, also had eight sacks.

=== Kansas State ===
After two years at community college, Williams enrolled at Kansas State in 2011. As a junior, he recorded 28 tackles, including 10 for loss and seven sacks to go along with a forced fumble and a recovery. He was tied for sixth in the Big 12 in sacks, while his total was the most by a Wildcat in three years. As a senior in 2012, he improved upon his junior statistics and became one of the most prominent defensive players in the Big 12. He recorded 45 tackles, including 17 for loss and eleven sacks to go along with three forced fumbles. He was named to the All-Big 12 first-team.

== Professional career ==
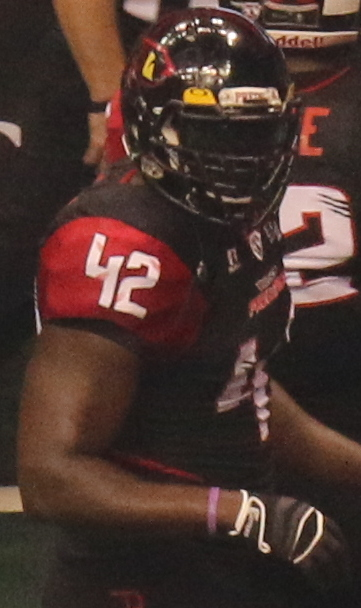
Williams with the Orlando Predators in 2015

=== Baltimore Ravens ===
Williams was considered a draftable prospect in the 2013 NFL draft. He went undrafted, and was signed as an undrafted free agent by the Baltimore Ravens. He spent the 2013 summer in Albany, Georgia training with the Deerfield-Windsor School Knights football team, the 2012 GISA AAA state champions. On August 25, 2013, he was waived by the Ravens.

=== Orlando Predators ===
In 2014, Williams joined the AFL's Orlando Predators. He recorded 2 tackles in one game in 2014 and 29.5 tackles with 5.5 sacks in 17 games in 2015.

=== Cleveland Gladiators ===
On April 19, 2016, Williams was assigned to the Cleveland Gladiators. On June 7, 2016, Williams was placed on reassignment.

=== Texas Revolution ===
On January 9, 2017, Williams signed with the Texas Revolution.

=== Tampa Bay Storm ===
On July 26, 2017, Williams was assigned to the Tampa Bay Storm. The Storm folded in December 2017.
