= 2014 Dodge City Law season =

- Owner: Ricky Bertz
- General manager: Ricky Bertz
- Head coach: Sean Ponder
- Home stadium: United Wireless Arena

Results
- Record: 8–4
- League place: 4th
- Playoffs: Lost semi-finals (Wichita Wild) 31-33

The 2014 Dodge City Law season was the team's first season as a professional indoor football franchise and only season as a member of the Champions Professional Indoor Football League (CPIFL). One of nine teams in the CPIFL for the 2014 season, the Law were owned and operated by Ricky Bertz. The Law played their home games at the United Wireless Arena in Dodge City, Kansas, under the direction of head coach Sean Ponder.

== Season summary ==
The Law began its inaugural season with a road win over the Omaha Beef. The team lost the next two games but regained its footing to win 6 of the following 7 contests. A home loss to the Wichita Wild and a win over the faltering Kansas Koyotes rounded out the regular season. The Law finished with an 8–4 record, 4th best in the league and good enough to put the team in the playoffs. They lost their semi-final game to eventual league champion Wichita Wild 31–33. After the season ended, the CPIFL announced it was merging with teams from other leagues to form Champions Indoor Football.

== Schedule ==
Key: Win Tie Loss Bye

=== Regular season ===
Week	Day	Date	Kickoff	Opponent	Results		Location
Week	Day	Date	Kickoff	Opponent	Score	Record	Location
1	Sunday	March 2	7:00pm	at Omaha Beef	W 63–68	1–0	Ralston Arena
2	Saturday	March 8	7:05pm	Oklahoma Defenders	L 49–56	1–1	United Wireless Arena
3	BYE						
4	Saturday	March 22	7:05pm	at Wichita Wild	L 7–40	1–2	Hartman Arena
5	Saturday	March 29	7:05pm	Salina Bombers	W 34–31	2–2	United Wireless Arena
6	Saturday	April 5	7:05pm	at Bloomington Edge	W 57–47	3–2	U.S. Cellular Coliseum
7	Saturday	April 12	7:05pm	at Salina Bombers	L 45–57	3–3	Bicentennial Center
8	Saturday	April 19	7:05pm	Lincoln Haymakers	W 58–41	4–3	United Wireless Arena
9	Saturday	April 26	7:05pm	at Kansas Koyotes	W 33–12	5–3	Landon Arena
10	Saturday	May 3	7:05pm	Omaha Beef	W 60–20	6–3	United Wireless Arena
11	Saturday	May 10	7:05pm	at Oklahoma Defenders	W 56–33	7–3	Cox Business Center
12	BYE						
13	Saturday	May 24	7:05pm	Wichita Wild	L 38–47	7–4	United Wireless Arena
14	BYE						
15	Saturday	June 7	7:05pm	Kansas Koyotes	W 62–26	8–4	United Wireless Arena

=== Playoffs ===
Week	Day	Date	Kickoff	Opponent	Results		Location
Week	Day	Date	Kickoff	Opponent	Score	Record	Location
1	Saturday	June 14	7:05pm	at Wichita Wild	L 31–33	0–1	Hartman Arena

== Roster ==
2014 Dodge City Law roster
Quarterbacks: 11 Joshua Floyd; 1 Charles McCullum; Running backs: 21 Dominique Carson; Wide receivers: 10 Dello Davis; 17 Kendrick Ings; 9 Brandon Venson; — Maurice Young	Offensive linemen: 55 Anthony Jackson; 50 Kyle McManus; 71 Mack Randall Jr.; 77 Tyler White; Defensive linemen: 94 Jarret Bilbrey; 93 Andy Endemann; 90 Marquis George; 16 Mike Graise; 70 Quentin Johnson; 54 Jamar Seard	Linebackers: 5 Walner Leandre; 8 Jecorey Quarterman; Defensive backs: 6 DaeJohn Love; 26 T. J. McCord; 7 Paul Robinson; 3 Cordney Sanders; 22 Mark Sterling; 4 Cashmin Thomas; Kickers: 15 Jared Wood	Injured reserve: 70 Zach Roth OL (long-term); Transfer list: 98 Alex Fambrough K; — Raymond Little DB; Refuse to report: 10 Garrett Tidwell WR/QB; 3 Michael Bragg DB; Roster updated May 22, 2014; Transactions; 26 Active, 5 Inactive
