= 2012 Cedar Rapids Titans season =

Indoor Football League team season

- Owner: Chris Kokalis; Bob Sullivan; Mike Polaski; Angelique Wonders; Kenneth Moninski
- General manager: Chris Kokalis
- Head coach: Kyle Moore-Brown
- Home stadium: Cedar Rapids Ice Arena

Results
- Record: 4-10
- Division place: none
- Conference place: 7th United
- League place: 13th of 16
- Playoffs: Did not qualify

The 2012 Cedar Rapids Titans season was the first for the indoor American football team that played its inaugural season in the Indoor Football League (IFL). The team hosted their home games at the Cedar Rapids Ice Arena, situated in Cedar Rapids, Iowa.

In August 2011, it was announced that the Cedar Rapids Titans would become an expansion team of the Indoor Football League for the 2012 season. Titans' General Manager Chris Kolalis stated, "We believe that Cedar Rapids is a fantastic market to bring a team into. We hope to promote economic development and be a part of the growth of the community by being active and giving back to the fans." The team also announced that they would play their home games at the Cedar Rapids Ice Arena, with the intentions to play in the newly renovated, U.S. Cellular Center in 2013.

On November 18, 2011, the Titans hired former NFL player, Kyle Moore-Brown, as the first coach in franchise history. They won their inaugural game on March 3, 2012, with a 32–13 win over Lehigh Valley Steelhawks.

== Regular season ==
| Week | Day | Date | Kickoff | Opponent | Results | | Location |
| Week | Day | Date | Kickoff | Opponent | Score | Record | Location |
|---|---|---|---|---|---|---|---|
| 1 | Bye Week | | | | | | |
| 2 | Bye Week | | | | | | |
| 3 | Saturday | March 3 | 7:00 | Lehigh Valley Steelhawks | W 32-13 | 1-0 | Cedar Rapids Ice Arena |
| 4 | Friday | March 9 | N/A | at Green Bay Blizzard | L 12-64 | 1-1 | Resch Center |
| 5 | Bye Week | | | | | | |
| 6 | Friday | March 23 | 7:00 | Chicago Slaughter | W 52-40 | 2-1 | Cedar Rapids Ice Arena |
| 7 | Sunday | April 1 | N/A | at Sioux Falls Storm | L 29-69 | 2-2 | Sioux Falls Arena |
| 8 | Saturday | April 7 | 7:00 | Green Bay Blizzard | L 46-59 | 2-3 | Cedar Rapids Ice Arena |
| 9 | Saturday | April 14 | N/A | at Lehigh Valley Steelhawks | L 19-25 | 2-4 | Stabler Arena |
| 10 | Saturday | April 21 | 7:00 | Omaha Beef | L 44-50 | 2-5 | Cedar Rapids Ice Arena |
| 11 | Saturday | April 28 | N/A | at Reading Express | L 47-51 | 2-6 | Sovereign Center |
| 12 | Saturday | May 5 | N/A | at Chicago Slaughter | L 38-41 | 2-7 | Sears Centre |
| 13 | Saturday | May 12 | 7:00 | Reading Express | W 38-27 | 3-7 | Cedar Rapids Ice Arena |
| 14 | Friday | May 18 | 7:00 | Bloomington Edge | L 13-29 | 3-8 | Cedar Rapids Ice Arena |
| 15 | Bye Week | | | | | | |
| 16 | Friday | June 1 | N/A | at Omaha Beef | L 33-51 | 3-9 | Omaha Civic Auditorium |
| 17 | Friday | June 8 | N/A | at Bloomington Edge | L 64-74 | 3-10 | U.S. Cellular Coliseum |
| 18 | Saturday | June 16 | 7:00 | Nebraska Danger | W 42-38 | 4-10 | Cedar Rapids Ice Arena |

2012 United Conference
| | W | L | T | PCT | PF | PA | DIV | GB | STK |
|---|---|---|---|---|---|---|---|---|---|
| y Sioux Falls Storm | 14 | 0 | 0 | 1.000 | 941 | 563 | 7-0 | --- | W14 |
| x Green Bay Blizzard | 11 | 3 | 0 | 0.786 | 787 | 586 | 10-3 | 3.0 | W3 |
| x Bloomington Edge | 10 | 4 | 0 | 0.714 | 673 | 604 | 10-3 | 4.0 | W1 |
| x Lehigh Valley Steelhawks | 6 | 8 | 0 | 0.429 | 605 | 615 | 6-8 | 8.0 | W1 |
| Omaha Beef | 6 | 8 | 0 | 0.429 | 635 | 696 | 3-3 | 4.0 | L2 |
| Chicago Slaughter | 6 | 8 | 0 | 0.429 | 657 | 714 | 6-8 | 4.0 | L1 |
| Cedar Rapids Titans | 4 | 10 | 0 | 0.286 | 509 | 631 | 4-0 | 10.0 | W1 |
| Reading Express | 2 | 12 | 0 | 0.143 | 534 | 773 | 7-1 | 12.0 | L5 |

== Roster ==
2012 Cedar Rapids Titans roster
| Quarterbacks: 7 Kenneth Black Jr.; 13 Colton Hansen; Running backs: 12 Andre Crenshaw; 3 Travis Rhone; Wide receivers: 6 Tyler Batts; 8 Antuan Bloom; 4 Johnny Gray; 11 Everett Roberts; 2 Johnnie King III; 17 Eric McCain | Offensive linemen: 56 Juliene Adams; 78 Travis Miller; 75 Michael Wormley; Defensive linemen: 53 Korey Hollinshed; 93 Xzavie Jackson; 54 Jeremy Maddox; 92 William Stokes; 77 Tony Tucker; 48 Vernard Wilkins | Linebackers: currently vacant; Defensive backs: 20 Jamil Abdullah; 37 George Carpenter; 10 Devin King; 28 T. J. Simmons; 24 Tommie Williams; Kickers: 18 Scott Enos | Injured Reserve: -- Nick Campbell WR (IR); -- Brian McIntire LB (IR); Refuse To Report: -- Josh Adams (DNR); -- Joshua Crawford WR (DNR); -- Alexander Robinson RB (DNR); Roster updated June 24, 2012; 25 Active, 5 Inactive → More rosters |
