= 2012 Chicago Slaughter season =

Indoor Football League team season

- Owner: Jim McMahon
- Head coach: Steve McMichael
- Home stadium: Sears Centre; 101 South Madison Street; Hoffman Estates, IL 60701

Results
- Record: 6-8
- Conference place: 6th United
- Playoffs: did not qualify

The 2012 Chicago Slaughter season was the team's sixth season as a professional indoor football franchise and third in the Indoor Football League (IFL). One of sixteen teams competing in the IFL for the 2012 season, the Hoffman Estates, Illinois-based Chicago Slaughter were members of the United Conference.

Under the leadership of owner Jim McMahon, and head coach Steve McMichael, the team played their home games at the Sears Centre in Hoffman Estates, Illinois.

== Schedule ==
Key: Win Tie Loss Bye

=== Regular season ===
All start times are local time

Week	Day	Date	Kickoff	Opponent	Results		Location	Attendance
Week	Day	Date	Kickoff	Opponent	Score	Record	Location	Attendance
1	Sunday	February 19	2:08 pm	Bloomington Edge	W 50-34	1-0	Sears Centre	3,157
2	Friday	February 24	7:35 pm	at Lehigh Valley Steelhawks	L 28-30	1-1	Stabler Arena	
3	Saturday	March 3	7:05 pm	at Bloomington Edge	L 44-55	1-2	U.S. Cellular Coliseum	
4	BYE							
5	BYE							
6	Friday	March 23	2:05 pm	at Cedar Rapids Titans	L 40-52	1-3	Cedar Rapids Ice Arena	
7	Saturday	March 31	7:05 pm	Bloomington Edge	L 65-70	1-4	Sears Centre	4,419
8	Sunday	April 8	4:05 pm	at Sioux Falls Storm	W 45-73	1-5	Sioux Falls Arena	
9	Friday	April 13	7:30 pm	at Green Bay Blizzard	L 36-63	1-6	Resch Center	5,346
10	Saturday	April 21	7:05 pm	Green Bay Blizzard	W 45-42	2-6	Sears Centre	5,024
11	Saturday	April 28	7:00 pm	at Lehigh Valley Steelhawks	W 54-51	3-6	Stabler Arena	
12	Saturday	May 5	7:05 pm	Cedar Rapids Titans	W 41-38	4-6	Sears Centre	2,732
13	BYE							
14	Friday	May 18	7:05 pm	Reading Express	W 67-50	5-6	Sears Centre	3,079
15	Friday	May 25	7:05 pm	at Bloomington Edge	L 43-62	5-7	U.S. Cellular Coliseum	3,881
16	Saturday	June 2	7:05 pm	at Reading Express	W 46-40	6-7	Sovereign Center	
17	Friday	June 8	7:05 pm	Lehigh Valley Steelhawks	L 53-54	6-8	Sears Centre	3,378
18	BYE							

== Postseason ==
Week	Day	Date	Kickoff	Opponent	Results		Location
Week	Day	Date	Kickoff	Opponent	Score	Record	Location
UC Semifinals	Saturday	June 23	7:00 pm	at Green Bay Blizzard	L 30-51	0-1	Resch Center

== Roster ==
2012 Chicago Slaughter roster
Quarterbacks: 10 Perry Patterson; 7 Juice Williams; Running backs: 3 Daniel DuFrene; 13 Lucian Walker; Wide receivers: 11 David Brown; 30 Shatone Powers; 4 Eyad Salem; 2 Tony Taylor	Offensive linemen: 75 Jack Breckner; 77 Anthony Bullock; 71 Brandon Ford; 67 Javon Potter; 72 Prenny Stokes; Defensive linemen: 1 Lorenzo Hood; 95 Kyle Jenkins; 12 Jon Kowalyshen; 55 Ronnie Mason; 98 Chris Turner	Linebackers: 9 Matt Boswell; 8 Lenny Radtke; Defensive backs: 24 Calvin Gant; 23 Bryan Jackson; 6 Christopher Rodgers; 5 Marcus Winn; Kickers: 25 Chris Nendick	Injured Reserve: currently vacant; Exempt List: currently vacant; Refused to Report: currently vacant; rookies in italics Roster updated June 8, 2012; 25 Active, 0 Inactive → More rosters

== Standings ==
2012 United Conference
	W	L	T	PCT	PF	PA	DIV	GB	STK
y Sioux Falls Storm	14	0	0	1.000	941	563	7-0	---	W14
x Green Bay Blizzard	11	3	0	0.786	787	586	10-3	3.0	W3
x Bloomington Edge	10	4	0	0.714	673	604	10-3	4.0	W1
x Lehigh Valley Steelhawks	6	8	0	0.429	605	615	6-8	8.0	W1
Omaha Beef	6	8	0	0.429	635	696	3-3	4.0	L2
Chicago Slaughter	6	8	0	0.429	657	714	6-8	4.0	L1
Cedar Rapids Titans	4	10	0	0.286	509	631	4-0	10.0	W1
Reading Express	2	12	0	0.143	534	773	7-1	12.0	L5
