= 2013 Salina Bombers season =

- Owner: Chris Vercher; Jake Leighty; Jake Sharp
- General manager: Mike Reid
- Head coach: Bob Frey
- Home stadium: Bicentennial Center; 800 The Midway; Salina, Kansas 67401

Results
- Record: 9–3 (regular season)
- League place: 4th

The 2013 Salina Bombers season was the team's first season as a professional indoor football franchise and first as a member of the Champions Professional Indoor Football League. One of ten teams in the CPIFL for the league's inaugural season, the Salina Bombers were owned by Chris Vercher. The Force played their home games at the Bicentennial Center in Salina, Kansas, under the direction of veteran head coach Bob Frey.

== Season summary ==
With a 9–3 record, the Bombers finished 4th in the final CPIFL standings, which qualified the team for the playoffs. The Bombers traveled to Sioux City, Iowa, where they defeated the first-seeded Sioux City Bandits to advance to the Champions Bowl. In the first-ever Champions Bowl, the Bombers were defeated 47–34 by the Wichita Wild. Despite the loss, head coach Bob Frey was named CPIFL Coach Of Year for 2013.

== Awards and honors ==
- 2013 Defensive Rookie of The Year: DeWayne Autrey DB
- 2013 1st Team All CPIFL: Ricky Roberts WR, Jarvis Jones OL, DeWayne Autrey DB
- 2013 CPIFL Offensive MVP: Dane Simoneau QB
- 2013 CPIFL Coach Of Year: Bob Frey

== Schedule ==
Key: Win Tie Loss Bye

=== Regular season ===
Week	Day	Date	Kickoff	Opponent	Results		Location	Attendance
Week	Day	Date	Kickoff	Opponent	Score	Record	Location	Attendance
1	BYE							
2	Saturday	March 16	7:30pm	Wichita Wild	L 34–63	0–1	Bicentennial Center	5,119
3	BYE							
4	Saturday	March 30	7:30pm	Mid-Missouri Outlaws	W 43–21	1–1	Bicentennial Center	3,714
5	Saturday	April 6	7:30pm	Oklahoma Defenders	W 50–31	2–1	Bicentennial Center	
6	Friday	April 12	7:30pm	Sioux City Bandits	L 43–46	2–2	Bicentennial Center	3,362
7	Friday	April 19	7:05pm	at Lincoln Haymakers	W 31–19	3–2	Pershing Center	1,289
8	Saturday	April 27	7:30pm	at Kansas City Renegades	W 47–31	4–2	Kemper Arena	
9	Saturday	May 4	7:30pm	at Kansas Koyotes	W 55–31	5–2	Landon Arena	
10	Saturday	May 11	7:05pm	at Wichita Wild	L 40–45	5–3	Hartman Arena	3,624
11	Saturday	May 18	7:30pm	Kansas Koyotes	W 37–20	6–3	Bicentennial Center	
12	Saturday	May 25	7:30pm	Lincoln Haymakers	W 46–14	7–3	Bicentennial Center	3,163
13	Saturday	June 1	7:30pm	at Mid-Missouri Outlaws	W 48–23	8–3	Mathewson Exhibition Center	
14	Saturday	June 8	7:30pm	at Oklahoma Defenders	W 46–34	9–3	Cox Business Center	

=== Post-season ===
Week	Day	Date	Kickoff	Opponent	Results		Location	Attendance
Week	Day	Date	Kickoff	Opponent	Score	Record	Location	Attendance
Semi-finals	Saturday	June 15	7:05pm	at Sioux City Bandits	W 28–26	1–0	Tyson Events Center	3,415
Champions Bowl I	Saturday	June 22	7:05pm	at Wichita Wild	L 34–47	1–1	Hartman Arena	4,057

== Roster ==
2013 Salina Bombers roster
Quarterbacks: 1 Travis Hunter; 9 Dane Simoneau; Running backs: 26 Demetrius Cox; 11 Frank Miles; Wide receivers: 8 Corey Ham; 14 Seth Myers; 7 Ricky Roberts; 84 Pelton Smalls; 80 Attrail Snipes	Offensive linemen: 73 Jarvis Jones; 55 Ed Prince; 65 Roy Richard; 77 John Steel; Defensive linemen: 34 Quentin Benning; 58 Kyron Hill; 20 Jake Lattimer; 88 Brandon McKinney; 90 Ben Pister	Linebackers: 10 Adrian Thomas; Defensive backs: 5 DeWayne Autrey; 2 Ira Autrey; 15 Isiah Barfield; 6 Paul Barber; 21 Cory Dunbar; 4 Justice Scales; Kickers: 13 Corey Hoover	Injured Reserve: currently vacant; Exempt List: currently vacant; Practice squad: 27 Benardis Hughes WR; 79 Ryan Peterson OL; 75 Tyler Vogt OL; 3 Zach Waggoner QB; rookies in italics Roster updated June 22, 2013; 26 Active, 0 Inactive, 4 PS → More rosters
