= 2012 Lehigh Valley Steelhawks season =

Professional indoor football team's 2012 season

- Owner: Glenn W. Clark
- General manager: Michael Clark
- Head coach: Chris Thompson
- Home stadium: Stabler Arena

Results
- Record: 6-8
- Conference place: 4th
- Playoffs: Lost UC Semifinals (Storm) 21-79

The 2012 Lehigh Valley Steelhawks season was the second season as a professional indoor football franchise and their second in the Indoor Football League (IFL). One of 16 teams competing in the IFL for the 2012 season, the Lehigh Valley Steelhawks were members of the United Conference.

The team played their home games under head coach Chris Thompson at the Stabler Arena in Bethlehem, Pennsylvania. The Steelhawks earned a 6-8 record, placing 4th in the United Conference, qualifying for the 4th and final playoff spot. They were defeated in the United Conference Semifinals, 21-79 by the Sioux Falls Storm.

== Schedule ==
Key: Win Tie Loss Bye

=== Regular season ===
All start times are local to home team

Week	Day	Date	Kickoff	Opponent	Results		Location
Week	Day	Date	Kickoff	Opponent	Score	Record	Location
1	BYE						
2	Friday	February 24	7:35pm	Chicago Slaughter	W 30-28	1–0	Stabler Arena
3	Saturday	March 3	7:05pm	at Cedar Rapids Titans	L 13-32	1–1	U.S. Cellular Center
4	Sunday	March 11	4:00pm	Bloomington Edge	L 39-57	1–2	Stabler Arena
5	Saturday	March 17	7:00pm	Reading Express	W 86-53	2-2	Stabler Arena
6	Saturday	March 24	7:35pm	at Bloomington Edge	L 34-36	2–3	U.S. Cellular Coliseum
7	BYE						
8	Friday	April 7	7:00pm	at Reading Express	W 62-41	3-3	Sovereign Center
9	Saturday	April 14	7:00pm	Cedar Rapids Titans	W 25-19	4-3	Stabler Arena
10	BYE						
11	Saturday	April 28	7:00pm	Chicago Slaughter	L 51-54	4-4	Stabler Arena
12	Saturday	May 5	7:00pm	at Reading Express	L 34-37	4–5	Sovereign Center
13	Friday	May 11	7:00pm	at Green Bay Blizzard	L 61-76	4-6	Resch Center
14	Saturday	May 19	7:00pm	Omaha Beef	L 44-64	4-7	Stabler Arena
15	Saturday	May 26	7:00pm	Reading Express	W 39-24	5-7	Stabler Arena
16	Saturday	June 2	7:00pm	Green Bay Blizzard	L 33-41	5-8	Stabler Arena
17	Friday	June 8	7:35pm	at Chicago Slaughter	W 54-53	6-8	Sears Centre
18	BYE						

=== Postseason ===
Round	Day	Date	Kickoff	Opponent	Results		Location
Round	Day	Date	Kickoff	Opponent	Score	Record	Location
UC Semifinals	Saturday	June 23	7:00pm	at Sioux Falls Storm	L 21-79	0-1	Sioux Falls Arena

== Roster ==
2012 Lehigh Valley Steelhawks roster
Quarterbacks: 7 Chris Malleo; Running backs: 4 Ryan Leafey; 29 James Mallory; Wide receivers: 12 Irani DeAraujo; 1 Alfonso Hoggard; 80 Isaac West	Offensive linemen: 77 Randell Bennett; 75 Michael Byrne; 72 Sean Tetreault; Defensive linemen: 94 Robert Lewis; 99 Victor Sesay; 50 Wes Smith	Linebackers: 22 Matt Cohen; 16 Jamail Berry; Defensive backs: 2 Jesse Cooper; 3 Marvin Johnson; 13 John Kennedy III; Special teams: 10 Carlos Ojeda	Injured Reserve: Currently vacant; Exempt List: -- Jeremy Schonbrunner OL (Exempt); Practice Squad: Currently vacant; Roster updated June 23, 2012; 18 Active, 1 Inactive, 0 PS → More rosters

== Division Standings ==
2012 United Conference
	W	L	T	PCT	PF	PA	DIV	GB	STK
y Sioux Falls Storm	14	0	0	1.000	941	563	7-0	---	W14
x Green Bay Blizzard	11	3	0	0.786	787	586	10-3	3.0	W3
x Bloomington Edge	10	4	0	0.714	673	604	10-3	4.0	W1
x Lehigh Valley Steelhawks	6	8	0	0.429	605	615	6-8	8.0	W1
Omaha Beef	6	8	0	0.429	635	696	3-3	4.0	L2
Chicago Slaughter	6	8	0	0.429	657	714	6-8	4.0	L1
Cedar Rapids Titans	4	10	0	0.286	509	631	4-0	10.0	W1
Reading Express	2	12	0	0.143	534	773	7-1	12.0	L5
