= 2012 Bloomington Edge season =

Indoor Football League team season

- Owner: Jim Morris
- Head coach: Kenton Carr
- Home stadium: U.S. Cellular Coliseum; 101 South Madison Street; Bloomington, IL 60701

Results
- Record: 10-4
- Conference place: 3rd United
- Playoffs: Lost UC Semifinals (Blizzard) 30-51

The 2012 Bloomington Edge season was the team's seventh season as a professional indoor football franchise and fourth in the Indoor Football League (IFL). One of sixteen teams competing in the IFL for the 2012 season, the Bloomington, Illinois-based Bloomington Edge were members of the United Conference.

Under the leadership of owner Jim Morris, and head coach Kenton Carr, the team played their home games at the U.S. Cellular Coliseum in Bloomington, Illinois.

== Schedule ==
Key: Win Tie Loss Bye

=== Regular season ===
All start times are local time

Week	Day	Date	Kickoff	Opponent	Results		Location	Attendance
Week	Day	Date	Kickoff	Opponent	Score	Record	Location	Attendance
1	Saturday	February 19	2:05pm	at Chicago Slaughter	L 34-50	0-1	Sears Centre	3,157
2	Sunday	February 26	3:05pm	Reading Express	W 54-40	1-1	U.S. Cellular Coliseum	5,216
3	Saturday	March 3	7:05pm	Chicago Slaughter	W 55-44	2-1	U.S. Cellular Coliseum	3,871
4	Sunday	March 11	2:05pm	at Lehigh Valley Steelhawks	W 57-39	3-1	Stabler Arena	
5	BYE							
6	Saturday	March 24	7:35pm	Lehigh Valley Steelhawks	W 36-34	4-1	U.S. Cellular Coliseum	
7	Saturday	March 31	7:05pm	at Chicago Slaughter	W 70-65	5-1	Sears Centre	4,419
8	BYE							
9	Saturday	April 14	7:00pm	at Reading Express	W 41-31	6-1	Sovereign Center	
10	Saturday	April 21	7:00pm	Reading Express	W 44-39	7-1	U.S. Cellular Coliseum	3,641
11	Saturday	April 28	7:00pm	at Green Bay Blizzard	L 56-59	7-2	Resch Center	4,270
12	Saturday	May 5	7:05pm	Green Bay Blizzard	L 21-34	7-3	U.S. Cellular Coliseum	3,537
13	BYE							
14	Friday	May 18	7:05pm	at Cedar Rapids Titans	W 29-13	8-3	Cedar Rapids Ice Arena	
15	Friday	May 25	7:05pm	Chicago Slaughter	W 62-43	9-3	U.S. Cellular Coliseum	3,881
16	Saturday	June 2	7:05pm	at Wichita Wild	L 38-39	9-4	Hartman Arena	2,675
17	Friday	June 8	7:05pm	Cedar Rapids Titans	W 74-64	10-4	U.S. Cellular Coliseum	3,985
18	BYE							

== Postseason ==
Week	Day	Date	Kickoff	Opponent	Results		Location
Week	Day	Date	Kickoff	Opponent	Score	Record	Location
UC Semifinals	Saturday	June 23	7:00pm	at Green Bay Blizzard	L 30-51	0-1	Resch Center

== Roster ==
2012 Bloomington Edge roster
Quarterbacks: 5 Dusty Burk; Running backs: 23 Andre Raymond; Wide receivers: 3 Daron Clark; 1 John Cooper; 6 Charles Dowdell; 7 Ricardo Lenhart	Offensive linemen: 72 Cedric Mack; 77 Tim Mueller; 69 Jason Townson; 55 Keenan Wimbley; Defensive linemen: 40 Antonio Ficklin; 96 Quince Holman; 9 Ike Ikenna; 97 Jeff Sobol; 33 Kyle Thomas	Linebackers: 3 Wendell Brown; 11 Taurean Charles; Defensive backs: 24 Rashaad Hayes; 11 Vincent Joseph; 10 Mike McGee; 12 Mario Russell; 25 James Temple; Kickers: 22 Peter Christofilakos	Injured Reserve: 43 Ameer Ismail LB (IR); Exempt List: currently vacant; Refused to Report: currently vacant; rookies in italics Roster updated June 23, 2012; 23 Active, 1 Inactive → More rosters

== Standings ==
2012 United Conference
	W	L	T	PCT	PF	PA	DIV	GB	STK
y Sioux Falls Storm	14	0	0	1.000	941	563	7-0	---	W14
x Green Bay Blizzard	11	3	0	0.786	787	586	10-3	3.0	W3
x Bloomington Edge	10	4	0	0.714	673	604	10-3	4.0	W1
x Lehigh Valley Steelhawks	6	8	0	0.429	605	615	6-8	8.0	W1
Omaha Beef	6	8	0	0.429	635	696	3-3	4.0	L2
Chicago Slaughter	6	8	0	0.429	657	714	6-8	4.0	L1
Cedar Rapids Titans	4	10	0	0.286	509	631	4-0	10.0	W1
Reading Express	2	12	0	0.143	534	773	7-1	12.0	L5
