= 2012 Reading Express season =

Indoor Football League team season

- Owner: Ted Lavender; Lisa Lavender
- Head coach: Mark Steinmeyer
- Home stadium: Sovereign Center

Results
- Record: 2-12
- Conference place: 8th
- Playoffs: did not qualify

The 2012 Reading Express season was the seventh season as a professional indoor football franchise and their second in the Indoor Football League (IFL). One of 16 teams competing in the IFL for the 2012 season, the Reading Express were members of the United Conference.

The team played their home games under head coach Mark Steinmeyer at the Sovereign Center in Reading, Pennsylvania. The Express earned a 2–12 record, placing 8th in the United Conference, failing to qualify for the postseason.

== Schedule ==
Key: Win Tie Loss Bye

=== Regular season ===
All start times are local to home team

Week	Day	Date	Kickoff	Opponent	Results		Location
Week	Day	Date	Kickoff	Opponent	Score	Record	Location
1	BYE						
2	Sunday	February 26	3:05pm	at Bloomington Edge	L 40-54	0-1	U.S. Cellular Coliseum
3	Friday	March 2	7:00pm	Green Bay Blizzard	L 32-55	0-2	Sovereign Center
4	BYE						
5	Saturday	March 17	7:00pm	at Lehigh Valley Steelhawks	L 53-86	0-3	Stabler Arena
6	Saturday	March 24	7:00pm	Sioux Falls Storm	L 42-75	0-4	Sovereign Center
7	BYE						
8	Friday	April 7	7:00pm	Lehigh Valley Steelhawks	L 41-62	0-5	Sovereign Center
9	Saturday	April 14	7:00pm	Bloomington Edge	L 31-41	0-6	Sovereign Center
10	Saturday	April 21	7:05pm	at Bloomington Edge	L 39-46	0-7	U.S. Cellular Coliseum
11	Saturday	April 28	7:00pm	Cedar Rapids Titans	W 51-47	1-7	Sovereign Center
12	Saturday	May 5	7:00pm	Lehigh Valley Steelhawks	W 37-34	2-7	Sovereign Center
13	Saturday	May 12	7:05pm	at Cedar Rapids Titans	L 27-32	2-8	U.S. Cellular Center
14	Friday	May 18	7:35pm	at Chicago Slaughter	L 50-67	2-9	Sears Centre
15	Saturday	May 26	7:00pm	at Lehigh Valley Steelhawks	L 24-39	2-10	Stabler Arena
16	Saturday	June 2	7:00pm	Chicago Slaughter	L 40-46	2-11	Sovereign Center
17	Friday	June 8	7:35pm	at Green Bay Blizzard	L 27-89	2-12	Resch Center
18	BYE						

== Roster ==
2012 Reading Express roster
Quarterbacks: 9 Tim Bailey; 18 Kevin Clancy; Running backs: 6 Donald Babers; 5 Elliott White; Wide receivers: 7 Jermaine King; 28 Chris Shubert; 3 Keith Stokes	Offensive linemen: 59 Nick Dean; 71 Corey Dowless; 64 Ty Gieser; 68 Frank Toarmina; Defensive linemen: 11 Mike Dell; 8 Anthony Kelly; 77 Michael London; 92 Brandon Perry; 90 Bryan Wick	Linebackers: 48 Kevin Bolinsky; 51 Michael Thompson; Defensive backs: 23 Ivory Bradshaw; 2 Sam Bryant; 14 Geoffrey Howard; 17 George Ortiz; 1 Marcus Sargeant; 15 Trey Womack; Kickers: 25 Eric Rockhold	Injured Reserve: currently vacant; Exempt List: currently vacant; Practice squad: currently vacant; Roster updated June 8, 2012; 25 Active, 0 Inactive, 0 PS → More rosters

== Division Standings ==
2012 United Conference
	W	L	T	PCT	PF	PA	DIV	GB	STK
y Sioux Falls Storm	14	0	0	1.000	941	563	7-0	---	W14
x Green Bay Blizzard	11	3	0	0.786	787	586	10-3	3.0	W3
x Bloomington Edge	10	4	0	0.714	673	604	10-3	4.0	W1
x Lehigh Valley Steelhawks	6	8	0	0.429	605	615	6-8	8.0	W1
Omaha Beef	6	8	0	0.429	635	696	3-3	4.0	L2
Chicago Slaughter	6	8	0	0.429	657	714	6-8	4.0	L1
Cedar Rapids Titans	4	10	0	0.286	509	631	4-0	10.0	W1
Reading Express	2	12	0	0.143	534	773	7-1	12.0	L5
