= 2014 Sioux City Bandits season =

- Owner: Bob Scott
- General manager: Bob Scott
- Head coach: Erv Strohbeen
- Home stadium: Tyson Events Center; 401 Gordon Drive; Sioux City, Iowa 51101

Results
- Record: 9-3
- League place: 2nd
- Playoffs: Won Semi-final (Bombers) 66-37; Lost CPIFL Champions Bowl II (Wild) 46-41

The 2014 Sioux City Bandits season was the team's fifteenth season as a professional indoor football franchise, fourteenth as the Sioux City Bandits and second as a member of Champions Professional Indoor Football League (CPIFL). One of nine teams in the CPIFL, the Bandits finished the regular season 9–3 to earn the number two seed in the playoffs, in which they beat the Salina Bombers, 66–37 in the semifinals, but lost the CPIFL Champions Bowl II, 46–41 to the Wichita Wild.

== Schedule ==
Key: Win Loss Bye

=== Pre-season ===
Week	Day	Date	Kickoff	Opponent	Results		Location	Attendance
Week	Day	Date	Kickoff	Opponent	Score	Record	Location	Attendance
1	Saturday	February 22	7:05pm	Sioux Falls Storm	L 9–24	0–0	Tyson Events Center	N/A

=== Regular season ===
Week	Day	Date	Kickoff	Opponent	Results		Location	Attendance
Week	Day	Date	Kickoff	Opponent	Score	Record	Location	Attendance
1	Sunday	March 2	2:05pm	Salina Bombers	L 70–77 (OT)	0–1	Tyson Events Center	2,317
2	Saturday	March 8	7:05pm	Lincoln Haymakers	W 68–17	1–1	Tyson Events Center	3,970
3	BYE							
4	Saturday	March 22	7:05pm	at Oklahoma Defenders	W 46–33	2–1	Tulsa Convention Center	N/A
5	BYE							
6	Saturday	April 5	7:05pm	Wichita Wild	W 48–45	3–1	Tyson Events Center	3,813
7	Friday	April 11	7:05pm	at Omaha Beef	W 61–55	4–1	Ralston Arena	N/A
8	Saturday	April 19	7:05pm	at Bloomington Edge	L 43–52	4–2	U.S. Cellular Coliseum	N/A
9	Saturday	April 26	7:05pm	at Salina Bombers	W 56–42	5–2	Bicentennial Center	2,253
10	Saturday	May 3	7:05pm	Oklahoma Defenders	W 60–52	6–2	Tyson Events Center	4,851
11	Saturday	May 10	7:05pm	Omaha Beef	W 61–47	7–2	Tyson Events Center	3,956
12	Saturday	May 17	7:05pm	Bloomington Edge	W 63–39	8–2	Tyson Events Center	3,956
13	Saturday	May 24	7:05pm	at Kansas Koyotes	W 72–40	9–2	Landon Arena	N/A
14	Saturday	May 31	7:05pm	at Wichita Wild	L 54–59	9–3	Hartman Arena	2,738
15	BYE							

=== Post-season ===
Round	Day	Date	Kickoff	Opponent	Results		Location	Attendance
Round	Day	Date	Kickoff	Opponent	Score	Record	Location	Attendance
Semi-finals	Saturday	June 14	7:05pm	Salina Bombers	W 66–37	10–3	Tyson Events Center	2,007
CPIFL Champions Bowl II	Saturday	June 21	7:15pm	at Wichita Wild	L 41–46	10–4	Hartman Arena	4,212
