= 2012 Omaha Beef season =

Indoor Football League team season

- Owner: Jeff Sprowls
- General manager: Josh Roehr
- Head coach: Andy Yost & James Kerwin (interim); Bruce Cowdrey (fired on May 3; 3–5 record)
- Home stadium: Omaha Civic Auditorium; 1804 Capitol Avenue; Omaha, NE 68102

Results
- Record: 6-8
- Conference place: 5th
- Playoffs: did not qualify

The 2012 Omaha Beef season was the thirteenth season as a professional indoor football franchise and their fourth in the Indoor Football League (IFL). One of 16 teams competing in the IFL for the 2012 season, the Omaha Beef were members of the United Conference.

The team played their home games under head coach Bruce Cowdrey for the first eight games of the season, before he was replaced by Andy Yost and James Kerwin as co-head coaches, at the Omaha Civic Auditorium in Omaha, Nebraska. The Beef earned a 6-8 record, placing 5th in the United Conference, failing to qualify for the postseason.

== Schedule ==
Key: Win Tie Loss Bye

=== Regular season ===
All start times are local to home team

Week	Day	Date	Kickoff	Opponent	Results		Location
Week	Day	Date	Kickoff	Opponent	Score	Record	Location
1	BYE						
2	BYE						
3	Friday	March 2	7:05pm	Wichita Wild	W 38-35	1-0	Omaha Civic Auditorium
4	Monday	March 12	7:05pm	at Nebraska Danger	L 34-48	1-1	Eihusen Arena
5	Saturday	March 17	7:05pm	Wyoming Cavalry	W54-52	2-1	Omaha Civic Auditorium
6	Saturday	March 24	7:05pm	Green Bay Blizzard	L 37-42	2-2	Omaha Civic Auditorium
7	BYE						
8	Friday	April 6	7:05pm	Wichita Wild	L 47-50	2-3	Omaha Civic Auditorium
9	Friday	April 13	7:05pm	at Wyoming Cavalry	L 60-71	2-4	Casper Events Center
10	Saturday	April 21	7:05pm	at Cedar Rapids Titans	W 50-32	3-4	Cedar Rapids Ice Arena
11	Saturday	April 28	7:05pm	Sioux Falls Storm	L 37-49	3-5	Omaha Civic Auditorium
12	Saturday	May 5	7:05pm	at Wichita Wild	L 41-77	3-6	Hartman Arena
13	Saturday	May 12	7:05pm	Nebraska Danger	W 68-54	4-6	Omaha Civic Auditorium
14	Saturday	May 19	7:05pm	at Lehigh Valley Steelhawks	W 64-44	5-6	Stabler Arena
15	BYE						
16	Friday	June 1	7:05pm	Cedar Rapids Titans	W 51-33	6-6	Omaha Civic Auditorium
17	Saturday	June 9	7:05pm	at Nebraska Danger	L 34-50	6-7	Eihusen Arena
18	Saturday	June 16	7:05pm	at Sioux Falls Storm	L 20-59	6-8	Sioux Falls Arena

== Roster ==
2012 Omaha Beef roster
Quarterbacks: 3 James McNear; 14 Martevious Young; Running backs: 5 Tory Harrison; 32 R. J. Rollins; Wide receivers: 1 Allen Burrell; 20 Judd Harrold; 11 Mike Jones; 17 Duval Kamara	Offensive linemen: 65 Everett Corley; 54 Terry Freeman; 72 Frank Knights; 68 Dan Potmesil; 76 Matt Rahn; Defensive linemen: 99 Terrance Banks; 91 Emeka Nwankwo; 9 Bryan Tarkington; 92 Marques Walton	Linebackers: 10 Leroy Banks; 4 Peter Buck; Defensive backs: 24 Diezeas Calbert; 15 Aldwin Foster-Rettig; 2 Cortney Grixby; 21 Ricardo Kemp; 22 Kwaheem Smith; Kickers: 13 Gary Cismesia	Injured Reserve: currently vacant; Exempt List: currently vacant; Practice squad: currently vacant; Roster updated June 16, 2012; 25 Active, 0 Inactive, 0 PS → More rosters

== Division Standings ==
2012 United Conference
	W	L	T	PCT	PF	PA	DIV	GB	STK
y Sioux Falls Storm	14	0	0	1.000	941	563	7-0	---	W14
x Green Bay Blizzard	11	3	0	0.786	787	586	10-3	3.0	W3
x Bloomington Edge	10	4	0	0.714	673	604	10-3	4.0	W1
x Lehigh Valley Steelhawks	6	8	0	0.429	605	615	6-8	8.0	W1
Omaha Beef	6	8	0	0.429	635	696	3-3	4.0	L2
Chicago Slaughter	6	8	0	0.429	657	714	6-8	4.0	L1
Cedar Rapids Titans	4	10	0	0.286	509	631	4-0	10.0	W1
Reading Express	2	12	0	0.143	534	773	7-1	12.0	L5
