= Cory Ross =

American gridiron football player (born 1982)

Quad City Steamwheelers
- Title: Head coach

Personal information
- Born: September 22, 1982 (age 44); Denver, Colorado, U.S.
- Listed height: 5 ft 6 in (1.68 m)
- Listed weight: 201 lb (91 kg)

Career information
- High school: Thomas Jefferson (Denver)
- College: Nebraska
- NFL draft: 2006: undrafted

Career history

Playing
- Baltimore Ravens (2006–2007); California Redwoods/Sacramento Mountain Lions (2009–2011); Edmonton Eskimos (2012)*; Lincoln Haymakers (2013)
- * Offseason or practice squad member only

Coaching
- Lincoln Haymakers (2013) (Offensive coordinator/interim head coach); Lincoln Haymakers (2014) (Head coach); Omaha Beef (2015–2017); Quad City Steamwheelers (2018–present)

Awards and highlights
- IFL Coach of the Year (2025); Second-team All-Big 12 (2005); 2009 All-UFL Access First Team; 2010 UFL Offensive Season MVP

Career NFL statistics
- Rushing attempts: 12
- Rushing yards: 72
- Rushing touchdowns: 1
- Return yards: 415
- Stats at Pro Football Reference

Cory Ross (born September 22, 1982) is an American former professional football, Canadian football and indoor football running back. He is now the head coach of the Quad City Steamwheelers of the Indoor Football League (IFL). He most recently played for the Edmonton Eskimos of the Canadian Football League (CFL). He was signed by the Baltimore Ravens as an undrafted free agent in 2006. He played college football for the Nebraska Cornhuskers.

== Early life ==
Ross attended Thomas Jefferson High School in Denver, Colorado. While in high school, Ross played in the first ever U.S. Army All-American Bowl game on December 30, 2000, alongside fellow Nebraska Cornhusker Titus Adams.

== Playing career ==
=== College career ===
Ross played college football at Nebraska, where he earned the nickname "Porkchop" because he was significantly heavy for his small stature, weighing more than fellow I-backs who were all at least five inches taller. His 2,743 rushing yards ranked ninth on the team's all-time list. He majored in sociology.

=== Baltimore Ravens ===
Ross signed with the Baltimore Ravens as an undrafted rookie free agent on May 12, 2006. In his rookie season he played in four games. With the injury to B.J. Sams during the 2006 NFL season, Ross became the kick returner for the Baltimore Ravens. He made his NFL debut on December 10 at the Kansas City Chiefs.

In the Ravens' 2007 season finale, Ross rushed for 78 yards and a touchdown against the Pittsburgh Steelers. He was released prior to the 2008 season.

=== Sacramento Mountain Lions ===
After spending the 2008 season out of football, Ross was signed by the California Redwoods of the United Football League on August 18, 2009. For the 2010 season, the Redwoods relocated to Sacramento and were renamed the Sacramento Mountain Lions.

He was named the 2010 UFL Offensive Season MVP.

=== Edmonton Eskimos ===
On May 17, 2012, Ross was signed by the Edmonton Eskimos, but was released during training camp on June 17, 2012.

== Coaching career ==
=== Lincoln Haymakers ===
Ross played indoor football during the 2013 with the Lincoln Haymakers and also doubled as their offensive coordinator. In October 2013, after the 2013 season, Ross was named the head coach of the Lincoln Haymakers. The team ceased operations after the 2014 season with Ross at the helm.

=== Omaha Beef ===
In early January 2015, Ross joined the Omaha Beef of Champions Indoor Football as the team's new head coach.

=== Quad City Steamwheelers ===
On August 16, 2017, Ross was announced as the inaugural head coach of the revived Quad City Steamwheelers that began play in Champions Indoor Football for the 2018 season. The Steamwheelers joined the Indoor Football League for the 2019 season.

=== Head coaching record ===
Team	Year	Regular season					Postseason		
Team	Year	Won	Lost	Win %	Finish	Won	Lost	Win %	Result
LIN	2014	5	7	.417	5th	–	–	–	–
OMA	2015	1	11	.083	9th	–	–	–	–
OMA	2016	7	5	.583	4th	–	–	–	–
OMA	2017	7	5	.583	2nd	2	1	.667	Lost in Champions Bowl III
QUAD	2018	8	4	.667	3rd	0	1	.000	–
QUAD	2019	6	8	.429	7th	–	–	–	–
QUAD	2022	9	7	.563	3rd	2	1	.667	Lost in IFL National Championship
QUAD	2023	9	6	.600	4th	0	1	.000	–
QUAD	2024	8	8	.500	4th	0	1	.000	–
QUAD	2025	11	5	.688	1st	1	1	.500	–
QUAD	2026	5	11	.313	6th	–	–	–	–
Total		76	77	.497		5	6	.455	
