= Clinton Solomon =

American football player (born 1983)

No. 1
- Position: Wide receiver

Personal information
- Born: October 21, 1983 (age 43); Fort Worth, Texas, U.S.
- Listed height: 6 ft 4 in (1.93 m)
- Listed weight: 210 lb (95 kg)

Career information
- High school: Fort Worth (TX) Eastern Hills
- College: Iowa
- NFL draft: 2006: undrafted

Career history
- St. Louis Rams (2006)*; Tennessee Titans (2007)*; Chicago Bears (2007)*; Chicago Rush (2008)*; Wichita Wild (2009–2011); Sioux Falls Storm (2012); Kansas City Renegades (2013); Sioux Falls Storm (2013); Texas Revolution (2014); San Antonio Talons (2014); Nebraska Danger (2015)*; Las Vegas Outlaws (2015); Texas Revolution (2016)
- * Offseason or practice squad member only

Awards and highlights
- 3× First-team All-IFL (2009, 2010, 2014); 2× Second-team All-IFL (2011, 2012); 2× United Bowl champion (2012, 2013); First Team CIF Southern Conference (2017); All-CIF Team (2017); CIF Offensive Player of the Year (2017); CIF champion (2017); Second-team All-Big Ten (2004)

Career AFL statistics
- Receptions: 74
- Receiving yards: 846
- Receiving touchdowns: 16
- Stats at ArenaFan.com

Clinton Solomon (born October 21, 1983) is an American former football wide receiver. Who last played for the Texas Revolution of Champions Indoor Football (CIF). He played college football at the University of Iowa. He is currently the head coach of the ICT Regulators of the Arena Football League (AFL).

== College career ==
Solomon signed to play football for the Iowa Hawkeyes on February 1, 2002. After playing as a freshman, Solomon left Iowa due to his poor grades, and attended Iowa Central Community College during the 2003 school year, where he played for the Tritons. After the school year, Solomon returned to the Hawkeyes. Solomon returned to Iowa with a terrific junior season, earning 2nd Team All-Big Ten Conference honors.

== Professional career ==
=== NFL ===
After going undrafted in the 2006 NFL draft, Solomon signed as an undrafted free agent with the St. Louis Rams. He was released on September 1, 2006. Solomon signed with the Tennessee Titans during the 2007 offseason, but was waived on July 25, 2007. Solomon signed with the Chicago Bears later in September, 2007.

=== Wichita Wild ===
After spending the entire 2008 season on the practice squad of the Chicago Rush, Solomon signed with the Wichita Wild of the Indoor Football League (IFL). Solomon was named 1st Team All-IFL, finishing fourth in both receiving yards (1,008) and receiving touchdowns (22) on the year. Solomon would once again be a 1st Team All-IFL selection in 2010, and a 2nd Team selection in 2011.

=== Sioux Falls Storm ===
Solomon moved on to the Sioux Falls Storm in 2012, helping the Storm win their second IFL Championship. Solomon returned to the Storm in 2013, helping them win their 3rd consecutive title.

=== Texas Revolution ===
Solomon joined the Texas Revolution for the 2014 season.

=== San Antonio Talons ===
Solomon joined the San Antonio Talons of the Arena Football League (AFL), to finish the 2014 season.

=== Las Vegas Outlaws ===
Solomon was assigned to the Las Vegas Outlaws in 2015. He was placed on reassigned on July 28, 2015. On July 30, 2015, he was assigned back with the Outlaws.

=== Return to Texas ===
In February, 2016, Solomon returned to the Texas Revolution. On February 8, 2017, Solomon re-signed with the Revolution.
