= Mathewson Exhibition Center =

Multi-purpose arena in Sedalia, Missouri

James L. Mathewson Exhibition Center
- Interactive map of James L. Mathewson Exhibition Center
- Location: Missouri State Fairgrounds, Sedalia, Missouri 65301
- Coordinates: 38°41′40″N 93°15′42″W
- Owner: Missouri State Fair
- Capacity: 3,155 (5,500 with portable sets)

Construction
- Opened: 1988
- Cost: $7.6 million

Tenant
- Mid-Missouri Outlaws (APFL/CPIFL) (2010–2013)

The James L. Mathewson Exhibition Center is a publicly owned 3,155-seat multi-purpose arena on the Missouri State Fairgrounds in Sedalia, Missouri. Built in 1988, it received its current name in 1994 to honor Missouri Senator James L. Mathewson, who was instrumental in getting support for the State Fair to the General Assembly.

During the Fair, the Mathewson Exhibition Center hosts equine and livestock shows as well as various entertainment and concerts. During the offseason, it was home to the Mid-Missouri Outlaws of the Champions Professional Indoor Football League.
