= United Wireless Arena =

Multi-purpose venue in Dodge City, Kansas

- Location within Kansas Location within the United States
- Former names: Dodge City/Ford County Events Center (planning/construction)
- Location: 4100 W Comanche St; Dodge City, KS 67801-8109
- Coordinates: 37°45′59″N 100°03′46″W
- Owner: City of Dodge City & Ford County
- Operator: VenuWorks
- Capacity: 5,300

Construction
- Groundbreaking: October 27, 2009
- Opened: February 17, 2011
- Cost: $41.5 million
- Architect: Sink Combs Dethlefs
- Project manager: International Coliseums Company
- General contractor: JE Dunn Construction

Tenants
- Dodge City Law (CPIFL/CIF) (2014–17; 2021); Southwest Kansas Storm (CIF/AFL/AF1/NAL) (2022–present)

The United Wireless Arena is a multi-purpose venue in Dodge City, Kansas. The arena sits adjacent to the Boot Hill Casino and is connected to the Boot Hill Casino & Resort Conference Center. The United Wireless Arena and the Boot Hill Casino & Resort Conference Center are both managed by VenuWorks.

It was originally known as the "Dodge City/Ford County Events Center" before United Wireless purchased the naming rights to the facility in 2010.

The conference center is one large space (7,200 sq feet) that can be subdivided into six separate areas. The arena has a seating capacity of 5,300 spectators.

The arena became home to the Dodge City Law of the Champions Indoor Football (CIF) league from 2014 until 2017. The Law were resurrected for the 2021 season after the Oklahoma Flying Aces withdrew one week before the season start by using the Flying Aces roster and staff. The CIF then granted an expansion team to Dodge City for the following season called the Southwest Kansas Storm (now of the National Arena League). The arena hosts sporting events (KSHSAA volleyball and basketball tournaments, NJCAA basketball playoffs, MMA wrestling matches) along with music concerts, comedians, beauty pageants, other traveling events.

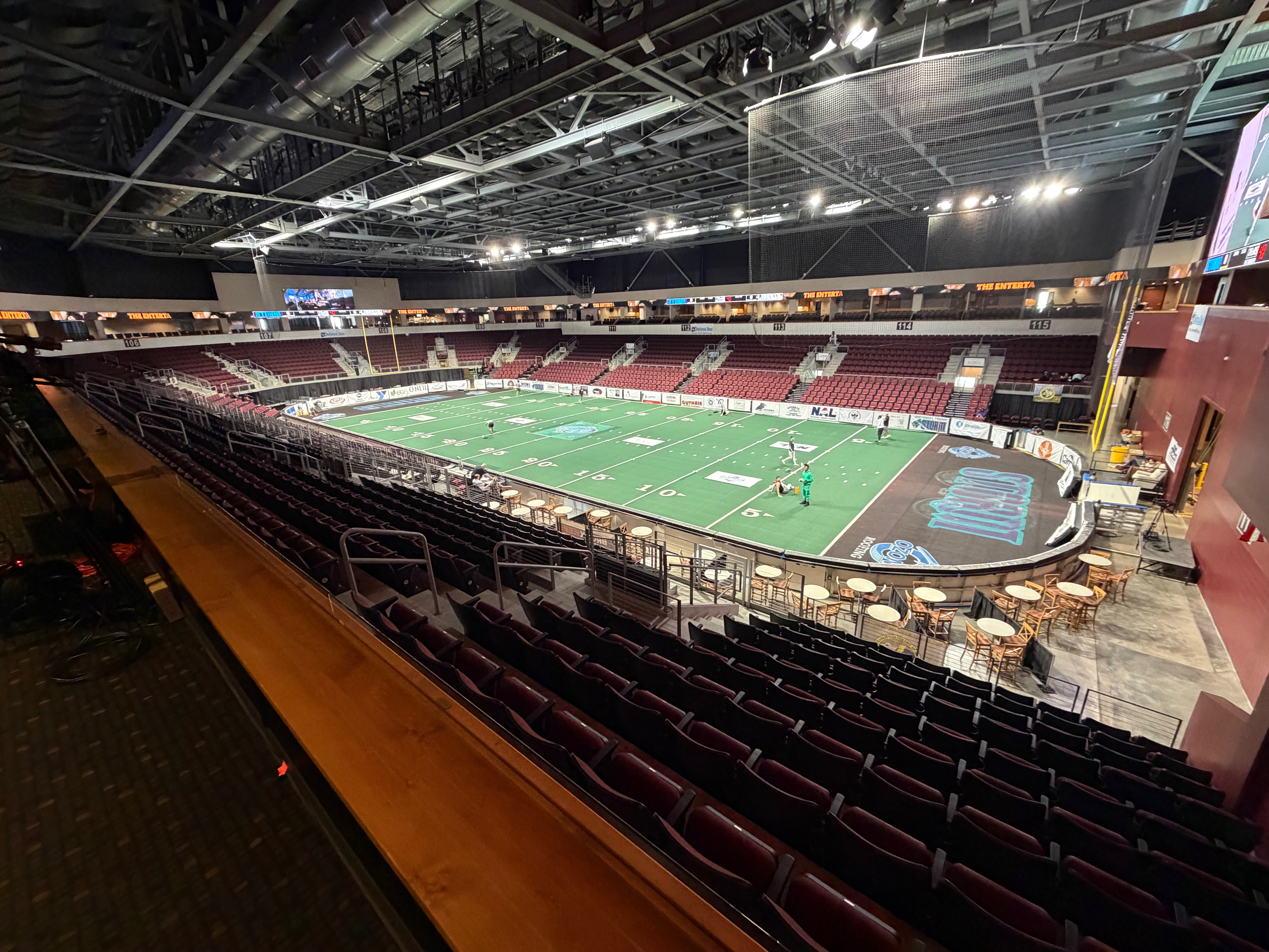
The interior of United Wireless Arena in football configuration just prior to the 2026 National Arena League Championship Game on June 21, 2026.

Every winter, United Wireless Arena freezes the arena floor for public ice skating and for local hockey leagues to practice on. It takes over 10,000 gallons of water to create one-inch of ice and over four days of full-time labor for four people to install the ice. The subfloor is lowered to 16 degrees (F) and the air temperature is below 58 degrees (F) to maintain the ice floor.
