= CenTex Cavalry =

- Founded: 2016
- Folded: 2017
- League: CIF (2017)
- Conference: South
- Team history: CenTex Cavalry (2017)
- Based in: Belton, Texas
- Arena: Bell County Expo Center
- Colors: Red, blue & silver
- Owner: Randy Sanders; Sue Sanders; Josh Sanders
- Head coach: Adrian Perez
- General manager: Rick Graham

The CenTex Cavalry were an indoor American football team that played in the 2017 season as a member of Champions Indoor Football (CIF). Based in Belton, Texas, the Cavalry played their home games at the Bell County Expo Center.

The Cavalry was the third indoor football team to call Belton home, following the Texas Bullets who played in the original Professional Indoor Football League for its only season of 1998 and the CenTex Barracudas who played in the Intense Football League from 2006 until its dissolution in 2008.

== History ==
At the end of the 2016 season, Champions Indoor Football commissioner Randy Sanders folded his team, the San Angelo Bandits. On August 5, 2016, Sanders announced his expansion team in Belton called the CenTex Fightin' Cavalry, along with staff members Tim White and Ronald Oswalt. An official press conference took place on August 11 with Sanders and the name was changed to the CenTex Cavalry. On September 8, Michael Finney was announced as the franchise's first head coach but would be released after only two games. He was replaced by assistant coach Adrian Perez.

After one winless season, Sanders shut down the team with an announcement over social media.

== Season-by-season results ==
League champions	Conference champions	Division champions	Playoff berth	League leader

Season	Team	League	Conference	Division	Regular season				Postseason results
Season	Team	League	Conference	Division	Finish	Wins	Losses	Ties	Postseason results
2017	2017	CIF	South		7th	0	12	0	
Totals						0	12	0	All-time record (2017)
