= Bloomington Edge =

Indoor football team in Bloomington, Illinois

Logo

General information
- Founded: 2005
- Folded: 2019
- Headquartered: Grossinger Motors Arena in Bloomington, Illinois
- Colors: Navy blue, red, silver, white
- Mascot: Spike
- www.bloomingtonedge.net

Personnel
- Owner: Sports Group Illinois
- CEO: Omar Khokhar
- General manager: Charles Welde
- Head coach: John Johnson

Team history
- Bloomington Extreme (2006–2011); Bloomington Edge (2012–2018)

Home fields
- Grossinger Motors Arena (2006–2018)

League / conference affiliations
- United Indoor Football (2006–2008); Central Division (2006); Eastern Division (2007–2008); Indoor Football League (2009–2012); United Conference (2009–2012); Central North Division (2010); Great Lakes Division (2011); Champions Professional Indoor Football League (2013–2014); X-League Indoor Football (2015); Champions Indoor Football (2016–2017); Northern Division (2016); North Conference (2017); Independent (2018)

Championships
- Conference championships: 1: 2008

Playoff appearances (8)
- 2007, 2008, 2009, 2010, 2011, 2012, 2016, 2017

The Bloomington Edge was a professional indoor football team based in Bloomington, Illinois. While it was in operation, the team hosted home games at Grossinger Motors Arena. Originally named the Bloomington Extreme, the team was a member of United Indoor Football (UIF), and joined the Indoor Football League (IFL) in 2009 during the UIF and Intense Football League merger. They left the IFL for the Champions Professional Indoor Football League (CPIFL) in 2013, and in 2015 the CPIFL merged with the Lone Star Football League (LSFL) to create Champions Indoor Football (CIF), where Bloomington did not follow and joined X-League Indoor Football (X-League). Following the 2015 season the Edge joined the CIF. The Edge then announced it had rejoined the IFL for the 2018 season, but a court ruling prevented the team from joining the league until 2019, however, they were not included in that season's schedule.

== Franchise history ==
=== United Indoor Football: 2006–2008 ===
The Bloomington Extreme began as an expansion team in United Indoor Football in 2006 led by head coach Ted Schmitz. They missed the playoffs in their first season, but improved to an 8–7 record in 2007 before losing to the Lexington Horsemen in the Eastern Conference championship. Schmitz was then named an assistant general manager and Kenton Carr was hired as head coach for 2008. The Extreme went 7–7, but were first place in a weak Eastern Conference. They won their first conference title and went on to the United Bowl where they lost to the Sioux Falls Storm.

The UIF merged with the Intense Football League in the 2008 offseason to create new Indoor Football League (IFL) in 2009.

=== Indoor Football League: 2009–2012 ===
The Extreme were added to the United Conference following the merger. The Extreme signed former Florida State and NFL wide receiver Peter Warrick signed a one-year contract. The team went 10–4 and lost in the first round of the playoffs to the Wichita Wild. In the 2010 season, the Extreme started with a 3–5 record and fired head coach Kenton Carr. The team then finished the rest of the season undefeated under former coach Ted Schmitz before losing to Wichita again in the first round of the playoffs. In October 2010, team owner Ed Brady announced that Mike Murray was hired as the team's new head coach for the 2011 Bloomington Extreme season. Murray had been the Extreme offensive coordinator in 2006. The Extreme went 9–5 and lost to the Omaha Beef in the first round of the playoffs.

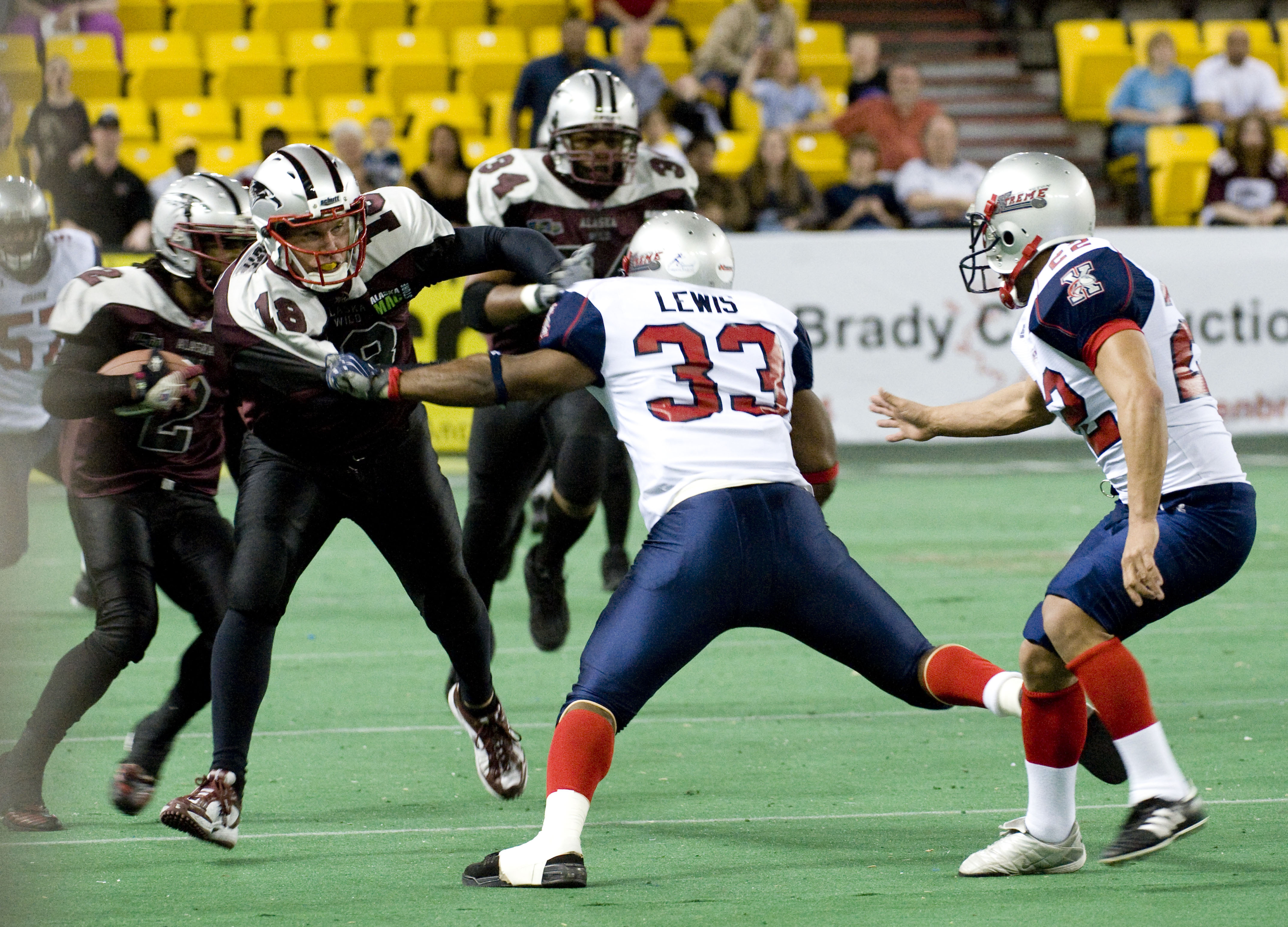
The Extreme against the Alaska Wild in 2009

In November 2011, the team was purchased by Jim Morris, who had been a minority owner of the team. The team agreed with change the name of the franchise to the Bloomington Edge as a tie-in to the Ford Edge. Morris hired Kenton Carr as the head coach for the 2012 Bloomington Edge season. The Edge finished the regular season 10–4, earning the third seed in the United Conference playoffs. The Edge then ended with another first round loss in the playoffs the Green Bay Blizzard, 30–51.

=== Champions Professional Indoor Football League: 2013–2014 ===
For the 2013 Bloomington Edge season, the team was owned by Bloomington Blaze owner Sandra Hunnewell and played in the Champions Professional Indoor Football League (CPIFL). The new ownership retained coach Carr and the team missed the playoffs for the first time since their inaugural season.

Just 12 days after the conclusion of the 2013 season, Edge owner and team president, David Holt and head coach Kenton Carr mutually agreed to part ways. Holt replaced Carr with John Johnson, who had been the team's offensive coordinator under Carr. Under Johnson for the 2014 Bloomington Edge season, the team went 5–7 and still missed the playoffs.

=== X-League: 2015 ===
The Edge announced they were joining X-League Indoor Football in October 2014. The Edge were acquired by Omar Khokhar at the end of the 2015 season. The team's season was abruptly ended and the league's X Bowl II championship game advanced to June 6 after the Cape Fear Heroes were suspended by the league.

=== Champions Indoor Football: 2016–2017 ===
On August 19, 2015, the Edge announced that they were moving to Champions Indoor Football (CIF). The Edge returned to the postseason for the first time in four seasons, going 7–5. The Edge won their first round playoff game against the Sioux City Bandits 65–45, but lost in the North Division Championship 51–52 to the Wichita Force.

On September 9, 2016, it was announced that head coach John Johnson and the Edge had mutually agreed to part ways. On September 13, 2016, the Edge announced that former Extreme linebacker and Spokane Empire defensive coordinator, Ameer Ismail was named the team's new head coach. Ismail lead the Edge to another 7–5 season, clinching another playoff berth. The Edge lost 30–43 to the Omaha Beef. Twelve days later, Ismail and the Edge agreed to part ways citing "different visions."

=== League issues and hiatus ===
On August 23, 2017, Nick Ruud was named the next Edge head coach. On September 12, 2017, the Edge announced that they were moving back to the Indoor Football League.

However, the CIF then attempted to sue the IFL and the Edge for leaving the CIF after the Edge had already signed league affiliation agreements with the CIF for 2018. While the CIF did drop the lawsuit against the IFL due to legal retaliation, it filed for an injunction against the Edge from participating in the IFL for breaking the terms of their signed affiliation agreement. A temporary injunction from participation was granted on January 31, 2018, with the court ruling determining that the Edge had been in violation of their CIF league affiliation agreement.

On February 6, the Edge announced that it would continue to operate independently of a league for the season. In the same press release, the Edge also announced that John Johnson would return as head coach. However, the court ruling prevented the Edge from playing any games during the spring of 2018 as long as the CIF season length, forcing the Edge to only schedule exhibition games during the summer. After their summer season, Edge owner Omar Khokhar announced the franchise was for sale and could relocate.

In 2019, the Wells Sports Group signed a letter of intent to purchase the Edge franchise. On October 22, 2019, they announced their intentions to join the American Arena League (AAL) for the 2020 season and were still in negotiations with Grossinger Motors Arena for a lease. However, the arena instead agreed to a lease with the semiprofessional indoor football team, Midway Marauders, as the Marauders had been in negotiations with the arena before Wells had initiated any conversations, thereby halting the sale of the franchise.

== Logos and uniforms ==
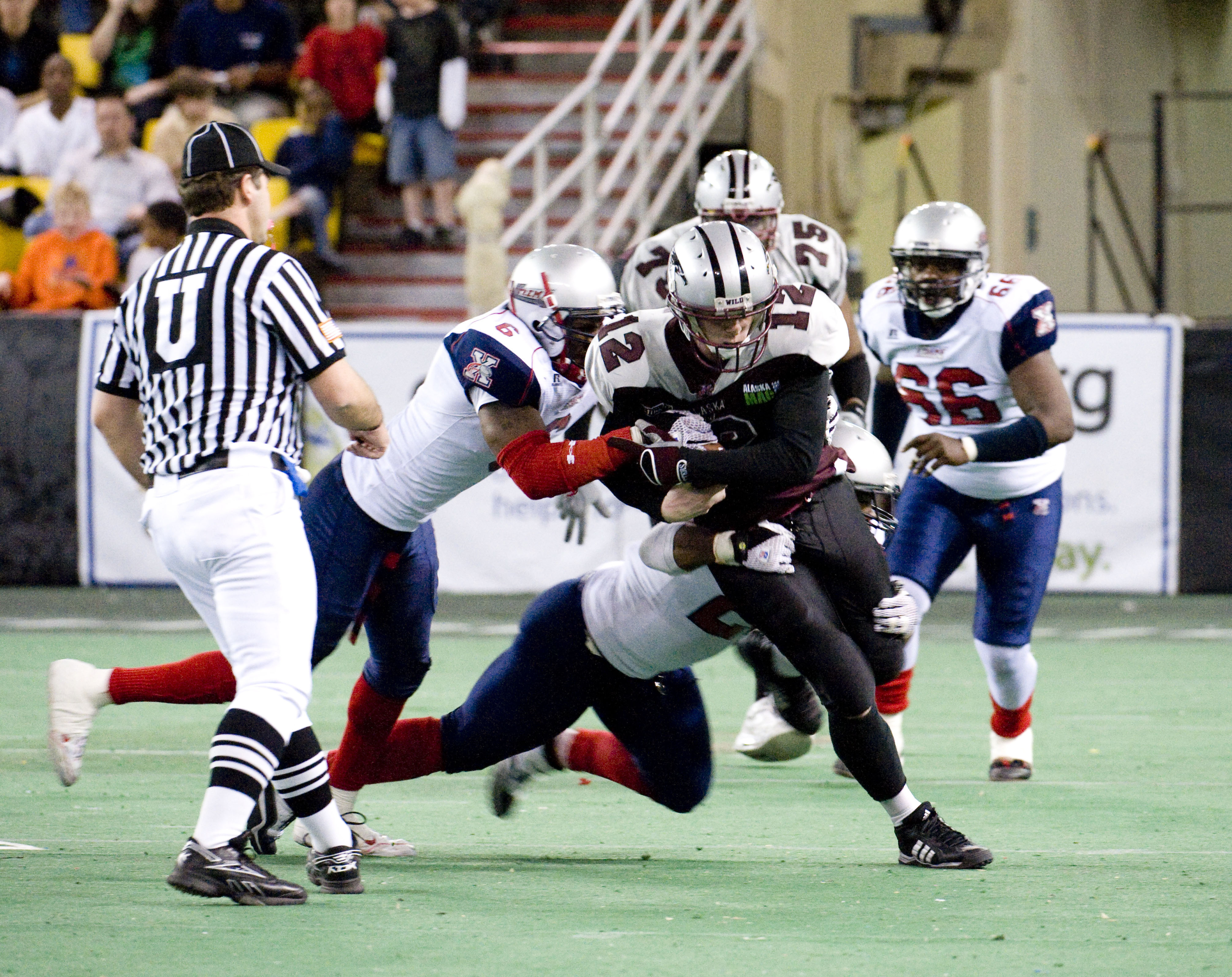
The Extreme in a game against the Alaska Wild in May 2009.

From the team's inception until 2011, the team was known as the Bloomington Extreme, with the having been derived from a naming rights deal with local auto dealer Extreme Motors. In the 2011–12 offseason, the team was sold to Jim Morris (owner of a local Sonic Drive-In franchise and of the Premier Basketball League's Central Illinois Drive), with a naming rights deal with another auto dealer; this time Heller Ford would acquire said rights, giving the team its new Edge nickname (derived from the Ford Edge automobile).

== Season-by-season results ==
League champions	Conference champions	Division champions	Playoff berth	League leader

Season	Team	League	Conference	Division	Regular season			Postseason results
Season	Team	League	Conference	Division	Finish	Wins	Losses	Postseason results
2006	2006	UIF		Central	2nd	5	10	
2007	2007	UIF		Eastern	4th	8	7	Won Round 1 (Rock River) 43–30; Lost Divisional Championship (Lexington) 49–67
2008	2008	UIF		Eastern	1st	7	7	Won Divisional Finals (River City) 57–23; Lost United Bowl IV (Sioux Falls) 35–40
2009	2009	IFL	United	Central	2nd	10	4	Lost Divisional Round 1 (Wichita) 37–46
2010	2010	IFL	United	Central North	2nd	9	5	Lost Round 1 (Wichita) 48–61
2011	2011	IFL	United	Great Lakes	3rd	9	5	Lost Round 1 (Omaha) 34–39
2012	2012	IFL	United		3rd	10	4	Lost United Conference Semifinal (Green Bay) 30–51
2013	2013	CPIFL			6th	5	7	
2014	2014	CPIFL			6th	5	7	
2015	2015	X-League			5th	5	3	
2016	2016	CIF		Northern	2nd	7	5	Won Northern Round 1 (Sioux City) 65–45; Lost Division Championship (Wichita) 51–52
2017	2017	CIF	Northern		3rd	7	5	Lost Northern Conference Semifinal (Omaha) 30–43
Totals						87	69	All-time regular season record
Totals						3	8	All-time postseason record
Totals						90	77	All-time regular season and postseason record

== Players ==
=== All-League selections ===
- DL Sean Kelly (1), Antonio Fickin (2), Jeff Sobol (1)
- LB Ameer Ismail
- DB LaRoche Jackson (1), James Temple (2), Vincent Joseph (1)
- K Peter Christofilakos (4)
