= 2005 Kansas City Chiefs season =

46th season in franchise history; final full season with Lamar Hunt

- Owner: Lamar Hunt
- General manager: Carl Peterson
- Head coach: Dick Vermeil
- Home stadium: Arrowhead Stadium

Results
- Record: 10–6
- Division place: 2nd AFC West
- Playoffs: Did not qualify
- All-Pros: 4: RB Larry Johnson (2nd team); OT Willie Roaf (2nd team); G Will Shields (2nd team); G Brian Waters (1st team)
- Pro Bowlers: 6: QB Trent Green; RB Larry Johnson; TE Tony Gonzalez; OT Willie Roaf; G Will Shields; G Brian Waters

Uniform
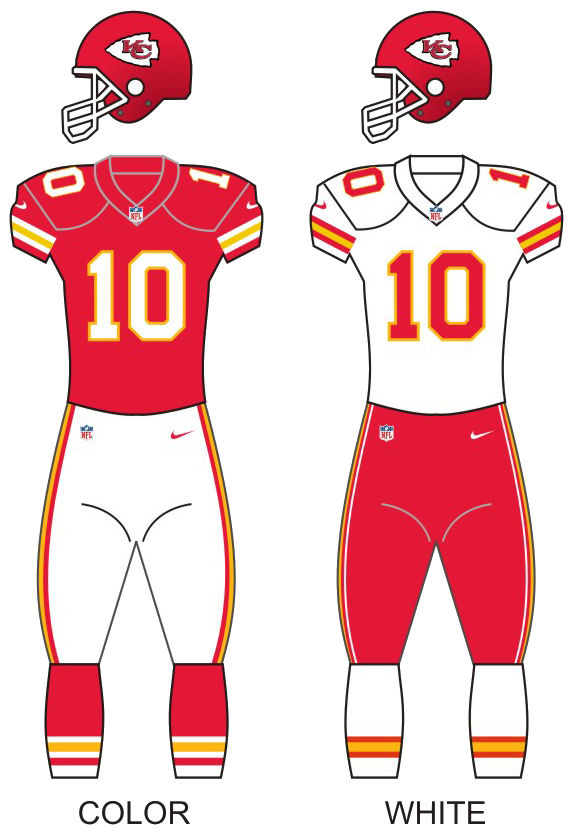

The 2005 season was the Kansas City Chiefs' 36th in the National Football League (NFL), their 46th overall, and their fifth and final season under head coach Dick Vermeil.

The team improved on their 7–9 record from 2004 to a decent 10–6 record, but missed the playoffs for the second consecutive season. The Chiefs became the sixth 10–6 team to fail to qualify for the playoffs since the NFL introduced the wild card.

The Chiefs drafted Derrick Johnson and Dustin Colquitt in the 2005 NFL draft. Both players would eventually become fan favorites. Johnson would play for the Chiefs until 2017 and Colquitt would play for the team until their Super Bowl championship season in 2019.

The final season of head coach Dick Vermeil was a swan song for one of the NFL's most prolific offensive squads in years, and the breakout season of running back Larry Johnson, who finished the season with 1,750 rushing yards in only nine starts. After running back Priest Holmes was injured in week 8 against the San Diego Chargers, Johnson took over the reins of the Chiefs’ offense and it almost resulted in a playoff berth.

For the 2005 campaign, the Chiefs brought several new players to boost a defense that has finished among the worst units the past three years. Starting with first draft pick, linebacker Derrick Johnson from the University of Texas, free agent linebacker Kendrell Bell, free agent safety Sammy Knight, and also trading for cornerback Patrick Surtain from the Miami Dolphins for a second-round draft pick, the Chiefs had high hopes for the 2005 season.

== Season summary ==
The Chiefs got off to a 2–0 start, by beating the New York Jets and then went on the road to beat their division rival Oakland Raiders. However, they then lost at Invesco Field at Mile High 30–10 to the Denver Broncos, another division rival. Then in Week 4, the Chiefs hosted the Philadelphia Eagles. Kansas City got off to a fast start and led 24–13 at halftime. However, the Eagles managed to come back and beat the Chiefs, the latter of which would lose the game, 37–31. The Chiefs used their Bye Week in Week 5 to regroup, and managed to win at home against the Washington Redskins, 28–21.

The Chiefs had little time to celebrate because they were informed that because Hurricane Wilma was going to impact Miami on Sunday; they would have to face the Dolphins two days earlier. Despite the sudden change of the schedule, the Chiefs managed to win against the Miami Dolphins 30–20. However, despite having over a week to prepare, they couldn't defeat the San Diego Chargers on the road and lost 28–20. The Chiefs would rebound at home and win a well-fought rematch with their arch-rivals, the Oakland Raiders, with a final of 27–23 on a dramatic game ending touchdown run. However, the Chiefs' next game would not fare as well, as they ended losing the Buffalo Bills, despite outgaining them in yards from scrimmage.

Running back Priest Holmes was injured in the Week 8 matchup against the Chargers. Holmes was injured by Chargers rookie linebacker Shawne Merriman and suffered severe head and neck trauma. Larry Johnson entered the game and claimed the starting position for the remainder of the season, an event which would eventually lead to Johnson's selection in the 2006 Pro Bowl.

The Chiefs would then proceed to start a three-game winning streak going. First, they would beat the 1–8 Houston Texans on Sunday night and then they would win back-to-back home games against the two-time defending champion New England Patriots and then a win over the Denver Broncos. In the following weeks, the Chiefs had a huge disadvantage with back-to-back interconference road losses to the Dallas Cowboys and the New York Giants.

Chiefs owner Lamar Hunt was honored before the Week 14 game against the Dallas Cowboys and had the honors of the pre-game coin-flip. Hunt was recognized for his contributions to the City of Dallas, and his establishment of the American Football League's Dallas Texans (now the Kansas City Chiefs), one of the Cowboys’ AFL rivals.

The Chiefs were able to keep their playoff hopes alive after a 20–7 home victory over the Chargers in week 16.

In week 17, the Chiefs needed a Pittsburgh Steelers loss to the Detroit Lions, a Chargers loss or tie to the Broncos, and a victory against the Cincinnati Bengals to reach the playoffs. On December 31, 2005, Dick Vermeil announced at a team meeting of his intention to retire following the season. The news leaked out of the team meeting and national news sources soon began reporting it. The following day, the Chiefs soundly defeated the Bengals, who had already clinched a playoff berth, by a final score of 37–3. With the clock winding down on the game and potentially Vermeil's coaching career, Vermeil was met with enormous applause and chants of "one more year." Vermeil received a Gatorade bath from Jared Allen and Lional Dalton to commemorate both his last game at Arrowhead Stadium and final regular season game; however, it also turned out to be his final game as the Steelers won over the Lions 35–21, taking AFC Wild Card #2 and thereby ending the Chiefs season. The Steelers eventually won Super Bowl XL, becoming the first sixth-seeded team to play in and win the Super Bowl.

== Offseason ==
=== Speculation on Dick Vermeil's future ===
Speculation was heavy over the future of coach Dick Vermeil's job in Kansas City for the 2006 season. Vermeil initially signed on with the Chiefs for three years, but was entering his fifth. The 69-year-old Vermeil entered the season as the oldest current head coach in the NFL.

=== Free agents ===
The Chiefs attempted to bulk up their weak defense with veteran free agents who have proven themselves in the past. With the acquisitions of Kendrell Bell, Sammy Knight, and Patrick Surtain, the Chiefs had high hopes for the 2005 season.

=== Draft ===
2005 Kansas City Chiefs draft
| Round | Selection | Player | Position | College |
|---|---|---|---|---|
| 1 | 15 | Derrick Johnson | Linebacker | Texas |
| 3 | 99 | Dustin Colquitt | Punter | Tennessee |
| 4 | 116 | Craphonso Thorpe | Wide receiver | Florida State |
| 5 | 138 | Boomer Grigsby | Linebacker | Illinois State |
| 5 | 147 | Alphonso Hodge | Cornerback | Miami (OH) |
| 6 | 187 | Will Svitek | Offensive tackle | Stanford |
| 6 | 199 | Khari Long | Defensive end | Baylor |
| 7 | 229 | James Kilian | Quarterback | Tulsa |
| 7 | 238 | Jeremy Parquet | Offensive tackle | Southern Miss |

== Staff ==
2005 Kansas City Chiefs staff
| Front office: Founder – Lamar Hunt; President/general manager/chief executive officer – Carl Peterson; Chairman of the board – Jack Steadman; Vice chairman of the board – Clark Hunt; Executive vice president/assistant general manager – Dennis Thum; Vice president of football operations/player personnel – Lynn Stiles; Director of football administration – Mike White; Director of pro personnel – Bill Kuharich; Head coaches: Head coach – Dick Vermeil; Assistant head coach/offensive coordinator – Al Saunders; Offensive coaches: Quarterbacks – Terry Shea; Running backs – James Saxon; Wide receivers – Charlie Joiner; Tight ends – Jason Verduzco; Offensive line – Mike Solari; Assistant offensive line – Irv Eatman; Offensive quality control – Bob Saunders | Defensive coaches: Defensive coordinator – Gunther Cunningham; Defensive line – Carl Hairston; Defensive line – Bob Karmelowicz; Linebackers – Fred Pagac; Defensive backs – Peter Giunta; Defensive assistant/quality control – Darvin Wallis; Special teams coaches: Special teams – Frank Gansz Jr; Assistant special teams – Chad O'Shea; Strength and conditioning: Strength and conditioning – Jeff Hurd; Assistant strength and conditioning – Billy Long |

== Roster ==
2005 Kansas City Chiefs roster
| Quarterbacks (QB): 15 Todd Collins; 10 Trent Green; 11 Damon Huard; Running backs (RB): 39 Dee Brown; 42 Ronnie Cruz FB; 27 Larry Johnson; 49 Tony Richardson FB; Wide receivers (WR): 85 Marc Boerigter; 82 Dante Hall; 81 Chris Horn; 87 Eddie Kennison; 18 Samie Parker; 12 Craphonso Thorpe; Tight ends (TE): 89 Jason Dunn; 88 Tony Gonzalez | Offensive linemen (OL): 65 Jordan Black OT; 67 Chris Bober C; 72 Jeremy Parquet OT; 77 Willie Roaf OT; 79 Kevin Sampson OT; 68 Will Shields G; 71 Will Svitek G; 54 Brian Waters G; 76 John Welbourn OT; 62 Casey Wiegmann C; Defensive linemen (DL): 69 Jared Allen DE; 93 John Browning DT; 75 Lional Dalton DT; 92 Carlos Hall DE; 98 Eric Hicks DE; 94 Junior Siavii DT; 90 Ryan Sims DT; 55 Gary Stills DE; 96 Jimmy Wilkerson DE | Linebackers (LB): 59 Shawn Barber OLB; 99 Kendrell Bell OLB; 51 Boomer Grigsby MLB; 56 Derrick Johnson OLB; 50 Kawika Mitchell MLB; 91 Rich Scanlon OLB; Defensive backs (DB): 24 William Bartee CB; 47 Alphonso Hodge CB; 29 Sammy Knight SS; 22 Dexter McCleon CB; 20 Benny Sapp CB; 23 Patrick Surtain CB; 44 Eric Warfield CB; 30 Dewayne Washington CB; 25 Greg Wesley FS; 21 Jerome Woods FS; Special teams (ST): 2 Dustin Colquitt P; 48 Ed Perry LS; 1 Lawrence Tynes K | Practice squad: 41 Scott Connot S; -- Aaron Golliday TE; -- Peter Heyer G; 66 Johnathan Ingram C; 95 Khari Long DE; 14 Jeris McIntyre WR; -- Jonathan Smith RB; -- Zach Ville DE; Reserve: 26 Julian Battle CB (IR); 97 Keyaron Fox OLB (IR); 83 Kendall Gammon LS (IR); 53 Kris Griffin OLB (IR); 31 Priest Holmes RB (IR); 84 Kris Wilson TE (IR); Rookies in italics 53 active, 6 reserve, 8 practice squad |

== Preseason ==
=== Schedule ===
| Week | Date | Opponent | Result | Record | Venue | Recap |
|---|---|---|---|---|---|---|
| 1 | August 12 | at Minnesota Vikings | L 16–27 | 0–1 | Hubert H. Humphrey Metrodome | Recap |
| 2 | August 20 | Arizona Cardinals | L 17–24 | 0–2 | Arrowhead Stadium | Recap |
| 3 | August 27 | Seattle Seahawks | L 17–23 | 0–3 | Arrowhead Stadium | Recap |
| 4 | September 2 | at St. Louis Rams | L 23–27 | 0–4 | Edward Jones Dome | Recap |

=== Game summaries ===
==== Week 1: at Minnesota Vikings ====
Week 1: Kansas City Chiefs at Minnesota Vikings – Game summary

| Quarter | 1 | 2 | 3 | 4 | Total |
|---|---|---|---|---|---|
| Chiefs | 3 | 0 | 6 | 7 | 16 |
| Vikings | 7 | 13 | 0 | 7 | 27 |

at Hubert H. Humphrey Metrodome, Minneapolis, Minnesota

- Date: August 12
- Game time: 7:00 p.m. CDT
- Game weather: None (indoor stadium)
- Game attendance: 63,621
- Referee: Ron Winter
- Recap, Game Book

Game information

First quarter

- MIN – Nate Burleson 33-yard pass from Daunte Culpepper (Aaron Elling kick), 11:52. Vikings 7–0. Drive: 6 plays, 65 yards, 3:08.
- KC – Lawrence Tynes 19-yard field goal, 3:14. Vikings 7–3. Drive: 9 plays, 54 yards, 4:11.

Second quarter

- MIN – Mewelde Moore 7-yard pass from Brad Johnson (Paul Edinger kick), 7:00. Vikings 14–3. Drive: 8 plays, 72 yards, 4:25.
- MIN – Aaron Elling 40-yard field goal, 1:43. Vikings 17–3. Drive: 7 plays, 57 yards, 2:33.
- MIN – Paul Edinger 48-yard field goal, 0:01. Vikings 20–3. Drive: 5 plays, 35 yards, 0:32.

Third quarter

- KC – Lawrence Tynes 29-yard field goal, 9:40. Vikings 20–6. Drive: 12 plays, 68 yards, 5:20.
- KC – Lawrence Tynes 51-yard field goal, 2:27. Vikings 20–9. Drive: 7 plays, 4 yards, 4:07.

Fourth quarter

- MIN – Ciatrick Fason 1-yard run (Aaron Elling kick), 6:37. Vikings 27–9. Drive: 15 plays, 77 yards, 8:11.
- KC – James Kilian 3-yard run (Lawrence Tynes kick), 0:29. Vikings 27–16. Drive: 11 plays, 82 yards, 2:07.

Top passers

- KC – Damon Huard – 14/26, 125 yards, INT
- MIN – Brad Johnson – 9/12, 87 yards, TD

Top rushers

- KC – Priest Holmes – 4 rushes, 42 yards
- MIN – Mewelde Moore – 5 rushes, 62 yards

Top receivers

- KC – Richard Smith – 3 receptions, 36 yards
- MIN – Ryan Hoag – 5 receptions, 63 yards

==== Week 2: vs. Arizona Cardinals ====
Week 2: Arizona Cardinals at Kansas City Chiefs – Game summary

| Quarter | 1 | 2 | 3 | 4 | Total |
|---|---|---|---|---|---|
| Cardinals | 0 | 0 | 17 | 7 | 24 |
| Chiefs | 10 | 0 | 0 | 7 | 17 |

at Arrowhead Stadium, Kansas City, Missouri

- Date: August 20
- Game time: 7:30 p.m. CDT
- Game weather: Overcast, 80 °F (27 °C)
- Game attendance: 76,173
- Referee: Pete Morelli
- Recap, Game Book

Game information

First quarter

- KC – Samie Parker 8-yard pass from Trent Green (Lawrence Tynes kick), 10:32. Chiefs 7–0. Drive: 7 plays, 74 yards, 3:04.
- KC – Lawrence Tynes 31-yard field goal, 4:26. Chiefs 10–0. Drive: 6 plays, 42 yards, 2:37.

Second quarter

- No scoring plays.

Third quarter

- ARI – Neil Rackers 27-yard field goal, 12:10. Chiefs 10–3. Drive: 6 plays, 32 yards, 1:52.
- ARI – Eric Green 27-yard interception return (Neil Rackers kick), 11:56. Tied 10–10.
- ARI – Charles Lee 19-yard pass from Josh McCown (Neil Rackers kick), 0:40. Cardinals 17–10. Drive: 10 plays, 64 yards, 5:29.

Fourth quarter

- ARI – Reggie Newhouse 5-yard pass from Josh McCown (Neil Rackers kick), 12:13. Cardinals 24–10. Drive: 5 plays, 21 yards, 2:36.
- KC – John Booth 5-yard pass from James Kilian (Lawrence Tynes kick), 4:28. Cardinals 24–17. Drive: 8 plays, 57 yards, 2:16.

Top passers

- ARI – Kurt Warner – 12/23, 99 yards
- KC – James Kilian – 5/20, 74 yards, TD, INT

Top rushers

- ARI – Marcel Shipp – 7 rushes, 56 yards
- KC – Larry Johnson – 9 rushes, 49 yards

Top receivers

- ARI – Charles Lee – 3 receptions, 37 yards, TD
- KC – John Booth – 2 receptions, 52 yards

==== Week 3: vs. Seattle Seahawks ====
Week 3: Seattle Seahawks at Kansas City Chiefs – Game summary

| Quarter | 1 | 2 | 3 | 4 | Total |
|---|---|---|---|---|---|
| Seahawks | 7 | 3 | 10 | 3 | 23 |
| Chiefs | 7 | 7 | 0 | 3 | 17 |

at Arrowhead Stadium, Kansas City, Missouri

- Date: August 27
- Game time: 7:30 p.m. CDT
- Game weather: Fair, 87 °F (31 °C)
- Game attendance: 74,158
- Referee: Larry Nemmers
- Recap, Game Book

Game information

First quarter

- KC – Tony Gonzalez 4-yard pass from Trent Green (Lawrence Tynes kick), 11:14. Chiefs 7–0. Drive: 8 plays, 80 yards, 3:46.
- SEA – Darrell Jackson 36-yard pass from Matt Hasselbeck (Josh Brown kick), 0:03. Tied 7–7. Drive: 3 plays, 55 yards, 1:03.

Second quarter

- KC – Larry Johnson 97-yard run (Lawrence Tynes kick), 5:53. Chiefs 14–7. Drive: 1 play, 97 yards, 0:12.
- SEA – Josh Brown 22-yard field goal, 0:00. Chiefs 14–10. Drive: 14 plays, 72 yards, 5:53.

Third quarter

- SEA – Shaun Alexander 8-yard pass from Matt Hasselbeck (Josh Brown kick), 10:27. Seahawks 17–14. Drive: 10 plays, 72 yards, 4:33.
- SEA – Josh Brown 26-yard field goal, 1:13. Seahawks 20–14. Drive: 13 plays, 75 yards, 5:56.

Fourth quarter

- KC – Lawrence Tynes 23-yard field goal, 14:34. Seahawks 20–17. Drive: 5 plays, 55 yards, 1:39.
- SEA – Josh Brown 21-yard field goal, 9:56. Seahawks 23–17. Drive: 9 plays, 66 yards, 4:38.

Top passers

- SEA – Matt Hasselbeck – 22/33, 254 yards, 2 TD
- KC – Jonathan Quinn – 11/23, 126 yards

Top rushers

- SEA – Shaun Alexander – 12 rushes, 23 yards
- KC – Larry Johnson – 9 rushes, 147 yards, TD

Top receivers

- SEA – Darrell Jackson – 7 receptions, 99 yards, TD
- KC – Eddie Kennison – 4 receptions, 66 yards

==== Week 4: at St. Louis Rams ====
Week 4: Kansas City Chiefs at St. Louis Rams – Game summary

| Quarter | 1 | 2 | 3 | 4 | Total |
|---|---|---|---|---|---|
| Chiefs | 3 | 17 | 0 | 3 | 23 |
| Rams | 3 | 7 | 10 | 7 | 27 |

at Edward Jones Dome, St. Louis, Missouri

- Date: September 2
- Game time: 7:00 p.m. CDT
- Game weather: None (indoor stadium)
- Game attendance: 65,284
- Referee: Terry McAulay
- Recap, Game Book

Game information

First quarter

- STL – Jeff Wilkins 32-yard field goal, 7:50. Rams 3–0. Drive: 4 plays, –5 yards, 2:22.
- KC – Lawrence Tynes 37-yard field goal, 2:59. Tied 3–3. Drive: 9 plays, 52 yards, 4:51.

Second quarter

- KC – Lawrence Tynes 26-yard field goal, 11:19. Chiefs 6–3. Drive: 9 plays, 35 yards, 5:03.
- STL – Aveion Cason 1-yard run (Jeff Wilkins kick), 3:17. Rams 10–6. Drive: 14 plays, 74 yards, 8:02.
- KC – Jeris McIntyre 28-yard pass from Jonathan Quinn (Lawrence Tynes kick), 1:43. Chiefs 13–10. Drive: 5 plays, 74 yards, 1:34.
- KC – Dee Brown 4-yard run (Lawrence Tynes kick), 1:14. Chiefs 20–10. Drive: 2 plays, 24 yards, 0:12.

Third quarter

- STL – Shaun McDonald 40-yard pass from Ryan Fitzpatrick (Jeff Wilkins kick), 7:32. Chiefs 20–17. Drive: 5 plays, 58 yards, 3:07.
- STL – Jeff Wilkins 47-yard field goal, 5:27. Tied 20–20. Drive: 4 plays, 2 yards, 1:47.

Fourth quarter

- KC – Lawrence Tynes 21-yard field goal, 8:11. Chiefs 23–20. Drive: 7 plays, 11 yards, 4:39.
- STL – Dane Looker 20-yard pass from Ryan Fitzpatrick (Jeff Wilkins kick), 3:42. Rams 27–23. Drive: 11 plays, 80 yards, 4:29.

Top passers

- KC – Jonathan Quinn – 13/20, 197 yards, TD, 2 INT
- STL – Ryan Fitzpatrick – 12/22, 195 yards, 2 TD, INT

Top rushers

- KC – Dee Brown – 7 rushes, 29 yards, TD
- STL – Aveion Cason – 20 rushes, 67 yards, TD

Top receivers

- KC – Jeris McIntyre – 3 receptions, 80 yards, TD
- STL – Shaun McDonald – 3 receptions, 73 yards, TD

== Regular season ==
=== Schedule ===
| Week | Date | Opponent | Result | Record | Venue | Recap |
|---|---|---|---|---|---|---|
| 1 | September 11 | New York Jets | **W** 27–7 | 1–0 | Arrowhead Stadium | Recap |
| 2 | September 18 | at **Oakland Raiders** | **W** 23–17 | 2–0 | McAfee Coliseum | Recap |
| 3 | September 26 | at **Denver Broncos** | **L** 10–30 | 2–1 | Invesco Field at Mile High | Recap |
| 4 | October 2 | Philadelphia Eagles | **L** 31–37 | 2–2 | Arrowhead Stadium | Recap |
| 5 | Bye | | | | | |
| 6 | October 16 | Washington Redskins | **W** 28–21 | 3–2 | Arrowhead Stadium | Recap |
| 7 | October 21 | at Miami Dolphins | **W** 30–20 | 4–2 | Dolphins Stadium | Recap |
| 8 | October 30 | at **San Diego Chargers** | **L** 20–28 | 4–3 | Qualcomm Stadium | Recap |
| 9 | November 6 | **Oakland Raiders** | **W** 27–23 | 5–3 | Arrowhead Stadium | Recap |
| 10 | November 13 | at Buffalo Bills | **L** 3–14 | 5–4 | Ralph Wilson Stadium | Recap |
| 11 | November 20 | at Houston Texans | **W** 45–17 | 6–4 | Reliant Stadium | Recap |
| 12 | November 27 | New England Patriots | **W** 26–16 | 7–4 | Arrowhead Stadium | Recap |
| 13 | December 4 | **Denver Broncos** | **W** 31–27 | 8–4 | Arrowhead Stadium | Recap |
| 14 | December 11 | at Dallas Cowboys | **L** 28–31 | 8–5 | Texas Stadium | Recap |
| 15 | December 17 | at New York Giants | **L** 17–27 | 8–6 | Giants Stadium | Recap |
| 16 | December 24 | **San Diego Chargers** | **W** 20–7 | 9–6 | Arrowhead Stadium | Recap |
| 17 | January 1 | Cincinnati Bengals | **W** 37–3 | 10–6 | Arrowhead Stadium | Recap |

Note: Intra-division opponents are in bold text.

=== Game summaries ===
==== Week 1: vs. New York Jets ====
Week 1: New York Jets at Kansas City Chiefs – Game summary

| Quarter | 1 | 2 | 3 | 4 | Total |
|---|---|---|---|---|---|
| Jets | 0 | 0 | 0 | 7 | **7** |
| **Chiefs** | 14 | 3 | 3 | 7 | **27** |

at Arrowhead Stadium, Kansas City, Missouri

- Date: September 11
- Game time: 12:00 p.m. CDT
- Game weather: Clear, 81 °F (27 °C)
- Game attendance: 78,014
- Referee: Larry Nemmers
- TV announcers (CBS): Jim Nantz, Phil Simms and Bonnie Bernstein
- Recap, Game Book

Game information

**First quarter**

- KC – Larry Johnson 35-yard run (Lawrence Tynes kick), 13:39. Chiefs 7–0. **Drive: 3 plays, 75 yards, 1:21.**
- KC – Priest Holmes 3-yard run (Lawrence Tynes kick), 3:04. Chiefs 14–0. **Drive: 12 plays, 95 yards, 6:57.**

**Second quarter**

- KC – Lawrence Tynes 41-yard field goal, 12:02. Chiefs 17–0. **Drive: 7 plays, 56 yards, 2:58.**

**Third quarter**

- KC – Lawrence Tynes 38-yard field goal, 4:13. Chiefs 20–0. **Drive: 5 plays, 14 yards, 2:02.**

**Fourth quarter**

- KC – Larry Johnson 4-yard run (Lawrence Tynes kick), 14:56. Chiefs 27–0. **Drive: 7 plays, 66 yards, 2:57.**
- NYJ – Chris Baker 23-yard pass from Jay Fiedler (Mike Nugent kick), 0:29. Chiefs 27–7. **Drive: 11 plays, 78 yards, 1:35.**

**Top passers**

- NYJ – Chad Pennington – 21/34, 264 yards, INT
- KC – Trent Green – 15/26, 200 yards, INT

**Top rushers**

- NYJ – Curtis Martin – 20 rushes, 57 yards
- KC – Larry Johnson – 9 rushes, 110 yards, 2 TD

**Top receivers**

- NYJ – Chris Baker – 7 receptions, 124 yards, TD
- KC – Eddie Kennison – 4 receptions, 76 yards

==== Week 2: at Oakland Raiders ====
Week 2: Kansas City Chiefs at Oakland Raiders – Game summary

| Quarter | 1 | 2 | 3 | 4 | Total |
|---|---|---|---|---|---|
| **Chiefs** | 7 | 10 | 3 | 3 | **23** |
| Raiders | 0 | 10 | 7 | 0 | **17** |

at McAfee Coliseum, Oakland, California

- Date: September 18
- Game time: 7:30 p.m. CDT/5:30 p.m. PDT
- Game weather: Sunny, 70 °F (21 °C)
- Game attendance: 62,273
- Referee: Bill Leavy
- TV announcers (ESPN): Mike Tirico, Sterling Sharpe and Suzy Kolber
- Recap, Game Book

Game information

**First quarter**

- KC – Priest Holmes 1-yard run (Lawrence Tynes kick), 9:30. Chiefs 7–0. **Drive: 8 plays, 17 yards, 4:26.**

**Second quarter**

- OAK – LaMont Jordan 1-yard run (Sebastian Janikowski kick), 14:57. Tied 7–7. **Drive: 6 plays, 49 yards, 2:59.**
- KC – Larry Johnson 6-yard run (Lawrence Tynes kick), 13:15. Chiefs 14–7. **Drive: 4 plays, 70 yards, 1:42.**
- OAK – Sebastian Janikowski 29-yard field goal, 8:30. Chiefs 14–10. **Drive: 11 plays, 64 yards, 4:45.**
- KC – Lawrence Tynes 31-yard field goal, 2:26. Chiefs 17–10. **Drive: 7 plays, 59 yards, 3:03.**

**Third quarter**

- OAK – Randy Moss 64-yard pass from Kerry Collins (Sebastian Janikowski kick), 9:18. Tied 17–17. **Drive: 1 play, 64 yards, 0:11.**
- KC – Lawrence Tynes 39-yard field goal, 0:00. Chiefs 20–17. **Drive: 15 plays, 53 yards, 9:18.**

**Fourth quarter**

- KC – Lawrence Tynes 42-yard field goal, 8:46. Chiefs 23–17. **Drive: 11 plays, 54 yards, 4:39.**

**Top passers**

- KC – Trent Green – 18/28, 237 yards
- OAK – Kerry Collins – 21/35, 263 yards, TD

**Top rushers**

- KC – Priest Holmes – 19 rushes, 75 yards, TD
- OAK – LaMont Jordan – 15 rushes, 59 yards, TD

**Top receivers**

- KC – Samie Parker – 3 receptions, 86 yards
- OAK – Randy Moss – 5 receptions, 127 yards, TD

==== Week 3: at Denver Broncos ====
Week 3: Kansas City Chiefs at Denver Broncos – Game summary

| Quarter | 1 | 2 | 3 | 4 | Total |
|---|---|---|---|---|---|
| Chiefs | 0 | 3 | 0 | 7 | **10** |
| **Broncos** | 17 | 3 | 7 | 3 | **30** |

at Invesco Field at Mile High, Denver, Colorado

- Date: September 26
- Game time: 8:00 p.m. CDT/7:00 p.m. MDT
- Game weather: Clear, 72 °F (22 °C)
- Game attendance: 76,381
- Referee: Terry McAulay
- TV announcers (ABC): Al Michaels, John Madden and Sam Ryan
- Recap, Game Book

Game information

**First quarter**

- DEN – Jason Elam 30-yard field goal, 7:50. Broncos 3–0. **Drive: 8 plays, 68 yards, 3:29.**
- DEN – Mike Anderson 44-yard run (Jason Elam kick), 3:29. Broncos 10–0. **Drive: 3 plays, 80 yards, 1:44.**
- DEN – Rod Smith 12-yard pass from Jake Plummer (Jason Elam kick), 2:36. Broncos 17–0. **Drive: 1 play, 12 yards, 0:06.**

**Second quarter**

- DEN – Jason Elam 51-yard field goal, 5:59. Broncos 20–0. **Drive: 9 plays, 42 yards, 3:58.**
- KC – Lawrence Tynes 28-yard field goal, 0:24. Broncos 20–3. **Drive: 13 plays, 70 yards, 5:35.**

**Third quarter**

- DEN – Jake Plummer 1-yard run (Jason Elam kick), 8:34. Broncos 27–3. **Drive: 10 plays, 70 yards, 6:26.**

**Fourth quarter**

- DEN – Jason Elam 25-yard field goal, 12:30. Broncos 30–3. **Drive: 13 plays, 82 yards, 7:00.**
- KC – Samie Parker 21-yard pass from Trent Green (Lawrence Tynes kick), 2:00. Broncos 30–10. **Drive: 15 plays, 64 yards, 3:58.**

**Top passers**

- KC – Trent Green – 23/44, 221 yards, TD
- DEN – Jake Plummer – 13/18, 152 yards, TD

**Top rushers**

- KC – Priest Holmes – 14 rushes, 61 yards
- DEN – Mike Anderson – 20 rushes, 98 yards, TD

**Top receivers**

- KC – Eddie Kennison – 8 receptions, 112 yards
- DEN – Rod Smith – 7 receptions, 80 yards, TD

==== Week 4: vs. Philadelphia Eagles ====
Week 4: Philadelphia Eagles at Kansas City Chiefs – Game summary

| Quarter | 1 | 2 | 3 | 4 | Total |
|---|---|---|---|---|---|
| **Eagles** | 0 | 13 | 11 | 13 | **37** |
| Chiefs | 10 | 14 | 0 | 7 | **31** |

at Arrowhead Stadium, Kansas City, Missouri

- Date: October 2
- Game time: 3:15 p.m. CDT
- Game weather: Clear, 87 °F (31 °C)
- Game attendance: 78,742
- Referee: Pete Morelli
- TV announcers (Fox): Joe Buck, Troy Aikman and Pam Oliver
- Recap, Game Book

Game information

**First quarter**

- KC – Priest Holmes 3-yard run (Lawrence Tynes kick), 9:59. Chiefs 7–0. **Drive: 9 plays, 63 yards, 5:01.**
- KC – Lawrence Tynes 38-yard field goal, 2:00. Chiefs 10–0. **Drive: 8 plays, 76 yards, 4:31.**

**Second quarter**

- KC – Eddie Kennison 4-yard pass from Trent Green (Lawrence Tynes kick), 13:43. Chiefs 17–0. **Drive: 6 plays, 27 yards, 3:08.**
- PHI – Sheldon Brown 40-yard interception return (pass failed), 4:41. Chiefs 17–6.
- KC – Dante Hall 96-yard kickoff return (Lawrence Tynes kick), 4:27. Chiefs 24–6.
- PHI – Terrell Owens 7-yard pass from Donovan McNabb (Todd France kick), 1:14. Chiefs 24–13. **Drive: 5 plays, 50 yards, 1:26.**

**Third quarter**

- PHI – Todd France 44-yard field goal, 12:14. Chiefs 24–16. **Drive: 8 plays, 26 yards, 2:46.**
- PHI – Mike Bartrum 3-yard pass from Donovan McNabb (Donovan McNabb–Brian Westbrook pass), 1:54. Tied 24–24. **Drive: 4 plays, 60 yards, 1:41.**

**Fourth quarter**

- PHI – Todd France 37-yard field goal, 11:38. Eagles 27–24. **Drive: 9 plays, 71 yards, 3:49.**
- PHI – L. J. Smith 3-yard pass from Donovan McNabb (Todd France kick), 8:57. Eagles 34–24. **Drive: 6 plays, 25 yards, 2:33.**
- PHI – Todd France 26-yard field goal, 3:22. Eagles 37–24. **Drive: 9 plays, 33 yards, 3:48.**
- KC – Dante Hall 15-yard pass from Trent Green (Lawrence Tynes kick), 1:24. Eagles 37–31. **Drive: 8 plays, 75 yards, 1:58.**

**Top passers**

- PHI – Donovan McNabb – 33/48, 369 yards, 3 TD, INT
- KC – Trent Green – 19/30, 222 yards, 2 TD, 2 INT

**Top rushers**

- PHI – Brian Westbrook – 9 rushes, 15 yards
- KC – Priest Holmes – 18 rushes, 84 yards, TD

**Top receivers**

- PHI – Terrell Owens – 11 receptions, 171 yards, TD
- KC – Eddie Kennison – 7 receptions, 109 yards, TD

==== Week 6: vs. Washington Redskins ====
Week 6: Washington Redskins at Kansas City Chiefs – Game summary

| Quarter | 1 | 2 | 3 | 4 | Total |
|---|---|---|---|---|---|
| Redskins | 0 | 7 | 14 | 0 | **21** |
| **Chiefs** | 3 | 3 | 15 | 7 | **28** |

at Arrowhead Stadium, Kansas City, Missouri

- Date: October 16
- Game time: 12:00 p.m. CDT
- Game weather: Partly cloudy, 66 °F (19 °C)
- Game attendance: 78,083
- Referee: Tony Corrente
- TV announcers (Fox): Kenny Albert, Daryl Johnston and Tony Siragusa
- Recap, Game Book

Game information

**First quarter**

- KC – Lawrence Tynes 20-yard field goal, 2:45. Chiefs 3–0. **Drive: 14 plays, 80 yards, 5:22.**

**Second quarter**

- WAS – Santana Moss 4-yard pass from Mark Brunell (Nick Novak kick), 13:31. Redskins 7–3. **Drive: 9 plays, 69 yards, 4:14.**
- KC – Lawrence Tynes 38-yard field goal, 5:54. Redskins 7–6. **Drive: 9 plays, 54 yards, 4:01.**

**Third quarter**

- KC – Priest Holmes 6-yard run (Trent Green–Marc Boerigter pass), 11:38. Chiefs 14–7. **Drive: 6 plays, 62 yards, 3:22.**
- WAS – Santana Moss 78-yard pass from Mark Brunell (Nick Novak kick), 10:48. Tied 14–14. **Drive: 2 plays, 69 yards, 0:50.**
- KC – Sammy Knight 80-yard fumble return (Lawrence Tynes kick), 5:40. Chiefs 21–14.
- WAS – Chris Cooley 11-yard pass from Mark Brunell (Nick Novak kick), 0:30. Tied 21–21. **Drive: 12 plays, 67 yards, 5:10.**

**Fourth quarter**

- KC – Priest Holmes 60-yard pass from Trent Green (Lawrence Tynes kick), 13:21. Chiefs 28–21. **Drive: 4 plays, 74 yards, 2:09.**

**Top passers**

- WAS – Mark Brunell – 25/41, 331 yards, 3 TD
- KC – Trent Green – 15/25, 181 yards, TD

**Top rushers**

- WAS – Clinton Portis – 21 rushes, 77 yards
- KC – Larry Johnson – 13 rushes, 53 yards, TD

**Top receivers**

- WAS – Santana Moss – 10 receptions, 173 yards, 2 TD
- KC – Priest Holmes – 5 receptions, 100 yards, TD

==== Week 7: at Miami Dolphins ====
Week 7: Kansas City Chiefs at Miami Dolphins – Game summary

| Quarter | 1 | 2 | 3 | 4 | Total |
|---|---|---|---|---|---|
| **Chiefs** | 7 | 7 | 10 | 6 | **30** |
| Dolphins | 0 | 6 | 7 | 7 | **20** |

at Dolphins Stadium, Miami Gardens, Florida

- Date: October 21
- Game time: 7:00 p.m. EDT/6:00 p.m. CDT
- Game weather: Cloudy, 78 °F (26 °C)
- Game attendance: 68,350
- Referee: Gerry Austin
- TV announcers (CBS): Gus Johnson and Steve Tasker
- Recap, Game Book

Game information

**First quarter**

- KC – Priest Holmes 5-yard run (Lawrence Tynes kick), 10:28. Chiefs 7–0. **Drive: 8 plays, 80 yards, 4:32.**

**Second quarter**

- MIA – Olindo Mare 33-yard field goal, 7:22. Chiefs 7–3. **Drive: 4 plays, −4 yards, 1:52.**
- KC – Larry Johnson 2-yard run (Lawrence Tynes kick), 1:56. Chiefs 14–3. **Drive: 10 plays, 80 yards, 5:26.**
- MIA – Olindo Mare 23-yard field goal, 0:05. Chiefs 14–6. **Drive: 9 plays, 67 yards, 1:51.**

**Third quarter**

- MIA – Ronnie Brown 65-yard run (Olindo Mare kick), 14:40. Chiefs 14–13. **Drive: 1 play, 65 yards, 0:20.**
- KC – Priest Holmes 35-yard run (Lawrence Tynes kick), 13:59. Chiefs 21–13. **Drive: 2 plays, 59 yards, 0:41.**
- KC – Lawrence Tynes 30-yard field goal, 3:37. Chiefs 24–13. **Drive: 14 plays, 73 yards, 7:53.**

**Fourth quarter**

- KC – Lawrence Tynes 51-yard field goal, 13:25. Chiefs 27–13. **Drive: 9 plays, 43 yards, 3:52.**
- KC – Lawrence Tynes 52-yard field goal, 10:41. Chiefs 30–13. **Drive: 5 plays, 29 yards, 1:29.**
- MIA – Chris Chambers 77-yard pass from Sage Rosenfels (Olindo Mare kick), 2:35. Chiefs 30–20. **Drive: 1 play, 77 yards, 0:12.**

**Top passers**

- KC – Trent Green – 20/34, 289 yards
- MIA – Gus Frerotte – 11/29, 125 yards, INT

**Top rushers**

- KC – Larry Johnson – 23 rushes, 93 yards, TD
- MIA – Ronnie Brown – 8 rushes, 95 yards, TD

**Top receivers**

- KC – Tony Gonzalez – 7 receptions, 67 yards
- MIA – Chris Chambers – 2 receptions, 88 yards, TD

==== Week 8: at San Diego Chargers ====
Week 8: Kansas City Chiefs at San Diego Chargers – Game summary

| Quarter | 1 | 2 | 3 | 4 | Total |
|---|---|---|---|---|---|
| Chiefs | 0 | 3 | 7 | 10 | **20** |
| **Chargers** | 7 | 14 | 0 | 7 | **28** |

at Qualcomm Stadium, San Diego, California

- Date: October 30
- Game time: 3:05 p.m. CST/1:05 p.m. PST
- Game weather: Clear and sunny, 73 °F (23 °C)
- Game attendance: 65,750
- Referee: Ed Hochuli
- TV announcers (CBS): Jim Nantz, Phil Simms and Bonnie Bernstein
- Recap, Game Book

Game information

**First quarter**

- SD – Antonio Gates 19-yard pass from Drew Brees (Nate Kaeding kick), 4:30. Chargers 7–0. **Drive: 9 plays, 81 yards, 4:03.**

**Second quarter**

- SD – Eric Parker 17-yard pass from LaDainian Tomlinson (Nate Kaeding kick), 14:56. Chargers 14–0. **Drive: 9 plays, 82 yards, 3:20.**
- KC – Lawrence Tynes 34-yard field goal, 1:56. Chargers 14–3. **Drive: 6 plays, 53 yards, 3:28.**
- SD – Antonio Gates 20-yard pass from Drew Brees (Nate Kaeding kick), 0:27. Chargers 21–3. **Drive: 5 plays, 74 yards, 1:29.**

**Third quarter**

- KC – Tony Gonzalez 16-yard pass from Trent Green (Lawrence Tynes kick), 6:45. Chargers 21–10. **Drive: 6 plays, 91 yards, 2:21.**

**Fourth quarter**

- KC – Lawrence Tynes 20-yard field goal, 12:00. Chargers 21–13. **Drive: 6 plays, 33 yards, 3:00.**
- SD – Antonio Gates 35-yard pass from Drew Brees (Nate Kaeding kick), 9:10. Chargers 28–13. **Drive: 5 plays, 53 yards, 2:50.**
- KC – Eddie Kennison 7-yard pass from Trent Green (Lawrence Tynes kick), 2:12. Chargers 28–20. **Drive: 7 plays, 64 yards, 1:37.**

**Top passers**

- KC – Trent Green – 31/43, 347 yards, 2 TD
- SD – Drew Brees – 25/43, 324 yards, 3 TD, INT

**Top rushers**

- KC – Larry Johnson – 6 rushes, 55 yards
- SD – LaDainian Tomlinson – 17 rushes, 69 yards

**Top receivers**

- KC – Eddie Kennison – 7 receptions, 115 yards, TD
- SD – Antonio Gates – 10 receptions, 145 yards, 3 TD

==== Week 9: vs. Oakland Raiders ====
Week 9: Oakland Raiders at Kansas City Chiefs – Game summary

| Quarter | 1 | 2 | 3 | 4 | Total |
|---|---|---|---|---|---|
| Raiders | 3 | 6 | 0 | 14 | **23** |
| **Chiefs** | 0 | 6 | 7 | 14 | **27** |

at Arrowhead Stadium, Kansas City, Missouri

- Date: November 6
- Game time: 12:00 p.m. CST
- Game weather: Sunny, 65 °F (18 °C)
- Game attendance: 79,033
- Referee: Larry Nemmers
- TV announcers (CBS): Kevin Harlan and Randy Cross
- Recap, Game Book

Game information

**First quarter**

- OAK – Sebastian Janikowski 32-yard field goal, 8:50. Raiders 3–0. **Drive: 4 plays, 4 yards, 0:52.**

**Second quarter**

- OAK – Sebastian Janikowski 49-yard field goal, 14:47. Raiders 6–0. **Drive: 15 plays, 53 yards, 6:22.**
- KC – Lawrence Tynes 27-yard field goal, 4:59. Raiders 6–3. **Drive: 11 plays, 52 yards, 5:36.**
- KC – Lawrence Tynes 47-yard field goal, 0:29. Tied 6–6. **Drive: 9 plays, 61 yards, 2:32.**
- OAK – Sebastian Janikowski 48-yard field goal, 0:05. Raiders 9–6. **Drive: 3 plays, 3 yards, 0:24.**

**Third quarter**

- KC – Tony Richardson 6-yard pass from Trent Green (Lawrence Tynes kick), 0:55. Chiefs 13–9. **Drive: 11 plays, 72 yards, 6:01.**

**Fourth quarter**

- KC – Larry Johnson 15-yard run (Lawrence Tynes kick), 12:56. Chiefs 20–9. **Drive: 5 plays, 35 yards, 2:42.**
- OAK – Jerry Porter 4-yard pas Kerry Collins (pass failed), 10:31. Chiefs 20–15. **Drive: 6 plays, 71 yards, 2:25.**
- OAK – Randy Moss 7-yard pass from Kerry Collins (LaMont Jordan run), 1:45. Raiders 23–20. **Drive: 14 plays, 84 yards, 6:22.**
- KC – Larry Johnson 1-yard run (Lawrence Tynes kick), 0:00. Chiefs 27–23. **Drive: 8 plays, 72 yards, 1:45.**

**Top passers**

- OAK – Kerry Collins – 21/40, 175 yards, 2 TD, INT
- KC – Trent Green – 22/35, 235 yards, TD

**Top rushers**

- OAK – LaMont Jordan – 19 rushes, 93 yards
- KC – Larry Johnson – 22 rushes, 107 yards, 2 TD

**Top receivers**

- OAK – Jerry Porter – 7 receptions, 68 yards, TD
- KC – Tony Gonzalez – 5 receptions, 70 yards

==== Week 10: at Buffalo Bills ====
Week 10: Kansas City Chiefs at Buffalo Bills – Game summary

| Quarter | 1 | 2 | 3 | 4 | Total |
|---|---|---|---|---|---|
| Chiefs | 3 | 0 | 0 | 0 | **3** |
| **Bills** | 0 | 7 | 7 | 0 | **14** |

at Ralph Wilson Stadium, Orchard Park, New York

- Date: November 13
- Game time: 1:00 p.m. EST/12:00 p.m. CST
- Game weather: Mostly sunny, 61 °F (16 °C)
- Game attendance: 72,093
- Referee: Tom White
- TV announcers (CBS): Kevin Harlan and Randy Cross
- Recap, Game Book

Game information

**First quarter**

- KC – Lawrence Tynes 35-yard field goal, 1:17. Chiefs 3–0. **Drive: 7 plays, 45 yards, 4:05.**

**Second quarter**

- BUF – Lee Evans 33-yard pass from J. P. Losman (Rian Lindell kick), 10:14. Bills 7–3. **Drive: 7 plays, 66 yards, 2:44.**

**Third quarter**

- BUF – Lee Evans 29-yard pass from J. P. Losman (Rian Lindell kick), 8:16. Bills 14–3. **Drive: 2 plays, 27 yards, 1:17.**

**Fourth quarter**

- No scoring plays.

**Top passers**

- KC – Trent Green – 23/40, 220 yards, 3 INT
- BUF – J. P. Losman – 9/16, 137 yards, 2 TD

**Top rushers**

- KC – Larry Johnson – 27 rushes, 132 yards
- BUF – Willis McGahee – 20 rushes, 66 yards

**Top receivers**

- KC – Tony Gonzalez – 8 receptions, 81 yards
- BUF – Lee Evans – 3 receptions, 66 yards, 2 TD

==== Week 11: at Houston Texans ====
Week 11: Kansas City Chiefs at Houston Texans – Game summary

| Quarter | 1 | 2 | 3 | 4 | Total |
|---|---|---|---|---|---|
| **Chiefs** | 10 | 21 | 0 | 14 | **45** |
| Texans | 7 | 0 | 10 | 0 | **17** |

at Reliant Stadium, Houston, Texas

- Date: November 20
- Game time: 7:30 p.m. CST
- Game weather: 58 °F (14 °C) (retractable roof open)
- Game attendance: 70,481
- Referee: Walt Coleman
- TV announcers (ESPN): Mike Patrick, Joe Theismann, Paul Maguire and Suzy Kolber
- Recap, Game Book

Game information

**First quarter**

- KC – Lawrence Tynes 35-yard field goal, 9:03. Chiefs 3–0. **Drive: 9 plays, 66 yards, 4:52.**
- KC – Larry Johnson 23-yard run (Lawrence Tynes kick), 4:20. Chiefs 10–0. **Drive: 10 plays, 72 yards, 4:04.**
- HOU – Jerome Mathis 99-yard kickoff return (Kris Brown kick), 4:05. Chiefs 10–7.

**Second quarter**

- KC – Eddie Kennison 26-yard pass from Trent Green (Lawrence Tynes kick), 10:14. Chiefs 17–7. **Drive: 4 plays, 71 yards, 1:28.**
- KC – Larry Johnson 1-yard run (Lawrence Tynes kick), 6:23. Chiefs 24–7. **Drive: 4 plays, 43 yards, 2:10.**
- KC – Eric Warfield 57-yard interception return (Lawrence Tynes kick), 0:03. Chiefs 31–7.

**Third quarter**

- HOU – Domanick Williams 3-yard run (Kris Brown kick), 8:54. Chiefs 31–14. **Drive: 6 plays, 37 yards, 2:39.**
- HOU – Kris Brown 22-yard field goal, 0:42. Chiefs 31–17. **Drive: 9 plays, 72 yards, 4:44.**

**Fourth quarter**

- KC – Eddie Kennison 7-yard pass from Trent Green (Lawrence Tynes kick), 8:38. Chiefs 38–17. **Drive: 12 plays, 51 yards, 7:04.**
- KC – Samie Parker 6-yard pass from Trent Green (Lawrence Tynes kick), 4:35. Chiefs 45–17. **Drive: 6 plays, 33 yards, 3:08.**

**Top passers**

- KC – Trent Green – 19/29, 240 yards, 3 TD, INT
- HOU – David Carr – 19/36, 182 yards, INT

**Top rushers**

- KC – Larry Johnson – 36 rushes, 211 yards, 2 TD
- HOU – Domanick Williams – 13 rushes, 57 yards, TD

**Top receivers**

- KC – Tony Gonzalez – 9 receptions, 98 yards
- HOU – Domanick Williams – 3 receptions, 53 yards

==== Week 12: vs. New England Patriots ====
Week 12: New England Patriots at Kansas City Chiefs – Game summary

| Quarter | 1 | 2 | 3 | 4 | Total |
|---|---|---|---|---|---|
| Patriots | 0 | 3 | 7 | 6 | **16** |
| **Chiefs** | 7 | 12 | 7 | 0 | **26** |

at Arrowhead Stadium, Kansas City, Missouri

- Date: November 27
- Game time: 12:00 p.m. CST
- Game weather: Overcast, 58 °F (14 °C)
- Game attendance: 78,025
- Referee: Bill Vinovich
- TV announcers (CBS): Dick Enberg, Rich Gannon and Armen Keteyian
- Recap, Game Book

Game information

**First quarter**

- KC – Larry Johnson 1-yard run (Lawrence Tynes kick), 9:03. Chiefs 7–0. **Drive: 9 plays, 66 yards, 4:52.**

**Second quarter**

- KC – Lawrence Tynes 25-yard field goal, 13:54. Chiefs 10–0. **Drive: 13 plays, 68 yards, 6:06.**
- KC – Lawrence Tynes 20-yard field goal, 10:38. Chiefs 13–0. **Drive: 5 plays, 23 yards, 2:15.**
- NE – Adam Vinatieri 29-yard field goal, 6:52. Chiefs 13–3. **Drive: 10 plays, 57 yards, 3:46.**
- KC – Lawrence Tynes 33-yard field goal, 1:51. Chiefs 16–3. **Drive: 9 plays, 66 yards, 5:01.**
- KC – Lawrence Tynes 47-yard field goal, 0:02. Chiefs 19–3. **Drive: 7 plays, 57 yards, 0:49.**

**Third quarter**

- KC – Dante Hall 52-yard pass from Trent Green (Lawrence Tynes kick), 10:28. Chiefs 26–3. **Drive: 2 plays, 68 yards, 0:52.**
- NE – Patrick Pass 1-yard run (Adam Vinatieri kick), 4:21. Chiefs 26–10. **Drive: 12 plays, 69 yards, 6:07.**

**Fourth quarter**

- NE – Christian Fauria 1-yard pass from Tom Brady (pass failed), 10:03. Chiefs 26–16. **Drive: 9 plays, 78 yards, 4:48.**

**Top passers**

- NE – Tom Brady – 22/40, 248 yards, TD, 4 INT
- KC – Trent Green – 19/26, 323 yards, TD

**Top rushers**

- NE – Patrick Pass – 8 rushes, 26 yards, TD
- KC – Larry Johnson – 31 rushes, 119 yards, TD

**Top receivers**

- NE – Tim Dwight – 5 receptions, 76 yards
- KC – Samie Parker – 5 receptions, 76 yards

==== Week 13: vs. Denver Broncos ====
Week 13: Denver Broncos at Kansas City Chiefs – Game summary

| Quarter | 1 | 2 | 3 | 4 | Total |
|---|---|---|---|---|---|
| Broncos | 7 | 14 | 3 | 3 | **27** |
| **Chiefs** | 7 | 14 | 3 | 7 | **31** |

at Arrowhead Stadium, Kansas City, Missouri

- Date: December 4
- Game time: 3:15 p.m. CST
- Game weather: Sunny and cold, 28 °F (−2 °C)
- Game attendance: 78,261
- Referee: Bill Leavy
- TV announcers (CBS): Jim Nantz, Phil Simms and Bonnie Bernstein
- Recap, Game Book

Game information

**First quarter**

- DEN – Mike Anderson 66-yard pass from Jake Plummer (Jason Elam kick), 9:14. Broncos 7–0. **Drive: 2 plays, 80 yards, 0:52.**
- KC – Dante Hall 41-yard pass from Trent Green (Lawrence Tynes kick), 5:49. Tied 7–7. **Drive: 8 plays, 74 yards, 3:25.**

**Second quarter**

- KC – Larry Johnson 1-yard run (Lawrence Tynes kick), 10:05. Chiefs 14–7. **Drive: 6 plays, 74 yards, 3:36.**
- DEN – Mike Anderson 1-yard run (Jason Elam kick), 3:27. Tied 14–14. **Drive: 12 plays, 56 yards, 6:38.**
- KC – Tony Gonzalez 25-yard pass from Trent Green (Lawrence Tynes kick), 1:39. Chiefs 21–14. **Drive: 4 plays, 61 yards, 1:48.**
- DEN – Bradlee Van Pelt 7-yard run (Jason Elam kick), 0:22. Tied 21–21. **Drive: 7 plays, 68 yards, 1:17.**

**Third quarter**

- KC – Lawrence Tynes 34-yard field goal, 10:04. Chiefs 24–21. **Drive: 6 plays, 4 yards, 3:30.**
- DEN – Jason Elam 22-yard field goal, 3:09. Tied 24–24. **Drive: 12 plays, 69 yards, 6:55.**

**Fourth quarter**

- DEN – Jason Elam 40-yard field goal, 13:31. Broncos 27–24. **Drive: 5 plays, 22 yards, 2:40.**
- KC – Larry Johnson 4-yard run (Lawrence Tynes kick), 9:58. Chiefs 31–27. **Drive: 6 plays, 70 yards, 3:33.**

**Top passers**

- DEN – Jake Plummer – 18/29, 276 yards, TD, 2 INT
- KC – Trent Green – 16/23, 253 yards, 2 TD, INT

**Top rushers**

- DEN – Tatum Bell – 5 rushes, 46 yards
- KC – Larry Johnson – 30 rushes, 140 yards, 2 TD

**Top receivers**

- DEN – Rod Smith – 6 receptions, 79 yards
- KC – Eddie Kennison – 4 receptions, 108 yards

==== Week 14: at Dallas Cowboys ====
Week 14: Kansas City Chiefs at Dallas Cowboys – Game summary

| Quarter | 1 | 2 | 3 | 4 | Total |
|---|---|---|---|---|---|
| Chiefs | 7 | 7 | 7 | 7 | **28** |
| **Cowboys** | 0 | 17 | 0 | 14 | **31** |

at Texas Stadium, Irving, Texas

- Date: December 11
- Game time: 3:15 p.m. CST
- Game weather: 64 °F (18 °C)
- Game attendance: 63,432
- Referee: Pete Morelli
- TV announcers (CBS): Jim Nantz, Phil Simms and Bonnie Bernstein
- Recap, Game Book

Game information

**First quarter**

- KC – Larry Johnson 11-yard run (Lawrence Tynes kick), 9:32. Chiefs 7–0. **Drive: 6 plays, 54 yards, 2:49.**

**Second quarter**

- DAL – Billy Cundiff 34-yard field goal, 8:00. Chiefs 7–3. **Drive: 15 plays, 73 yards, 9:16.**
- KC – Larry Johnson 1-yard run (Lawrence Tynes kick), 5:19. Chiefs 14–3. **Drive: 5 plays, 59 yards, 2:41.**
- DAL – Terry Glenn 71-yard pass from Drew Bledsoe (Billy Cundiff kick), 3:55. Chiefs 14–10. **Drive: 2 plays, 74 yards, 1:24.**
- DAL – Jason Witten 26-yard pass from Drew Bledsoe (Billy Cundiff kick), 0:40. Cowboys 17–14. **Drive: 3 plays, 26 yards, 0:22.**

**Third quarter**

- KC – Larry Johnson 21-yard run (Lawrence Tynes kick), 8:39. Chiefs 21–17. **Drive: 9 plays, 88 yards, 4:48.**

**Fourth quarter**

- DAL – Terry Glenn 6-yard run (Billy Cundiff kick), 13:07. Cowboys 24–21. **Drive: 11 plays, 84 yards, 4:50.**
- KC – Eddie Kennison 47-yard pass from Trent Green (Lawrence Tynes kick), 3:55. Chiefs 28–24. **Drive: 7 plays, 80 yards, 4:06.**
- DAL – Dan Campbell 1-yard pass from Drew Bledsoe (Billy Cundiff kick), 0:22. Cowboys 31–28. **Drive: 14 plays, 68 yards, 3:33.**

**Top passers**

- KC – Trent Green – 20/32, 340 yards, TD
- DAL – Drew Bledsoe – 22/34, 332 yards, 3 TD

**Top rushers**

- KC – Larry Johnson – 26 rushes, 143 yards, 3 TD
- DAL – Marion Barber – 15 rushes, 82 yards

**Top receivers**

- KC – Tony Gonzalez – 5 receptions, 94 yards
- DAL – Terry Glenn – 6 receptions, 138 yards, TD

==== Week 15: at New York Giants ====
Week 15: Kansas City Chiefs at New York Giants – Game summary

| Quarter | 1 | 2 | 3 | 4 | Total |
|---|---|---|---|---|---|
| Chiefs | 0 | 3 | 7 | 7 | **17** |
| **Giants** | 0 | 10 | 3 | 14 | **27** |

at Giants Stadium, East Rutherford, New Jersey

- Date: December 17
- Game time: 5:00 p.m. EST/4:00 p.m. CST
- Game weather: Clear, 39 °F (4 °C)
- Game attendance: 78,625
- Referee: Bill Carollo
- TV announcers (CBS): Jim Nantz, Phil Simms and Bonnie Bernstein
- Recap, Game Book

Game information

**First quarter**

- No scoring plays.

**Second quarter**

- KC – Lawrence Tynes 19-yard field goal, 6:36. Chiefs 3–0. **Drive: 14 plays, 81 yards, 6:10.**
- NYG – Tiki Barber 41-yard run (Jay Feely kick), 2:47. Giants 7–3. **Drive: 8 plays, 67 yards, 3:49.**
- NYG – Jay Feely 41-yard field goal, 0:28. Giants 10–3. **Drive: 6 plays, 32 yards, 1:11.**

**Third quarter**

- KC – Larry Johnson 14-yard run (Lawrence Tynes kick), 12:01. Tied 10–10. **Drive: 5 plays, 59 yards, 2:39.**
- NYG – Jay Feely 45-yard field goal, 0:48. Giants 13–10. **Drive: 7 plays, 75 yards, 3:08.**

**Fourth quarter**

- NYG – Amani Toomer 31-yard pass from Eli Manning (Jay Feely kick), 12:51. Giants 20–10. **Drive: 4 plays, 71 yards, 2:53.**
- KC – Larry Johnson 1-yard run (Lawrence Tynes kick), 8:29. Giants 20–17. **Drive: 8 plays, 69 yards, 4:23.**
- NYG – Tiki Barber 20-yard run (Jay Feely kick), 2:48. Giants 27–17. **Drive: 10 plays, 66 yards, 5:41.**

**Top passers**

- KC – Trent Green – 15/28, 176 yards, INT
- NYG – Eli Manning – 17/32, 186 yards, TD, INT

**Top rushers**

- KC – Larry Johnson – 31 rushes, 167 yards, 2 TD
- NYG – Tiki Barber – 29 rushes, 220 yards, 2 TD

**Top receivers**

- KC – Samie Parker – 6 receptions, 87 yards
- NYG – Amani Toomer – 5 receptions, 69 yards, TD

==== Week 16: vs. San Diego Chargers ====
Week 16: San Diego Chargers at Kansas City Chiefs – Game summary

| Quarter | 1 | 2 | 3 | 4 | Total |
|---|---|---|---|---|---|
| Chargers | 7 | 0 | 0 | 0 | **7** |
| **Chiefs** | 7 | 13 | 0 | 0 | **20** |

at Arrowhead Stadium, Kansas City, Missouri

- Date: December 24
- Game time: 12:00 p.m. CST
- Game weather: Overcast with rain, 42 °F (6 °C)
- Game attendance: 75,956
- Referee: Mike Carey
- TV announcers (CBS): Kevin Harlan and Randy Cross
- Recap, Game Book

Game information

**First quarter**

- KC – Larry Johnson 4-yard run (Lawrence Tynes kick), 9:28. Chiefs 7–0. **Drive: 6 plays, 43 yards, 2:58.**
- SD – Antonio Gates 18-yard pass from Drew Brees (Nate Kaeding kick), 4:06. Tied 7–7. **Drive: 10 plays, 75 yards, 5:22.**

**Second quarter**

- KC – Samie Parker 42-yard pass from Trent Green (Lawrence Tynes kick), 14:53. Chiefs 14–7. **Drive: 8 plays, 67 yards, 4:13.**
- KC – Larry Johnson 28-yard pass from Trent Green (kick short), 1:45. Chiefs 20–7. **Drive: 6 plays, 57 yards, 2:37.**

**Third quarter**

- No scoring plays.

**Fourth quarter**

- No scoring plays.

**Top passers**

- SD – Drew Brees – 18/33, 161 yards, TD, INT
- KC – Trent Green – 19/35, 207 yards, 2 TD

**Top rushers**

- SD – LaDainian Tomlinson – 14 rushes, 47 yards
- KC – Larry Johnson – 32 rushes, 131 yards, TD

**Top receivers**

- SD – Keenan McCardell – 6 receptions, 58 yards
- KC – Tony Gonzalez – 5 receptions, 58 yards

==== Week 17: vs. Cincinnati Bengals ====
Week 17: Cincinnati Bengals at Kansas City Chiefs – Game summary

| Quarter | 1 | 2 | 3 | 4 | Total |
|---|---|---|---|---|---|
| Bengals | 3 | 0 | 0 | 0 | **3** |
| **Chiefs** | 3 | 17 | 10 | 7 | **37** |

at Arrowhead Stadium, Kansas City, Missouri

- Date: January 1
- Game time: 12:00 p.m. CDT
- Game weather: Clear, 52 °F (11 °C)
- Game attendance: 77,211
- Referee: Ed Hochuli
- TV announcers (CBS): Dick Enberg, Dan Dierdorf and Armen Keteyian
- Recap, Game Book

Game information

**First quarter**

- KC – Lawrence Tynes 39-yard field goal, 4:43. Chiefs 3–0. **Drive: 11 plays, 65 yards, 5:38.**
- CIN – Shayne Graham 49-yard field goal, 1:12. Tied 3–3. **Drive: 6 plays, 43 yards, 3:31.**

**Second quarter**

- KC – Lawrence Tynes 24-yard field goal, 10:27. Chiefs 6–3. **Drive: 11 plays, 64 yards, 5:45.**
- KC – Larry Johnson 49-yard run (Lawrence Tynes kick), 1:54. Chiefs 13–3. **Drive: 5 plays, 68 yards, 1:55.**
- KC – Larry Johnson 14-yard run (Lawrence Tynes kick), 1:14. Chiefs 20–3. **Drive: 2 plays, 41 yards, 0:23.**

**Third quarter**

- KC – Larry Johnson 20-yard run (Lawrence Tynes kick), 12:41. Chiefs 27–3. **Drive: 6 plays, 60 yards, 2:19.**
- KC – Lawrence Tynes 23-yard field goal, 4:11. Chiefs 30–3. **Drive: 5 plays, 58 yards, 2:55.**

**Fourth quarter**

- KC – Dee Brown 8-yard pass from Trent Green (Lawrence Tynes kick), 2:47. Chiefs 37–3. **Drive: 5 plays, 49 yards, 2:51.**

**Top passers**

- CIN – Jon Kitna – 13/24, 76 yards, 2 INT
- KC – Trent Green – 23/29, 344 yards, TD

**Top rushers**

- CIN – Rudi Johnson – 10 rushes, 18 yards
- KC – Larry Johnson – 26 rushes, 201 yards, 3 TD

**Top receivers**

- CIN – Chad Johnson – 4 receptions, 55 yards
- KC – Eddie Kennison – 7 receptions, 151 yards

=== Standings ===
AFC West
| | W | L | T | PCT | DIV | CONF | PF | PA | STK |
|---|---|---|---|---|---|---|---|---|---|
| ^{(2)} Denver Broncos | 13 | 3 | 0 | .813 | 5–1 | 10–2 | 395 | 258 | W4 |
| Kansas City Chiefs | 10 | 6 | 0 | .625 | 4–2 | 9–3 | 403 | 325 | W2 |
| San Diego Chargers | 9 | 7 | 0 | .563 | 3–3 | 7–5 | 418 | 312 | L2 |
| Oakland Raiders | 4 | 12 | 0 | .250 | 0–6 | 2–10 | 290 | 383 | L6 |
