= Samie Parker =

American gridiron football player (born 1981)

Delaware State Hornets
- Title: Wide receivers coach

Personal information
- Born: March 25, 1981 (age 45); Long Beach, California, U.S.
- Listed height: 5 ft 11 in (1.80 m)
- Listed weight: 185 lb (84 kg)

Career information
- Position: Wide receiver (No. 18)
- High school: Long Beach Polytechnic
- College: Oregon
- NFL draft: 2004: 4th round, 105th overall pick

Career history

Playing
- Kansas City Chiefs (2004–2007); Denver Broncos (2008)*; Carolina Panthers (2008)*; Seattle Seahawks (2008); Oakland Raiders (2009)*; Las Vegas Locomotives (2009); Chicago Rush (2010); Las Vegas Locomotives (2010-2011); Kansas City Command (2012); Toronto Argonauts (2012)*; Las Vegas Locomotives (2012); Los Angeles Kiss (2014)
- * Offseason or practice squad member only

Coaching
- MidAmerica Nazarene (2013) Wide receivers coach; Fort Valley State (2015) Special teams coordinator & wide receivers coach; Kansas City Chiefs (2016) Intern; Kansas City Chiefs (2018) Intern; Whittier (2018–2019) Wide receivers coach & pass game coordinator; The Spring League (2020) Wide receivers coach, tight ends coach, & returners coach; Washington State (2021) Recruiting assistant; Rice (2022) Offensive quality control coach; North Alabama (2023–2024) Wide receivers coach; Delaware State (2025–present) Wide receivers coach

Awards and highlights
- 2× UFL champion (2009, 2010)

Career NFL statistics
- Receptions: 110
- Receiving yards: 1,529
- Receiving touchdowns: 7
- Stats at Pro Football Reference

Samie Jabar Parker (born March 25, 1981) is an American football coach and former player. He is the wide receiver's coach at Delaware State University, a position he has held since 2025. He was selected by the Kansas City Chiefs in the fourth round of the 2004 NFL draft. He played college football at Oregon. Parker was also a member of the Denver Broncos, Carolina Panthers, Seattle Seahawks, Oakland Raiders, Las Vegas Locomotives, Chicago Rush, Kansas City Command, Toronto Argonauts and Los Angeles Kiss.

== Early life ==
He graduated from Long Beach Polytechnic High School. where he also played pop warner. Samie was an All-Star player for King Central little league. He was a center fielder and the lead off hitter. He was also very skilled at card tricks.

Parker played college football for the Oregon Ducks. He was also an All-American sprinter for the Oregon Ducks track and field team over the 100 m and 60 m distances.

== Professional career ==
=== Kansas City Chiefs ===
Parker was drafted by the Kansas City Chiefs in the fourth round of the 2004 NFL draft. He played for them from 2004 to 2008.

=== Denver Broncos ===
Parker was signed by the Denver Broncos in the 2008 offseason; however, he was released on August 25 before the regular season.

=== Carolina Panthers ===
A day after being released by the Broncos, Parker was signed by the Carolina Panthers when the team waived wide receiver Sean Bailey. He was later released on August 30, 2008.

=== Seattle Seahawks ===
Parker was signed by the Seattle Seahawks on September 10, 2008. He was released three days later after the team signed wide receiver Michael Bumpus off its practice squad.

=== Oakland Raiders ===
Parker was signed by the Oakland Raiders on May 12, 2009. He was released on August 26 to make room for cornerback Mike Hawkins.

=== Las Vegas Locomotives ===
Parker played with the locomotives for the inaugural season of the UFL.

=== Chicago Rush ===
The Chicago Rush of the Arena Football League signed Parker for the team's 2010 season. Parker started 11 games for the Rush, catching 78 passes for 1,135 yards and 15 touchdowns.

=== Second stint with the Locomotives ===
Parker joined the locos for the second season of the UFL.

=== Toronto Argonauts ===
On March 29, 2012, Samie Parker signed with the Toronto Argonauts of the Canadian Football League. On Wednesday, June 20, Parker was released by the Argonauts.

== NFL career statistics ==
Legend
| **Bold** | Career high |

=== Regular season ===
| Year | Team | Games | | Receiving | | | | | |
| Year | Team | GP | GS | Tgt | Rec | Yds | Avg | Lng | TD |
|---|---|---|---|---|---|---|---|---|---|
| 2004 | KAN | 4 | 0 | 13 | 9 | 137 | **15.2** | 48 | 1 |
| 2005 | KAN | 12 | 9 | 58 | 36 | 533 | 14.8 | **49** | **3** |
| 2006 | KAN | **16** | **15** | **68** | **41** | **561** | 13.7 | 43 | 1 |
| 2007 | KAN | 15 | 7 | 41 | 24 | 298 | 12.4 | 24 | 2 |
| Career | | 47 | 31 | 180 | 110 | 1,529 | 13.9 | 49 | 7 |

=== Playoffs ===
| Year | Team | Games | | Receiving | | | | | |
| Year | Team | GP | GS | Tgt | Rec | Yds | Avg | Lng | TD |
|---|---|---|---|---|---|---|---|---|---|
| 2006 | KAN | **1** | **1** | **1** | 0 | 0 | 0.0 | 0 | 0 |
| Career | | 1 | 1 | 1 | 0 | 0 | 0.0 | 0 | 0 |

== Coaching career ==
On December 8, 2022, Parker was announced as the wide receivers coach at North Alabama.

In 2025, Parker was hired on the inaugural staff for DeSean Jackson as the wide receivers coach for Delaware State.
