= Tommy Frevert =

American football player (born 1986)

No. 81, 94, 28, 11
- Position: Placekicker

Personal information
- Born: November 24, 1986 (age 39)
- Listed height: 6 ft 0 in (1.83 m)
- Listed weight: 200 lb (91 kg)

Career information
- High school: Lee's Summit North (Lee's Summit, Missouri)
- College: Northwest Missouri State
- NFL draft: 2009: undrafted

Career history
- Kansas City Renegades (2013); Oklahoma Defenders (2014); Salina Bombers (2015); Philadelphia Soul (2015–2016)

Awards and highlights
- ArenaBowl champion (2016); 2× First-team All-Arena (2015, 2016); 2× AFL Kicker of the Year (2015, 2016); Second-team All-CPIFL (2014); First-team All-MIAA (2007)

Career AFL statistics
- FG made: 6
- FG att: 10
- PAT made: 242
- PAT att: 266
- Tackles: 14
- Stats at ArenaFan.com

Thomas Frevert (born November 24, 1986) is an American former professional football placekicker. He played college football at Northwest Missouri State. He was a member of the Kansas City Renegades, Oklahoma Defenders, Salina Bombers and Philadelphia Soul.

== Early life ==
Frevert played football, soccer, basketball and tennis at Lee's Summit North High School in Lee's Summit, Missouri. He was a Missouri All-Star in soccer his senior year.

== College career ==
Frevert played for the Northwest Missouri State Bearcats of Northwest Missouri State University from to 2005 to 2008. The Bearcats advanced to the NCAA Division II Football Championship each year of Frevert's college career but lost all four times. On December 10, 2006, he converted four field goals in a 33–3 win against Bloomsburg in the semifinals of the Division II playoffs, tying a record for most field goals in a Division II playoff game. He earned First Team All-MIAA honors his junior season in 2007 and Honorable Mention All-MIAA honors his senior season in 2008. He played in 59 games for the Bearcats, converting 41 field goals and over 260 extra points. (Note: Some sources indicate that Frevert converted 263 extra points during his college career. However, adding up his season totals gives him a total of 261 extra points.) He graduated from Northwest Missouri State with a bachelor's degree in biological psychology.

== Professional career ==
Frevert went undrafted in the 2009 NFL draft. He signed with the Kansas City Renegades of the Champions Professional Indoor Football League (CPIFL) on March 28, 2013, and played for the team during the 2013 season, converting 31 of 35 extra points and 5 of 16 field goals.

In November 2013, Frevert was signed by the Oklahoma Defenders of the CPIFL. He played for the team during the 2014 season and earned Second Team All-CPIFL honors. He was named the CPIFL Special Teams Player of the Week for Week 6 after converting five of five field goals and eight of eight extra points in a 73–61 win over the Lincoln Haymakers, setting a league record for most points by a kicker with 23 and tying a league record with five field goals.

Frevert signed with the Salina Bombers of Champions Indoor Football (CIF) for the 2015 season. He played in 6 games for the Bombers in 2015, converting 24 of 33 extra points and 7 of 16 field goals. He was also named the CIF Special Teams Player of the Week for Week 4 after converting four field goals against the Sioux City Bandits, the longest of which was 58 yards.

On April 1, 2015, Frevert was assigned to the Philadelphia Soul of the Arena Football League (AFL) after Soul kicker Carlos Martínez suffered an injury in the first game of the season on March 29. Frevert played in 17 games for the Soul in 2015, converting 124 of 137 extra points and 4 of 8 field goals. He earned first-team All-Arena and AFL Kicker of the Year honors. He had a workout with the New York Jets of the National Football League in November 2015. Frevert played in 15 games in 2016, converting 118 of 129 extra points and 2 of 2 field goals. He garnered first-team All-Arena and AFL Kicker of the Year honors for the second year in a row. In the American Conference Championship Game against the Jacksonville Sharks, he recovered a kickoff off the rebound net, converted seven of seven extra points, and had two successful onside kick attempts. He was then named the AFL Playmaker of the Week for the Conference Championship Round of the playoffs. The Soul also won ArenaBowl XXIX against the Arizona Rattlers by a score of 56–42.

== Personal life ==
In 2012, Frevert graduated from Rockhurst University with a doctorate of physical therapy and now works as a physical therapist.
