= Kansas City Renegades =

Logo

General information
- Founded: 2012
- Folded: 2013
- Headquartered: Kemper Arena in Kansas City, Missouri
- Colors: Black, Navy, Gold, White

Personnel
- Owner: Jeremy Ploeger
- General manager: Victor Mann
- Head coach: Toderick Devoe

Team history
- Kansas City Renegades (2013)

Home fields
- Kemper Arena (2013)

League / conference affiliations
- Champions Professional Indoor Football League (2013)

The Kansas City Renegades were a charter member of the Champions Professional Indoor Football League based in Kansas City, Missouri. They played their home games at Kemper Arena.

The Renegades were the second arena/indoor team based in Kansas City, following the Kansas City Command (previously known as the Kansas City Brigade) which played in the Arena Football League from 2006 until 2008 and then again from 2011 until 2012. The franchise abruptly folded in 2013 with no explanation.

== Franchise history ==
=== 2012 ===
The Renegades came about when the team purchased the physical assets of the Command. The Renegades are owned by Jeremy Ploeger; founder of sports management firm J&M Management, vice chairman of the Jackson County Board of Planning & Zoning Adjustments, and a former candidate for the Missouri House of Representatives in the 51st District. In addition, general manager Reggie Harris was the Brigade's general manager for their inaugural season. On September 20, 2012, the franchise announced that it would be nicknamed the "Renegades," with spokesman, Darron Story stating, "The Renegades name comes from going against the grain and represents our effort to separate ourselves from the past unsuccessful franchises. You have to have a renegade attitude to come behind that and be excited and have energy."

== Final roster ==
Kansas City Renegades roster
Quarterbacks: -- Chris Coffin; Running backs: -- Keithen Valentine; Wide receivers: -- Damond Berry; -- Jared Elmore; -- Charles Johnson; -- Anthony Parks; -- O. J. Simpson	Offensive linemen: -- Kimani Jones; -- Allen Stroud; -- Michael Wormley; Defensive linemen: -- Jamal Green; -- Jared Hernandez; -- Brandon Russell; -- Brandon Smith	Linebackers: -- Joe Carter; -- Rashad Washington; Defensive backs: -- David Garrett; -- Dorsey Golston III; -- William Griffin; -- Brandon Henderson; -- Alphonso Hodge; -- Donta Moore; Kickers: -- Tommy Frevert	Reserve lists: -- Marcus Boldon DL (IR); -- Brandon Ford OL (IR); Exempt List: Currently vacant; Practice Squad: Currently vacant; Rookies in italics; Roster updated May 4, 2013; 3 Active, 0 Inactive, 0 PS

== 2013 ==
The Renegades opened the season poorly with losses to Omaha and Sioux City to drop to 0–2, but bounced back in the following three weeks with wins over Oklahoma, Wichita and Kansas (Topeka). The first two wins over Oklahoma and Wichita came largely to the credit of both kick returner O. J. Simpson (unrelated to the NFL running back) who earned CPIFL Special Teams player of the week honors after scoring two touchdowns on kick returns against Wichita, and wide receiver Clinton Solomon who scored 4 touchdowns against Oklahoma and was named CPIFL Offensive player of the week on that day. Solomon raised his season total to 6 against Wichita the following week. Xavier Lee also led the team to victory against Wichita despite setting foot in Kansas City for the first time only a few days before the game. The Renegades defeated the Kansas Koyotes in week 6 to jump to their first time over .500 in franchise history. They finished the season 8–4. The team did not play in the 2014 season and no announcements about future play have been made.

=== Season schedule ===
Week	Date	Kickoff	Opponent	Results	
Week	Date	Kickoff	Opponent	Final Score	Team Record
1	Bye				
2	March 17 (Sun)	4:30pm	Omaha Beef	27-38	0-1
3	March 22 (Fri)	7:05pm	@Sioux City Bandits	26-38	0-2
4	March 30 (Sat)	7:30pm	Oklahoma Defenders	54-47	1-2
5	April 6 (Sat)	7:30pm	Wichita Wild	40-36	2-2
6	April 12 (Fri)	7:30pm	@Kansas Koyotes	56-28	3-2
7	April 20 (Sat)	7:30pm	@Mid-Missouri Outlaws	38-24	4-2
8	April 27 (Sat)	7:30pm	Salina Bombers	31-47	4-3
9	May 4 (Sat)	7:30pm	Sioux City Bandits	42-51	4-4
10	May 10 (Fri)	7:05pm	@Bloomington Edge	47-44	5-4
11	May 18 (Sat)	7:30pm	@Oklahoma Defenders	65-28	6-4
12	May 25 (Sat)	7:30pm	Kansas Koyotes	82-28	7-4
13	Bye				
14	June 8 (Sat)	7:30pm	@Omaha Beef	42-27	8-4
