= Dee Brown (American football) =

American football player (born 1978)

No. 22, 27, 39
- Position: Running back

Personal information
- Born: May 12, 1978 (age 48); Clearwater, Florida, U.S.
- Listed height: 5 ft 10 in (1.78 m)
- Listed weight: 210 lb (95 kg)

Career information
- High school: Lake Brantley (Altamonte Springs, Florida)
- College: Syracuse
- NFL draft: 2001: 6th round, 175th overall pick

Career history
- Carolina Panthers (2001–2002); Pittsburgh Steelers (2003); Atlanta Falcons (2004)*; Cleveland Browns (2004); Kansas City Chiefs (2005–2006); Washington Redskins (2007) *
- * Offseason or practice squad member only

Career NFL statistics
- Rushing attempts: 119
- Rushing yards: 405
- Rushing touchdowns: 4
- Receptions: 21
- Receiving yards: 114
- Receiving touchdowns: 2
- Stats at Pro Football Reference

Dadrian LaBreece "Dee" Brown (born May 12, 1978) is an American former professional football player who was a running back in the National Football League (NFL). He went to high school at Lake Brantley High School, where he played quarterback. He played college football for the Syracuse Orange and was moved to running back with Donovan McNabb as their quarterback. Brown was selected by the Carolina Panthers in the sixth round (175th overall) of the 2001 NFL draft.

After his playing career, Brown went into coaching, initially serving as a special assistant for the Denver Broncos. He then spent several years as a high school coach before joining the college ranks in 2021 as offensive coordinator for NCAA Division II Livingstone. After one season, he moved to Division I FCS Campbell as running backs coach.
