= Alphonso Hodge =

American gridiron football player (born 1982)

No. 47, 27, 2, 36
- Position: Cornerback

Personal information
- Born: May 30, 1982 (age 44); Cleveland, Ohio, U.S.
- Listed height: 5 ft 10 in (1.78 m)
- Listed weight: 203 lb (92 kg)

Career information
- High school: St. Edward (Lakewood, Ohio)
- College: Miami (OH)
- NFL draft: 2005: 5th round, 147th overall pick

Career history
- Kansas City Chiefs (2005–2006); New York Jets (2006–2007)*; Cleveland Gladiators (2008); Toronto Argonauts (2009–2010); Kansas City Renegades (2013)
- * Offseason or practice squad member only

Alphonso Hodge (born May 30, 1982) is an American former professional football defensive back. He was selected by the Kansas City Chiefs of the National Football League (NFL) in the fifth-round (147th overall) of the 2005 NFL draft.

Hodge was also a member of the New York Jets, Cleveland Gladiators, Toronto Argonauts, and Kansas City Renegades.

== Early life ==
Hodge was a three-year letterman in football and an all-state selection as a senior at St. Edward High School in Lakewood, Ohio.

== College career ==
Hodge was a four-year letterman at Miami University in Ohio, where he appeared in 46 games with 35 starts, including starts in his final 27 games. He recorded 147 tackles (103 solo), including 10 tackles for losses (-51.0 yards), eight sacks, three fumble recoveries and 24 passes defensed.

He started all 13 games in his senior season for the Redhawks, where he recorded 52 tackles (41 solo), 2.0 tackles for losses (-3.0 yards), 5.0 sacks (-31.0 yards) and six passes defensed. Hodge earned first-team All-MAC honors by The NFL draft Report as a senior. In his junior year, Hodge received second-team All-MAC honors after recording 47 tackles (27 solo), 1.0 sack (-3.0 yards), three fumble recoveries and nine passes defensed.

== Professional career ==
=== National Football League ===
Hodge was selected in the fifth round (147th overall) of the 2005 NFL draft by the Kansas City Chiefs. He spent time with the Chiefs (2005–2006) and with the New York Jets (2006).

=== Arena Football League ===
On April 8, 2008, Hodge was signed to the practice squad of the Cleveland Gladiators of the Arena Football League. Then, on April 17, 2008, he was called up to the active roster. He then made his arena football debut on April 19, 2008, against the Los Angeles Avengers.

=== Canadian Football League ===
The Toronto Argonauts signed him on February 25, 2009, and released him on November 22, 2010.
