= Northeast Collegiate Hockey League =

- Conference: ACHA
- Founded: 2007
- Commissioner: Steve Hurtubise
- Sports fielded: Ice hockey; men's: yes
- Division: Division I
- No. of teams: 6
- Headquarters: New Brunswick, New Jersey
- Region: Northeast
- Most recent champion: Oswego State Lakers (3rd title) (2024–25)
- Most titles: Niagara Purple Eagles (5)
- Website: League website

Locations
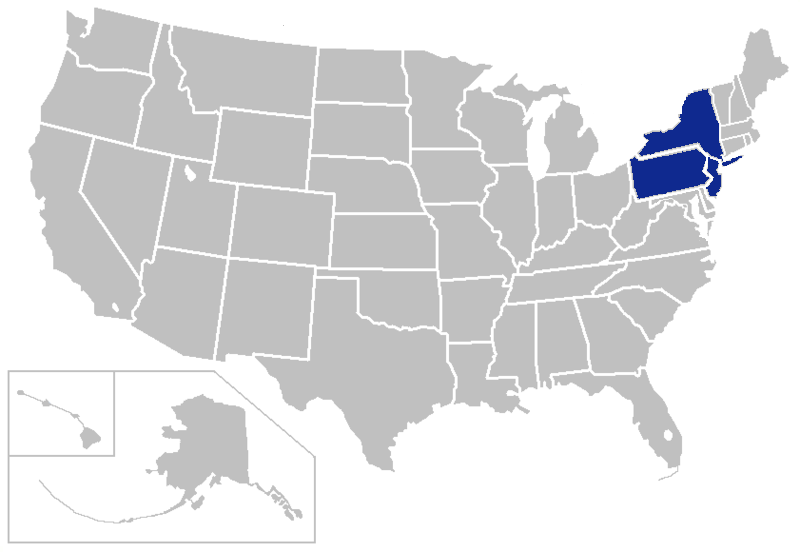

The Northeast Collegiate Hockey League is an ACHA Division I Hockey League consisting of seven teams in the Northeastern United States. A majority of members are located in New York with additional teams coming from New Jersey.

== History ==
The league was announced on July 19, 2007 with plans to begin its first season later that year. The league's first seven members were Binghamton University, Ithaca College, Penn State Berks, Rutgers University, St. Bonaventure University, SUNY Cortland, and SUNY Oswego. Andy Gojdycz was named the NECHL's first commissioner.

Ahead of the 2010–11 season, Syracuse University joined the NECHL from the Eastern Collegiate Hockey League. By 2013, the Orange were joined by four more former ECHL schools; Niagara University, Rochester Institute of Technology, University at Buffalo, and Canisius University.

The College of New Jersey jumped from ACHA Division II and joined the NECHL for the 2022–23 season.

Buffalo was unable to field a team for the 2024–25 season, leaving the NECHL with five teams. However, the Bulls remained members of the conference officially. Oswego announced it would leave the conference following the 2024–25 season and join the Atlantic Coast Collegiate Hockey League's new ACHA Division I conference.

In November 2025, it was announced Farmingdale State College and Sacred Heart University would join the NECHL for the 2026–27 season, with the former jumping up from ACHA Division II. Despite not being a full member of the conference during the 2025–26 season, Farmingdale took part in and hosted the 2026 NECHL Playoffs at Long Beach Ice Arena as an ACHA Men's D2 team due in part to issues regarding Buffalo's membership in the conference.

== Format ==
Teams play a 15 game league schedule, playing each of the other five teams three times in the regular season. At the conclusion of the regular season the league holds a post season tournament hosted by one of the member schools. The tournament is held over three days at a single venue with top-seeded teams receiving first round byes. The Memorial Cup and an automatic bid to the ACHA Men's Division I National Championship Tournament is awarded to the winner of the tournament.

== Membership ==
School	Location	Founded	Affiliation	Enrollment	Nickname	Primary conference
University at Buffalo	Buffalo, NY	1846	Public	28,192	Bulls	Mid-American Conference (D-I)
Canisius University	Buffalo, NY	1870	Private/Roman Catholic	5,152	Golden Griffins	Metro Conference (D-I)
Farmingdale State College	East Farmingdale, NY	1912	Public	10,106	Rams	Skyline Conference (D-III)
Rochester Institute of Technology	Henrietta, NY	1829	Private/Non-sectarian	13,861	Tigers	Empire 8 (D-III)
Rutgers University	New Brunswick, NJ	1766	Public	67,556	Scarlet Knights	Big Ten Conference (D-I)
Sacred Heart University	Fairfield, CT	1963	Private/Catholic	10,090	Pioneers	Metro Conference (D-I)
The College of New Jersey	Ewing, NJ	1855	Public	7,340	Lions	New Jersey Athletic Conference (D-III)

Note: Canisius, RIT, and Sacred Heart also field NCAA Division I hockey teams.

=== Former Members ===
- Penn State Berks, moved to the CSCHC
- Ithaca College, moved to the UNYCHL
- Binghamton University, moved to the UNYCHL
- Syracuse University, moved to the ESCHL
- St. Bonaventure University, moved to the UNYCHL
- SUNY Cortland, moved to the UNYCHL
- Cornell University, moved to the UNYCHL
- Niagara University, moved to the ESCHL
- SUNY Oswego, moved to the ACCHL

=== Conference Arenas ===
School	Hockey Arena	Capacity
Buffalo	Northtown Center	1,800
Canisius	LECOM Harborcenter	1,900
RIT	Frank Ritter Memorial Ice Arena	2,100
Rutgers	ProSkate Ice Arena	1,500
TCNJ	Tsai Field House	

== Championship results ==
Season	Date	Winner	Score	Runners–up	Venue	Regular season winner	Source(s)
2007–08	February 4, 2008	Oswego Lakers	4–2	Rutgers Scarlet Knights	Campus Center Ice Arena	Rutgers Scarlet Knights	
2008–09	March 1, 2009	Cornell Big Red	5–3	Penn State Berks	ProtecHockey Ponds	Penn State Berks; Rutgers Scarlet Knights	
2009–10	February 21, 2010	Binghamton Bearcats	4–0	Rutgers Scarlet Knights	Body Zone Sports Complex	Rutgers Scarlet Knights	
2010–11	February 20, 2011	Syracuse Orange	8–4	Rutgers Scarlet Knights	Campus Center Ice Arena	Rutgers Scarlet Knights	
2011–12	February 19, 2012	Cornell Big Red	4–3 (OT)	Syracuse Orange	Tennity Ice Skating Pavilion	Rutgers Scarlet Knights	
2012–13	February 24, 2013	Buffalo Bulls	8–7 (2OT)	Niagara Purple Eagles	Northtown Center	Niagara Purple Eagles	
2013–14	March 2, 2014	Niagara Purple Eagles	6–5	Canisius Golden Griffins	Northtown Center	Syracuse Orange	
2014–15	February 22, 2015	Niagara Purple Eagles	5–4	Buffalo Bulls	Tennity Ice Skating Pavilion	Niagara Purple Eagles	
2015–16	February 21, 2016	Syracuse Orange	6–3	Niagara Purple Eagles	Tennity Ice Skating Pavilion	Syracuse Orange	
2016–17	February 26, 2017	Niagara Purple Eagles	9–1	Canisius Golden Griffins	Harborcenter	Syracuse Orange	
2017–18	March 4, 2018	Buffalo Bulls	5–2	RIT Tigers	The Rink (Ithaca, NY)	Buffalo Bulls	
2018–19	March 3, 2019	Buffalo Bulls	2–1	Canisius Golden Griffins	North Buffalo Ice Rink	Buffalo Bulls	
2019–20	March 1, 2020	Niagara Purple Eagles	4–3	Oswego Lakers	North Buffalo Ice Rink	Niagara Purple Eagles	
2020–21	Not played due to the COVID-19 Pandemic						
2021–22	February 27, 2022	Niagara Purple Eagles	3–2	Oswego Lakers	Dwyer Arena	Niagara Purple Eagles	
2022–23	February 26, 2023	Buffalo Bulls	4–3	Canisius Golden Griffins	Tsai Field House	RIT Tigers	
2023–24	February 18, 2024	Oswego Lakers	5–2	Canisius Golden Griffins	Deborah F. Stanley Arena	Oswego Lakers	
2024–25	February 23, 2025	Oswego Lakers	11–0	RIT Tigers	LECOM Harborcenter	Oswego Lakers	
2025–26	March 1, 2026	Rutgers Scarlet Knights	6–2	Canisius Golden Griffins	Long Beach Municipal Ice Arena	Rutgers Scarlet Knights	

== ACHA National Tournament results ==
Year	Round	NECHL Team	Score	Opponent	Opponent Conference	Reference
2009	First Round	#16 Penn State Berks	2–14	#1 Lindenwood Lions	CSCHL	
2009	Consolation	#16 Penn State Berks	CXL	#12 Kent State Golden Flashes	CSCHL	
2010	First Round	#16 Rutgers Scarlet Knights	3–8	#1 Lindenwood Lions	CSCHL	
2010	Consolation	#16 Rutgers Scarlet Knights	5–6 (OT)	#15 SUNY Canton Kangaroos	ECHL	
2011	First Round	#15 Rutgers Scarlet Knights	1–12	#2 Davenport Panthers	GLCHL	
2011	Consolation	#15 Rutgers Scarlet Knights	6–8	#16 Slippery Rock	CHMA	
2012	Play-in Round	#16 Rutgers Scarlet Knights	1–5	#17 West Virginia Mountaineers	CHMA	
2013	Play-in Round	#19 Niagara Purple Eagles	0–1 (OT)	#14 Central Oklahoma Bronchos	WCHL	
2014	Play-in Round	#19 Syracuse Orange	1–6	#14 Oakland Golden Grizzlies	GLCHL	
2015	Play-in Round	#17 Buffalo Bulls	3–4	#16 Colorado Buffaloes	WCHL	
2015	Play-in Round	#15 Niagara Purple Eagles	7–2	#18 Robert Morris Colonials	CHMA	
2015	First Round	#15 Niagara Purple Eagles	1–4	#3 Central Oklahoma Bronchos	WCHL	
2016	Play-in Round	#18 Syracuse Orange	5–3	#15 Illinois Fighting Illini	CSCHL	
2016	First Round	#18 Syracuse Orange	2–3	#3 Stony Brook Seawolves	ESCHL	
2017	Play-in Round	#18 Syracuse Orange	3–4	#15 Midland Warriors	Independent	
2018	Play-in Round	#19 Buffalo Bulls	1–8	#14 Davenport Panthers	GLCHL	
2019	Play-in Round	#19 Buffalo Bulls	1–4	#14 Missouri State Ice Bears	WCHL	
2020	Play-in Round	#20 Niagara Purple Eagles	CXL (Note: The 2020 ACHA Division 1 National Tournament was cancelled due to the COVID-19 pandemic)	#13 Central Oklahoma Bronchos	WCHL	
2021 (Note: The NECHL did not play a 2020–21 season however some schools opted to play a shortened spring season. Canisius finished this period ranked 14th in the nation and was given a berth into the national tournament.)	First Round	#14 Canisius Golden Griffins	0–10	#3 Lindenwood Lions	CSCHL	
2022	Play-in Round	#18 Niagara Purple Eagles	3–7	#15 Ohio Bobcats	CSCHL	
2023	Play-in Round	#20 Buffalo Bulls	3–8	#13 Grand Valley State Lakers	GLCHL	
2024	First Round	#24 Oswego Lakers	4–1	#9 Niagara Purple Eagles	ESCHL	
2024	Round of 16	#24 Oswego Lakers	3–4 (OT)	#8 Ohio University Bobcats	Independent	
2025	First Round	#20 Oswego Lakers	3–2 (OT)	#13 Indiana Tech Warriors	WHAC	
2025	Round of 16	#20 Oswego Lakers	3–6	#4 Liberty Flames	Independent	

=== NECHL team tournament records ===
Teams that no longer participate in the Northeast Collegiate Hockey League are in italics.

Name	P	W	L	OTL	GS	GA	%W
Oswego State Lakers	4	2	1	1	13	13	50.00
Penn State Berks	1	0	1	0	2	14	0.00
Rutgers Scarlet Knights	5	0	4	1	16	39	0.00
Niagara Purple Eagles	4	1	2	1	11	14	25.00
Syracuse Orange	4	1	3	0	11	16	25.00
Buffalo Bulls	4	0	4	0	8	24	0.00
Canisius Golden Griffins	1	0	1	0	0	10	0.00

== See also ==
- American Collegiate Hockey Association
- List of ice hockey leagues
