= Simon Gray (disambiguation) =

Simon Gray (1936–2008) was an English playwright and memoirist.

Simon Gray may also refer to:

- Simon B. Gray, American college athletics administrator
- Simon Gray (businessman), British businessman
- Simon Gray (swimmer) (born 1959), retired British international swimmer

== See also ==
- Gray Simons (born 1939), American wrestler
- Simon Grayson (born 1969), English football former player
