= Kevan Guy =

Canadian ice hockey player

- Born: July 16, 1965 (age 60) Edmonton, Alberta, Canada
- Height: 6 ft 3 in (191 cm)
- Weight: 202 lb (92 kg; 14 st 6 lb)
- Position: Defence
- Shot: Right
- Played for: Calgary Flames; Vancouver Canucks
- NHL draft: 71st overall, 1983; Calgary Flames
- Playing career: 1985–1995

Kevan Brent Guy (born July 16, 1965) is a Canadian former professional ice hockey player who played in the National Hockey League for the Calgary Flames and the Vancouver Canucks. He also played several years in the minor International Hockey League.

== Playing career ==
A steady stay-at-home defender, Guy played his junior hockey with the Medicine Hat Tigers and was selected 71st overall by the Flames in the 1983 NHL entry draft. He signed with the Flames and turned pro in 1985, and made his NHL debut in the 1986–87 appearing in 24 games and recording 4 assists.

After another season split between Calgary and the minors, Guy was dealt to the Vancouver Canucks for the 1988–89 season. He spent his first full season in the NHL, appearing in 45 games for the Canucks and recording his first two career goals along with two assists. He spent two more seasons as a depth defender for the Canucks before being dealt back to Calgary near the end of the 1990–91 campaign.

Guy spent most of the next three seasons with the Salt Lake Golden Eagles, Calgary's minor-pro affiliate, appearing in just 3 games for the Flames in 1991–92. He also had a brief stint in Austria before retiring in 1995.

He appeared in a total of 156 NHL games, scoring 5 goals and 20 assists for 25 points. He also played 5 playoff games, four with the Flames and one with the Canucks, scoring one assist.

== Post-playing career ==
Following his career, Guy remained in Salt Lake, where he had spent much of his minor-league career, and became an electrician. He also served for a time on the coaching staff of Brigham Young University's hockey team. Guy is currently part of the coaching staff for the Utah Valley University men's ice hockey team.

Guy is married to Amee and now has 5 children. Emalee, Andee, Conlee, Jaydee, and Bohdee.

== Career statistics ==
=== Regular season and playoffs ===
			Regular season					Playoffs
Season	Team	League	GP	G	A	Pts	PIM	GP	G	A	Pts	PIM
1982–83	Medicine Hat Tigers	WHL	69	7	20	27	89	5	0	3	3	16
1983–84	Medicine Hat Tigers	WHL	72	15	42	57	117	14	3	4	7	14
1984–85	Medicine Hat Tigers	WHL	31	7	17	24	46	10	1	2	3	2
1985–86	Moncton Golden Flames	AHL	73	4	20	24	56	10	0	2	2	6
1986–87	Calgary Flames	NHL	24	0	4	4	19	4	0	1	1	23
1986–87	Moncton Golden Flames	AHL	46	2	10	12	38	—	—	—	—	—
1987–88	Calgary Flames	NHL	11	0	3	3	8	—	—	—	—	—
1987–88	Salt Lake Golden Eagles	IHL	61	6	30	36	51	19	1	6	7	26
1988–89	Vancouver Canucks	NHL	45	2	2	4	34	1	0	0	0	0
1989–90	Vancouver Canucks	NHL	30	2	5	7	32	—	—	—	—	—
1989–90	Milwaukee Admirals	IHL	29	2	11	13	33	—	—	—	—	—
1990–91	Vancouver Canucks	NHL	39	1	6	7	39	—	—	—	—	—
1990–91	Calgary Flames	NHL	4	0	0	0	4	—	—	—	—	—
1991–92	Calgary Flames	NHL	3	0	0	0	2	—	—	—	—	—
1991–92	Salt Lake Golden Eagles	IHL	60	3	14	17	89	5	0	1	1	4
1992–93	EC Graz	AUT	22	1	6	7	—	—	—	—	—	—
1992–93	Salt Lake Golden Eagles	IHL	33	1	9	10	50	—	—	—	—	—
1993–94	Salt Lake Golden Eagles	IHL	62	4	17	21	45	—	—	—	—	—
1994–95	Tallahassee Tiger Sharks	ECHL	6	0	5	5	0	—	—	—	—	—
1994–95	Denver Grizzlies	IHL	3	0	1	1	0	—	—	—	—	—
IHL totals			248	16	82	98	268	24	1	7	8	30
NHL totals			156	5	20	25	138	5	0	1	1	23
