= Ice Bears =

Ice Bears may refer to:

- Polar bear
- Knoxville Ice Bears, an American professional ice hockey team in Tennessee
- Missouri State Ice Bears, an American college ice hockey team

== See also ==
- Ice Bear, a fictional polar bear from We Bare Bears
