= Upstate New York Club Hockey League =

American collegiate hockey league

Upstate New York Collegiate Hockey League (UNYCHL)
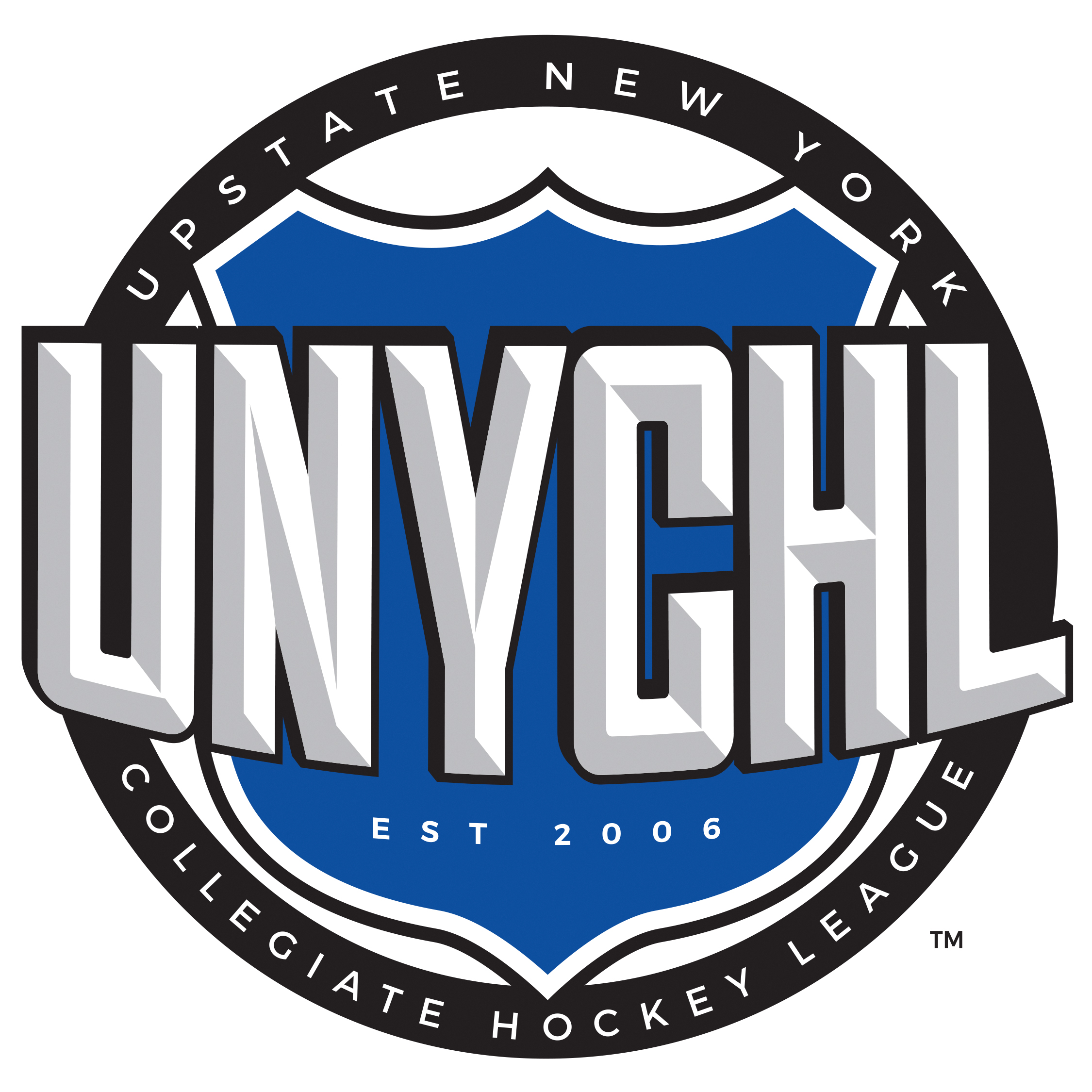
- Conference: CHF
- Founded: 2006
- Commissioner: Jon Marchese (since 2017)
- Sports fielded: Men's ice hockey
- Division: Division II
- No. of teams: 26
- Headquarters: Syracuse, New York
- Region: Northeast
- Most recent champions: Tier 1: Buffalo Bulls (2nd title); Tier 2: SUNY Niagara ThunderWolves (2nd title)
- Most titles: LeMoyne College (4 titles)
- Website: Official website Tier 2 website

The Upstate New York Collegiate Hockey League is a college ice hockey league comprising teams from smaller colleges and universities in and near Upstate New York that is affiliated with the Collegiate Hockey Federation (CHF). The league is based in New York State and has a majority of teams competing in-state along with some from neighboring Pennsylvania and Vermont.

== History ==
The league was founded by Andrew Musto in 2006 as a low-cost alternative to higher cost leagues. As of 2017 the league fee per team was $300. League fees are used for playoff ice time, referee fees, scorekeepers, and awards.

At the end of the 2016–17 season, Musto stepped down as commissioner and appointed Jon Marchese the new commissioner. The UNYCHL opened its 11th season with the biggest expansion in its history. The league grew to 23 teams with the additions of SUNY Albany, Gannon University, Mercyhurst University, Clarkson University, Niagara County Community College, Binghamton University and Syracuse University as well as the return of Alfred State College, Hilbert College and SUNY Canton. In addition the league was organized into three divisions based on geography to cut down travel.

Before the 2019–20 season, the league left the ACHA and has joined the Collegiate Hockey Federation.

The league also organizes a second-tier league called UNYCHL Tier 2, which launched with the 2018–19 season. This tier is for new programs in an effort to "provide local area teams an avenue to play competitive hockey while minimizing budgetary impacts and reducing travel costs." UNYCHL T2 holds ten teams which compete among one another for a separate league championship.

In February 2025, the UNYCHL announced a merger with the Super East Collegiate Hockey League (SECHL) for the 2025–26 season, with the two playing under the SECHL name in ACHA Men's Division 2. Once the merger with the UNYCHL is complete, the SECHL will have two divisions. The SECHL East Division will comprise the then-current six current SECHL members (Army (West Point), Clarkson University, Marist University, Montclair State University, Sacred Heart University, and Siena College) while the SECHL West Division will be made of the former UNYCHL teams. UNYCHL members Binghamton University, Niagara University, and St. Bonaventure University applied and were accepted into the ACHA, with other UNYCHL teams going through the ACHA application process. Teams in each SECHL Division will compete against one another and maintain separate divisional playoffs.

== Members ==
=== Tier 1 ===
Institution	Location	Founded	Affiliation	Enrollment	Year Joined	Nickname	Championships	Home Rink
East Division
Hamilton College	Clinton, New York	1793	Private	1,872	2010	Continentals	2010, 2018	Sage Rink-Delaney Team Center
Le Moyne College	Syracuse, New York	1946	Private	2,761	2006	Dolphins	2008, 2009, 2011, 2012	Meachem Ice Rink
SUNY Albany	Albany, New York	1844	Public	19,000	2017	Great Danes		Albany County Hockey Facility
Union College	Schenectady, New York	1795	Private	2,194	2012	Dutchmen		The Frank L. Messa Rink at Achilles Center
Central Division
Clarkson University	Potsdam, New York	1896	Private	4,300	2017	Golden Knights		Cheel Arena
Binghamton University	Vestal, New York	1946	Public Research University	17,292	2017	Bearcats		SUNY Broome Ice Center
Ithaca College	Ithaca, New York	1892	Private	6,969	2015	Bombers		The Rink
SUNY Cortland	Cortland, New York	1868	Public	6,858		Red Dragons		
Metro Division
Erie Community College	Williamsville, New York	1946	Community College	13,649	2018	Kats	2019	Cheektowaga Recreation Ice Arena
Niagara University	Lewiston, New York	1856	Private	3,763	2020	Purple Eagles		Dwyer Arena
St. John Fisher University	Pittsford, New York	1948	Private	2,871	2013	Cardinals	2007	Bill Gray's Regional Iceplex
SUNY Brockport	Brockport, New York	1867	Public	8,742	2013	Golden Eagles		The Tuttle North Ice Arena
University at Buffalo	Buffalo, New York	1846	Public	19,951	2014	Bulls	2015, 2020	Northtown Center
University of Rochester	Rochester, New York	1850	Private	6,304	2014	Yellowjackets	2014, 2016	Genesee Valley Sports Complex
West Division
Alfred State College	Alfred, New York	1908	Public	3,500	2017	Pioneers	2019	Olean Recreation Center
Buffalo State College	Buffalo, New York	1871	Public	11,000	2018	Bengals		Buffalo State Ice Arena
Canisius College	Buffalo, New York	1870	Private	3,464		Golden Griffins		
Penn State Behrend	Erie, Pennsylvania	1948	Public	5,050	2018	Lions		Mercyhurst Ice Center
St. Bonaventure	Allegany, New York	1858	Private	1,627	2018	Bonnies		William O. Smith Recreation Center
SUNY Fredonia	Fredonia, New York	1826	Public	5,100	2018	Blue Devils		Steele Hall Ice Arena

=== Tier 2 ===
Institution	Location	Founded	Affiliation	Enrollment	Year Joined	Nickname	Championships	Home Rink
East Division
ACPHS	Albany, New York	1881	Private	1,392	2015	Panthers		Albany Academy Field House
SUNY Canton	Canton, New York	1906	Public	3,550	2017	Roos		SUNY Canton Roos House
SUNY Oneonta	Oneonta, New York	1889	Public	8,000	2006	Red Dragons		Alumni Field House
Paul Smith's College	Paul Smiths, New York	1946	Private	1,000	2018	Bobcat		Saranac Lake Civic Center
West Division
Alfred State College	Alfred, New York	1908	Public	3,500	2017	Pioneers	2019	Olean Recreation Center
Geneseo	Geneseo, New York	1871	Public	5,240	2021	Knights		Ira S. Wilson Ice Arena (Merritt Athletic Center)
Medaille College	Buffalo, New York	1937	Private	2,600	2018	Mavericks		Dann Memorial Rink at Nichols School
SUNY Niagara	Sanborn, New York	1962	Community College	5,892	2017	Thunder Wolves	2020, 2022	Hyde Park Ice Pavilion
St. John Fisher University	Pittsford, New York	1948	Private	2,871	2013	Cardinals	2007	Bill Gray's Regional Iceplex
Gannon University	Erie, Pennsylvania	1925	Public	3,432	2017	Golden Knights		Erie Insurance Arena
Mercyhurst University	Erie, Pennsylvania	1926	Public	4,363	2021	Lakers		Mercyhurst Ice Center
University of Pittsburgh at Bradford	Bradford, Pennsylvania	1963	Public	1,564	2021	Panthers		Callahan Ice Rink

=== Former Members ===
Institution	Location	Founded	Affiliation	Enrollment	Year(s) Played	Nickname	Championships
Cazenovia College	Cazenovia, New York	1824	Private	1,000	2007–2012	Wildcats	
D'Youville University	Buffalo, New York	1908	Private	3,000	2011–2015	Spartans	
Hilbert College	Hamburg, New York	1957	Private/Catholic	1,089	2011–2015	Hawks	
Utica College	Utica, New York	1946	Private	3,084		Pioneers	
St. Lawrence University	Canton, New York	1856	Private	2,398		Saints	
Hobart College	Geneva, New York	1822	Private	1,928	2013–2017	Statesmen	2017
Onondaga Community College	Syracuse, New York	1961	Community	12,000	2013–2019	Lazers	
Skidmore College	Saratoga Springs, New York	1903	Private	2,500	2013–2019	Thoroughbreds	
SUNY Geneseo	Geneseo, New York	1871	Public	4,950	2013–2019	Knights	
Gannon University	Erie, Pennsylvania	1925	Private Non-Profit	4,412	2017–2019	Golden Knights	
Mercyhurst University	Erie, Pennsylvania	1926	Private University	4,400	2017–2019	Lakers	
Syracuse University	Syracuse, New York	1870	Private research university	21,970	2017–2019	Orange	
Colgate University	Hamilton, New York	1819	Private	3,000	2018–2019	Raiders	
Castleton University	Castleton, Vermont	1789	Public	2,100	2018–2019	Spartans	

== Seasons ==
Season	No. of teams	Top regular season record	Playoff Champion
2006–07			St. John Fisher Cardinals
2007–08			Le Moyne Dolphins
2008–09			Le Moyne Dolphins
2009–10	6	Hamilton Continentals (8–1–1)	Hamilton Continentals
2010–11	6	Le Moyne Dolphins (9–1–0)	Le Moyne Dolphins
2011–12	7	Le Moyne Dolphins (12–0–0)	Le Moyne Dolphins
2012–13	14	Le Moyne Dolphins (10–1–1)	Canton Kangaroos
2013-14			University of Rochester/Nazareth College
2014-15	16	Le Moyne and St. John Fisher College (12–2–0)	University at Buffalo
2015-16	14		University of Rochester/Nazareth College
2016-17	14	Skidmore (10–2–0)	Hobart College
2017-18	23	SUNY Geneseo and University of Rochester (10–2–0)	Hamilton Continentals
2018–19	Tier 1: 21 Tier 2: 10	Tier 1: Clarkson University (8–0–0) Tier 2: Alfred State (7-0-0-1)	Tier 1: Erie Community College Tier 2: Alfred State
2019–20	Tier 1: 21 Tier 2: 10	Tier 1: St Bonaventure (11–0–0) Tier 2: ACPHS (8–0–0)	Tier 1: University at Buffalo Tier 2: SUNY Niagara

=== 2015 Playoffs ===
The 2015 UNYCHL Playoffs were played February 20–22 at the home rink of each #1 and #2 seeds and 27th and 28th at Holiday Twin Rinks in Cheektowaga, New York.

Quarterfinals
1	St. John Fisher College	4
4	SUNY Brockport	3
2	University at Buffalo	7
3	University of Rochester	6
1	LeMoyne College	6
4	Skidmore College	4
2	Hamilton College	5
3	Union College	3

Semifinals
1	LeMoyne College	1
2	University at Buffalo	6
1	St. John Fisher College	4
2	Hamilton College	2

Finals
1	St. John Fisher College	3
2	University at Buffalo	4 (OT)

=== 2016 Playoffs ===
Quarterfinals
1	University of Rochester	9
4	SUNY Geneseo	2
2	University at Buffalo	3
3	St. John Fisher College	1
1	Hamilton College	6
4	Onondaga Community College	3
2	LeMoyne College	2
3	Union College	5

Semifinals
1	University of Rochester	10
3	Union College	6
1	Hamilton College	4
2	University at Buffalo	0

Finals
1	University of Rochester	7 (OT)
2	Hamilton College	6

=== 2017 Playoffs ===
Quarterfinals
1	University at Buffalo	5
4	SUNY Geneseo	1
2	University of Rochester	5
3	Hobart College	9
1	Skidmore College	8
4	LeMoyne College	5
2	Union College	9
3	St. Lawrence University	3

Semifinals
1	Skidmore College	4
3	Hobart College	9
1	University at Buffalo	5
2	Union College	4

Finals
1	University at Buffalo	2
3	Hobart College	3

== Awards ==
=== Coach of the Year ===
Year	Coach	Team	Division	Coach	Team	Division
2007	Andrew Musto	LeMoyne College				
2008	Henry Gaspe	Cazenvovia College				
2009	Andrew Musto	LeMoyne College				
2010	Andrew Musto	LeMoyne College				
2011	April Harper	SUNY Oneonta				
2012	Bob Shattell	LeMoyne College				
2013	Zachary Schwann	Skidmore College				
2014	Jim Doersam	University at Buffalo	West	Matt McDermott	Union College	East
2015	Randy Smallridge	St. John Fisher College	West	Bob Shattell	LeMoyne College	East
2016	Justin Niebel	University of Rochester	West	Charlie Boynton	Onondaga Community College	East
2017	Edd Kirchberger	University at Buffalo	West	Matt McDermott	Union College	East

=== League MVP ===
Year	Player	Team	Division	Player	Team	Division
2007	Matt Selover	St. John Fisher College				
2008	Dan Deacon	LeMoyne College				
2009	Dan Deacon	LeMoyne College				
2010	Bob Shattell	LeMoyne College				
2011	Leif Catania & Aaron Srebnik	Skidmore College				
2012	Eric Manley	LeMoyne College				
2013	Justin Cunningham	LeMoyne College				
2014	Brett Barton	University of Rochester	West	Charlie Gawne	Union College	East
2015	Andrew Simonelli	St. John Fisher College	West	Garrett Ordway	LeMoyne College	East
2016	Steve Sachman	SUNY Brockport	West	Matt Morgia	ACPHS	East
2017	Ryan Peterson	University of Rochester	West	Luc Chatelin	Skidmore College	East

=== Playoff MVP ===
Year	Player	Team	Division
2014	Brett Barton	University of Rochester	West
2015	Adam Oetinger	University at Buffalo	West
2016	Kyle Schwartz	University of Rochester	West
2017	Zach McCloskey	Hobart College	West
2019	Sean Kross	Erie Community College	Metro
2020	Ryan O'Donnell	University at Buffalo	Metro

== Records ==
=== Team Records ===
Least Penalty Minutes in a Season
60 - Skidmore College - 2015-2016
Team Goals Against Average in a Season
2.50 - LeMoyne College - 2014-2015
Team Goals For in a Season
123 - Hamilton College - 2014-2015

- These records began tracking at the beginning of the 2014 - 2015 season.

=== Individual Records ===
Most points in a Season
42 - Matt Morgia - ACPHS - 2015-2016
Most Goals in a Season
25 - Andrew Tullo - Union College - 2015-2016
Most Assists in a Season
20 - Matt Morgia - ACPHS - 2015-2016

- These records began tracking at the beginning of the 2014 - 2015 season.

== See also ==
- National Collegiate Hockey Association
- National Association of Intercollegiate Hockey
- List of ice hockey leagues
