= Western Collegiate Hockey League =

American club hockey league

- Conference: ACHA
- Founded: 2012
- Commissioner: Chris Perry
- Sports fielded: Ice hockey; men's: yes; women's: no
- Division: Division I
- No. of teams: 10
- Region: Western United States
- Website: https://www.westernchl.com/

The Western Collegiate Hockey League (WCHL) is a Division 1 collegiate ice hockey league in the American Collegiate Hockey Association (ACHA), which is the highest non-varsity Club Level for college hockey. The ACHL is made up of ten teams from the Western United States.

== History ==
In 2012, the WCHL was created and played its first season in the ACHA in 2013–14 with six founding member teams. Arizona, Arizona State, Central Oklahoma, and Oklahoma joined the league after competing as ACHA D-1 Independent programs. Those four teams, joined Colorado and Colorado State, who made the transition to from ACHA D-2 to ACHA D-1.

In the WCHL's first two years of competition, they won back-to-back ACHA D-1 National Championships, which was hosted at the Comerica Center in Frisco, Texas, for the 2019 and 2020 seasons.

In 2013–14, Arizona State defeated Robert Morris for the 2013–14 ACHA D-1 National Championship. And in 2014–15, Central Oklahoma defeated Stony Brook for the 2014–15 ACHA D-1 National Championship.

During the 2014 season, Arizona State announced their departure from the WCHL D-1 Club Level and established a formal NCAA D-1 ice hockey program for the 2015–16 season. This move left the WCHL with five members until the league announced the additions of Arkansas who created a new ACHA D-1 hockey club after years of success at the ACHA D-3 level, and Missouri State who moved up from the ACHA D-2 level on January 12, 2015.

Not to be confused, Arizona State's NCAA D-1 team is the only Independent men's hockey team in the country, but ASU also maintains both ACHA Club Level teams with our WCHL D-1 Sun Devils, and the PAC-8 D-2 Sun Devils, respectively.

In 2017, Central Oklahoma won their 2nd ACHA D-1 National Championship after defeating Ohio University.

Subsequently, Arkansas left the WCHL after the 2018–19 season, and (currently) no longer has a D-1 hockey club.

== Expansion ==
In September 2019, the WCHL expanded from seven to ten teams with the addition of University of Utah, UNLV, and Grand Canyon University for the 2020–21 season.

== Format ==
With ten member schools in the conference, beginning in the 2020–21 season, the WCHL is now divided into two geographic divisions for conference play. Each WCHL team will play a home-and-home series against every conference member within its division, as well as one home series and one road series against conference members from the opposite division, for a total of 20 WCHL conference games per season.

== Potential expansion candidates ==
The West Division: BYU Hockey, if they're willing to part ways with the Mountain West Collegiate Hockey League and elevate to D-1 competition. And Utah State University, if Grand Canyon decides to dropped down to D-2 competition.

The East Division: The University of Northern Colorado who are the 2017, 2018, and 2019 champions of the Big Mountain Hockey Conference at the ACHA D-2 level.

== Conference divisions ==
The West	The East
Arizona	Colorado
Arizona State	Colorado State
Grand Canyon	Missouri State
UNLV	Oklahoma
Utah	Central Oklahoma

== Current Teams ==
School	Location	Founded	Affiliation	Enrollment	Nickname	NCAA Conference	Colors
University of Arizona	Tucson, AZ	1885	Public	38,057	Wildcats	Big 12 (D-I)	
Arizona State University	Tempe, AZ	1885	Public	69,317	Sun Devils	Big 12 (D-I)	
University of Central Oklahoma	Edmond, OK	1890	Public	17,101	Bronchos	MIAA (D-II)	
University of Colorado	Boulder, CO	1876	Public	29,884	Buffaloes	Big 12 (D-I)	
Colorado State University	Fort Collins, CO	1870	Public	24,875	Rams	Pac-12 (D-I)	
Grand Canyon University	Phoenix, AZ	1949	Private For-Profit (Non-denominational)	20,500	Antelopes	WAC (D-I)	
Missouri State University	Springfield, MO	1905	Public	22,385	Bears	CUSA (D-I)	
University of Nevada-Las Vegas	Las Vegas, NV	1957	Public	30,704	Rebels	Mountain West (D-I)	
University of Oklahoma	Norman, OK	1890	Public	29,721	Sooners	SEC (D-I)	
University of Utah	Salt Lake City, UT	1850	Public	33,058	Utes	Big 12 (D-I)	

== Conference Arenas ==
School	Hockey Arena	Capacity
Arizona	Tucson Convention Center	6,791
Arizona State	New Multi-Purpose Arena (2022)	5,000
Central Oklahoma	Arctic Edge Ice Arena	700
Colorado	CU Student Rec Center	700
Colorado State	Edora Pool Ice Center (EPIC)	700
Grand Canyon	AZ Ice Arcadia	200
Missouri State	Jordan Valley Ice Park	700
Oklahoma	Artic Edge Ice Arena	700
UNLV	City National Arena; Henderson Event Center, (2022)	600; 6,000
Utah	Salt Lake City Sports Complex	2,500

== See also ==
- American Collegiate Hockey Association
- List of ice hockey leagues
