= Campus Center Ice Arena =

Ice arena in Oswego, New York, US

Coordinates: 43.452152°N 76.544076°W

Deborah. F. Stanley Arena and Convocation Hall
- Interactive map of Deborah. F. Stanley Arena and Convocation Hall
- Former names: Marano Campus Center Arena
- Location: Oswego, New York, United States
- Owner: SUNY Oswego
- Operator: SUNY Oswego
- Capacity: 2,500 (hockey)
- Surface: 200' x 90'(hockey)

Construction
- Opened: 2006
- Cost: $25.5 million

Tenant
- Oswego State Lakers

The Deborah. F. Stanley Arena and Convocation Hall is a 2,500-seat multi-purpose ice arena located in Oswego, New York, on the campus of SUNY Oswego. The arena is also the home to the Oswego Lakers Men's and Women's ice hockey teams competing at the NCAA Division III level in the State University of New York Athletic Conference (SUNYAC). As well as a men's club team competing at the ACHA Division I level in the Northeast Collegiate Hockey League, SUNY Oswego Figure Skating Club, and student recreation, intramural hockey, and broomball, and the synchronized skating team. The Arena also serves as a home for SUNY Oswego's convocation events. In addition to the college athletics and other events the Deborah. F. Stanley Arena and Convocation Hall is also the home to local community organizations such as the Oswego Figure Skating Club, and the Oswego High School boys' hockey team as well as recreational ice skating and figure skating.

The ice arena is part of the larger Marano Campus Center Complex that serves as a location for various student activities, food court, retail space, meeting rooms, the Educational Planning Center, radio, and the Al Roker TV Studio, home of WTOP, classrooms, a range of offices and new auditorium space. The arena portion of the building was built to replace the Golden Romney Field House, a largely dilapidated Quonset hut that had served as the main hockey arena from 1963 up to that point. The other portions largely replaced Hewitt Student Union, a 1970s era building built primarily to house the college's student organizations.
