= Eastern Collegiate Hockey League =

American club hockey conference

- Conference: ACHA
- Folded: 2012
- Commissioner: William Shannon
- Sports fielded: Ice hockey; men's: yes; women's: no
- Division: Division I
- No. of teams: 7
- Headquarters: Erie, Pennsylvania
- Region: East Coast
- Website: ECHL.com

The Eastern Collegiate Hockey League was an ACHA Division I club hockey league that consisted of teams in the Northeast United States. The league consisted of 6 teams from schools in New York and Pennsylvania.

== Format ==
The ECHL's had seven member teams that played a 10-game regular season conference schedule. The season concluded with the post-season ECHL Tournament. An automatic bid to the ACHA National Championship Tournament was awarded to the winner of the regular season.

== Former Teams ==
Institution	Location	Founded	Affiliation	Enrollment	Team Nickname	Primary conference
University at Buffalo	Buffalo, New York	1846	Public	28,192	Bulls	Mid-American Conference (D-I)
Canisius College	Buffalo, New York	1870	Private/Catholic	3,490	Golden Griffins	Metro Atlantic Athletic Conference (D-I)
SUNY Canton	Canton, New York	1906	Public	3,056	'Roos	Independent (USCAA)
Mercyhurst College	Erie, Pennsylvania	1926	Private/Catholic	3,226	Lakers	Pennsylvania State Athletic Conference (D-II)
Niagara University	Lewiston, New York	1856	Private/Catholic	3,746	Purple Eagles	Metro Atlantic Athletic Conference (D-I)
Rochester Institute of Technology	Henrietta, NY	1829	Private/Non-sectarian	13,861	Tigers	Empire 8 (D-III)
University of Rochester	Rochester, New York	1850	Private/Non-sectarian	9,027	Yellowjackets	University Athletic Association (D-III)

Note: Canisius, Mercyhurst, Niagara, RIT, and Robert Morris all have NCAA Division I hockey teams competing in Atlantic Hockey.

== Conference arenas ==
School	Hockey Arena	Location	Capacity
Buffalo	Amherst Ice Center	Amherst, NY	1,800
Canisius	Dann Memorial Rink	Buffalo, NY	1,000
Canton	Convocation and Athletic Recreation Center	Canton, NY	TBD
Mercyhurst	Mercyhurst Ice Center	Erie, PA	1,500
Niagara	Dwyer Arena	Lewiston, New York	1,400
RIT	Frank Ritter Memorial Ice Arena	Henrietta, NY	2,100
Rochester	Genesee Valley Park Sports Complex	Rochester, NY	1,200

== See also ==
- American Collegiate Hockey Association
- List of ice hockey leagues
