= Simon B. Gray =

American college athletics administrator

Current position
- Title: Athletic director
- Team: Niagara
- Conference: MAAC

Biographical details
- Born: Pittsburgh, Pennsylvania, U.S.
- Education: University of Richmond, Eastern Kentucky University

Administrative career (AD unless noted)
- 1998–1999: Boston College (Intern)
- 1999–2001: East Tennessee State (Media Relations)
- 2001–2005: Richmond (Assistant AD)
- 2005–2014: Eastern Kentucky (Associate AD)
- 2013: Eastern Kentucky (interim AD)
- 2014: Eastern Kentucky (interim AD)
- 2014–present: Niagara

Simon B. Gray is an American college athletics administrator. He has been the athletic director of Niagara University since May 16, 2014.

He earned a Bachelor of Arts degree in journalism from the University of Richmond in 1998 and a Master of Science degree in sport administration from Eastern Kentucky University.

Gray began his career as an athletic media relations intern at Boston College (1998–99) where he was the media contact for the ice hockey team. From 1999 until 2001 he was the director of athletic media relations at East Tennessee State University, and between 2001 and 2005 Gray was director of athletics public relations of the Richmond Spiders, at his alma mater, the University of Richmond. From July 2005 to July 2011 he served as Eastern Kentucky University's associate athletics director for advancement, and in August 2011, Gray was promoted to senior associate athletics director with two separate stints as the acting athletic director (January to July 2013 and January to May 2014), before joining the Niagara Purple Eagles as athletic director.
