= Niagara Purple Eagles =

Collegiate sports club in the United States

- University: Niagara University
- NCAA: Division I
- Conference: MAAC (primary); Atlantic Hockey America (men's ice hockey); Northeast Conference (bowling)
- Athletic director: Simon B. Gray
- Location: Lewiston, New York
- Varsity teams: 19
- Basketball arena: Gallagher Center
- Ice hockey arena: Dwyer Arena
- Baseball stadium: John P. Bobo Field
- Soccer stadium: Niagara Field
- Golf course: Niagara Falls Country Club
- Other venues: Classic Lanes in Kenmore (bowling)
- Nickname: Purple Eagles
- Colors: Purple and white
- Mascot: Monte
- Website: purpleeagles.com

The Niagara Purple Eagles are athletics teams that represent Niagara University in college sports. Part of the NCAA's Division I, the Purple Eagles field 19 varsity level teams. The Purple Eagles are full members of the Metro Atlantic Athletic Conference and the ice hockey-only Atlantic Hockey America, and are also members of the Northeast Conference for women's bowling. Previously, Niagara was a charter member of the Eastern College Athletic Conference-North (1979–1989). Between 1946 and 1958, Niagara was a member of the Western New York Little Three Conference.

In 2012, the women's ice hockey program was replaced by women's track and field. In 2023 women's bowling was added with a number of players from closing Medaille University, their head coach and their assistant coach.

== Sports sponsored ==
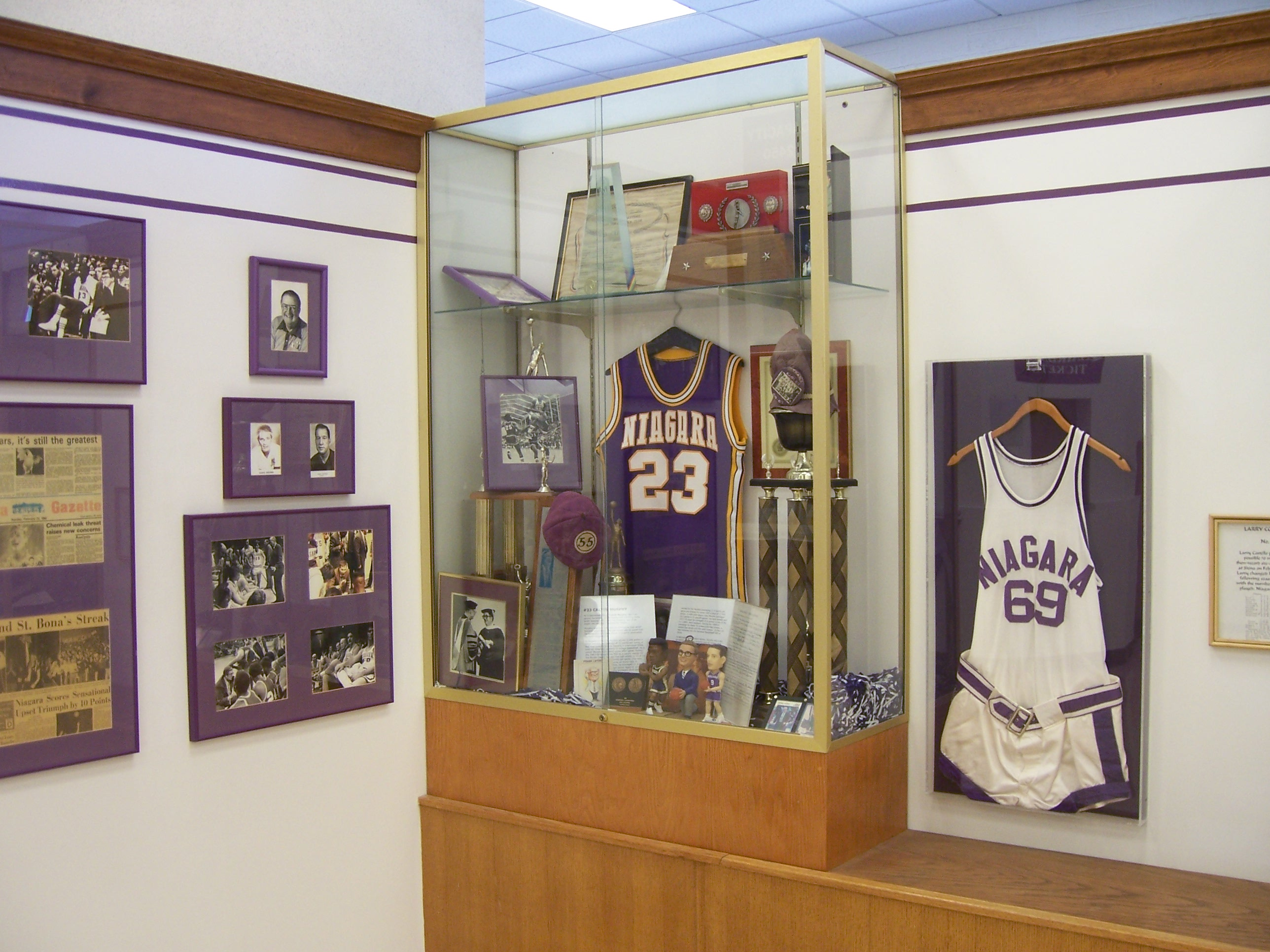
Basketball jerseys exhibited at the Niagara University Hall of Fame

Men's sports	Women's sports
Baseball	Basketball
Basketball	Bowling
Cross Country	Cross Country
Golf	Golf
Ice Hockey	Lacrosse
Rugby	Soccer
Soccer	Softball
Swimming	Swimming
Tennis	Tennis
	Track and field^{1}
	Volleyball
^{1} – includes both indoor and outdoor.

== Club teams ==
Teams competing at the club level are:

- Men's ice hockey D1 competes in the ESCHL of the ACHA.
- Men's ice hockey D2 competes in the UNYCHL of the AAU.
- Men's rugby competes in the Upstate Small College Rugby Conference (West Division) of the NSCRO.
- Women's rugby competes in the West Region Upstate New York Collegiate Rugby Conference of the NSCRO.
- Men's lacrosse competes in the Empire West D2 of the NCLL.

== Former sports ==
=== Football ===
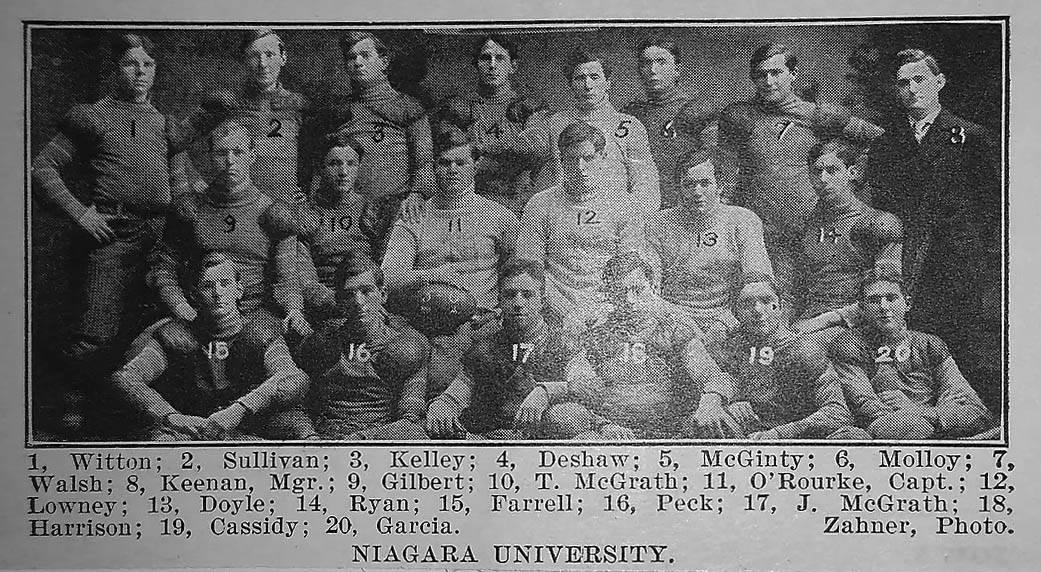
Niagara football team of 1905

Niagara first played football in 1897 and continued until suspending operations after the 1909 season. The Purple Eagles returned for the 1914 season and kept playing college football until World War II made the 1941 season Niagara's last until 1946. For the third time, the Purple Eagles suspended their team after the 1950 season, only to return in 1967. After 20 seasons of play in which the Purple Eagles suffered seven winless seasons, including six in a span of seven years, the Purple Eagles dropped football for the fourth and final time after the 1987 season. Over the span of 67 seasons, the team went won 182 games, lost 205, and had 31 ties. In the 1975 club season they played the Heritage Bowl in Worcester, Massachusetts, losing to Assumption College (27–7). The Eagles had 37 seasons in which they finished with more wins and ties than losses, though the Purple Eagles finished on an 18-game losing streak over three seasons, their last win occurring in October 1985.

The most wins they had in a season was 1902, in which they went 9–3–1, while the most losses they had in a season was 1922, when they finished 1–8–1.

==== Notable players ====
- Tom Cahill
- Dan DeSantis
- Bob Stefik

== NCAA postseason appearances ==
- Men's Hockey: 2013, 2008, 2004, 2000
- Women's volleyball: 2011, 2010, 2009
- Men's basketball: 2007, 2005, 1970
- Women's Tennis: 2005, 2003
- Women's soccer: 2006
- Women's ice hockey: 2002
- Softball: 1998
- Men's soccer: 2012

== Metro Atlantic Athletic Conference tournament championships ==
- Women's volleyball: 2011, 2010, 2009
- Men's basketball: 2007, 2005
- Women's soccer: 2006
- Women's tennis: 2005, 2003
- Women's lacrosse: 2024
- Baseball: 2024
- Softball: 1998
- Men's swimming and diving: 1994, 2025
- Women's swimming and diving: 2022, 2024, 2025
- Men's soccer: 2012

=== Metro Atlantic Athletic Conference regular-season titles ===
- Women's volleyball: 2011, 2010
- Women's tennis: 2009, 2003
- Men's basketball: 2013, 2005, 2001, 1999
- Baseball: 2024

== College Hockey America Tournament championships ==
- Men's ice hockey: 2008, 2004, 2000

=== College Hockey America regular-season titles ===
- Men's ice hockey: 2007, 2006, 2000

=== Atlantic Hockey Association regular-season titles ===
- Men's ice hockey: 2013

== All-Americans ==
- Calvin Murphy, 1970 (men's basketball)
- Tania Pinelli, 2002 (women's hockey)
- Juan Mendez, 2005 (men's basketball)
- Allison Rutledge, 2007 (women's hockey)
- Paul Zanette, 2011 (men's hockey)

== Rivalries ==
Niagara's fiercest rivals include:

- St. Bonaventure Bonnies
- Canisius Golden Griffins
