= BYU Cougars men's ice hockey =

- University: Brigham Young University
- Conference: Mountain West Collegiate Hockey League
- Arena: Peaks Ice Arena; Provo, Utah
- Colors: Blue and white
- Fight song: The Cougar Song

Conference regular season champions
- Mountain West Collegiate Hockey League; 2019

The BYU Cougars men's ice hockey team was a club hockey team which formerly represented Brigham Young University (BYU) in the Mountain West Collegiate Hockey League within Division 2 of the American Collegiate Hockey Association (ACHA). In 2021 BYU decided to cut ties with the organization and no longer sponsors a men's ice hockey team following the 2021-22 season, and the team was disbanded.

The BYU Cougars Hockey Team began in 1996 as the Provo IceCats, and ice hockey had been a part of Brigham Young University for many years prior, but at the beginning of the 2007–08 season, the Provo IceCats – a club team composed of Brigham Young students which had been around since at least 1970 – finally gained recognition as an official extramural sport at BYU. Upon being officially recognized, the Cougars hockey team began representing their school by wearing the BYU logo on their uniforms and in their advertising. Although the team was officially recognized and sponsored by the university, it was funded entirely through player fees, the contributions of private donors, ticket proceeds, and various forms of advertising.

In July 2021 BYU notified the Provo IceCats that it would not be renewing the contract for the IceCats to be sponsored by BYU and play as the university's collegiate ice hockey team. The team was allowed to play under the BYU banner for the 2021-22 season, but access to the BYU name and support would end after the conclusion of the season. BYU cited organizational and Title IX concerns in the press release confirming the end of affiliation, although the IceCats disputed this, organizing a petition for BYU to reconsider that garnered around three thousand signatures, but was ultimately unsuccessful in extending the contract.

== Record as BYU Affiliated Team ==
BYU Cougar Hockey
Year	Games Played	Win	Loss	Tie	Home Record	Away Record	GF	GA
2008–09	18	7	10	1	4–5–0	3–5–1	94	115
2009–10	29	9	20	0	5–7–0	4–13–0	118	167
2010–11	27	8	18	1	5–8–1	3–10–0	81	135
2011–12	27	1	25	1	1–12–0	0–13–1	69	247
2012–13	25	2	23	0	2–12–0	0–11–0	65	186
2013–14	30	4	25	1	2–12–0	2–13–1	80	194
2014–15	28	3	24	1	3–8–1	0–16–0	95	193
2015–16	29	6	22	1	3–11–0	3–11–1	71	181
2016–17	27	12	13	2	8–4–2	4–9–0	125	105
2017–18	28	12	13	3	9–7–1	3–6–2	128	91
2018–19	31	19	11	1	10–4–1	9–7–0	136	89
2019–20	31	13	15	1	8–7–1	5–8–3	113	130
2020–21̽	4	4	0	0	2–0–0	2–0–0	20	11

̽ Covid-19 Pandemic restricted season

== Venue ==
Peaks Ice Arena was the home venue for the BYU Cougars. It has two ice sheets and was an Olympic Venue for the 2002 Winter Olympics. The team maintained a locker room at Peaks for the exclusive use of the coaches and players. The venue has a seating capacity of 2,300.

Prior to the construction of Peaks Ice Arena, the IceCats played at the seasonal ice rink at Utah Lake State Park.

== Conference ==
The Cougars were members of the Mountain West Collegiate Hockey League since its inception in 2013. They were runners up to the Championship in 2018 and won the Championship in 2019.
