= Missouri State Ice Bears =

Missouri State University Ice Hockey
- City: Springfield, Missouri
- League: American Collegiate Hockey Association
- Division: Western Collegiate Hockey League
- Founded: 2001
- Home arena: Jordan Valley Ice Park
- Colors: Maroon and White
- General manager: Ryan Armstrong
- Head coach: Tom Winkler
- Media: websportsradio.com
- Affiliates: Missouri State Hockey Division III
- Website: missouristatehockey.com

Championships
- Playoff championships: ACHA Division II MACHA Gold Champions 2014 & 2015

The Missouri State Ice Bears are a college ice hockey team, representing Missouri State University and based in Springfield, Missouri. The team competes in the Western Collegiate Hockey League, part of the American Collegiate Hockey Association (ACHA) Division I.

== History ==
After back to back trips to the ACHA DII National Championships, the Bears were accepted into ACHA Division I hockey as well as the Western Collegiate Hockey League. The Western Collegiate Hockey League includes, Arizona, Arizona State, Colorado, Colorado State, Arkansas, Oklahoma, and Central Oklahoma. A team from the WCHL has won the ACHA National Championship during the 2013 - 2014 season, 2014–2015 season, and the 2016 - 2017 season.
