= Northtown Center =

Ice rink and arena in Amherst, New York

Northtown Center at Amherst
- Location within New York State Location within the United States
- Former names: Amherst Pepsi Center; Amherst Ice Center
- Location: Amherst, New York, United States
- Coordinates: 42°59′40″N 78°46′57″W
- Owner: Town of Amherst, New York
- Operator: Recreation Department
- Capacity: 1,800 (hockey)
- Surface: 200' × 85'; 200' × 98' (hockey)

Construction
- Opened: 1998

Tenants
- Buffalo Bulls (ACHA); Buffalo Lightning/Jr. Sabres (OJHL) (1998–2014); Buffalo Beauts (NWHL/PHF) (2019–2023)

The Northtown Center at Amherst, formerly the Amherst Ice Center and the Amherst Pepsi Center, is a 1,800-seat multipurpose arena in Amherst, New York, located adjacent to the University at Buffalo. The current sponsor is Northtown Auto, a Buffalo area chain of auto dealerships. The ice arena features NHL regulation-sized ice sheets as well as an Olympic-sized ice sheet, which is also capable of hosting sledge hockey. The main ice arena has a capacity of 1,800 with the other rinks having less capacity. The facility will melt the ice of one rink in the summer to create a roller hockey rink, sports training facility, restaurant, and pro shop.

It is the home to the University at Buffalo Bulls men's ice hockey team competing at the ACHA Division I level in the Eastern Collegiate Hockey League.

Until the completion of LECOM Harborcenter, the arena was the home of the Buffalo Jr. Sabres of the Ontario Junior A Hockey League and the practice facility for the Buffalo Sabres of the National Hockey League. The arena is also home to several local high school ice hockey teams, and is used by local figure skating clubs, youth, and adult recreational ice hockey leagues, as well as public skating. The U.S. and Canadian sledge hockey teams faced off in a three-game exhibition at the arena in February 2012.

| Preceded by numerous | Home of the Buffalo Jr. Sabres; 2014–present | Succeeded by LECOM Harborcenter |
| Preceded by LECOM Harborcenter | Home of the Buffalo Beauts; 2019–2023 | Succeeded by none |
