= Mountain West Collegiate Hockey League =

American collegiate ice hockey conference

- Conference: ACHA
- Founded: 2013
- No. of teams: 10
- Region: West
- Most recent champion: Montana State (3rd title) (2026)
- Most titles: Utah State (5 titles)

The Mountain West Collegiate Hockey League (MWCHL) is a collegiate hockey conference within Division 2 of the American Collegiate Hockey Association (ACHA). It is made up of ten universities throughout the Western United States. Four members are from the state of Utah, four from Montana and two from Idaho.

== History ==
Established in 2013, the MWCHL's founding members were Boise State University, Brigham Young University, the University of Denver, Montana State University, Montana Tech University, Utah State University and Weber State University.

Other previous members include the University of Wyoming and Grand Canyon University.

== Members ==
School	Location
University of Utah	Salt Lake City, UT
Boise State University	Boise, ID
Idaho State University	Pocatello, ID
Montana State University	Bozeman, MT
Montana Technological University	Butte, MT
University of Montana	Missoula, MT
University of Providence	Great Falls, MT
Utah State University	Logan, UT
Utah Valley University	Orem, UT
Weber State University	Ogden, UT

== Champions ==
Year	Champion	Runner-up	Result	Host
2014	Weber State	Montana Tech		Weber State
2015	Utah State	Denver		BYU
2016	Utah State	Weber State		Utah State
2017	Utah State	Wyoming		Weber State
2018	Utah State	BYU		BYU
2019	BYU	Utah State	2–0	Utah State
2020	Providence	Mary	3–2	Utah Valley
2022	Montana State	BYU	5–2	Weber State
2023	Montana State	Weber State	4–0	Montana State
2024	Utah State	Providence	3–2	Utah State
2025	Utah	Montana State	1–0	Utah
2025	Montana State	Utah	5–2	Utah

== See also ==
- American Collegiate Hockey Association
- List of ice hockey leagues
