= 2014 Nebraska Danger season =

Indoor Football League team season

- Owner: Charlie Bosselman
- General manager: Mike McCoy
- Head coach: Mike Davis
- Home stadium: Eihusen Arena; 700 East Stolley Park Rd. Grand Island, NE 68801

Results
- Record: 10-4
- Conference place: 2nd Intense
- Playoffs: Won Intense Conference Championship 45-15 (Ice); Lost 2014 United Bowl 46-63 (Storm)

The 2014 Nebraska Danger season was the fourth season for the Nebraska Danger as a professional indoor football franchise and their fourth in the Indoor Football League (IFL). One of nine teams competing in the IFL for the 2014 season, the Nebraska Danger were members of the Intense Conference. For the fourth consecutive year, the team played their home games under head coach Mike Davis in the Eihusen Arena at the Heartland Events Center in Grand Island, Nebraska.

== History ==
The Danger were successful in the 2013 regular season, clinching the Intense Conference and qualifying for the IFL playoffs for the first time. The team defeated the Colorado Ice to win the Intense Conference but lost the United Bowl to the Sioux Falls Storm. The Danger were named the IFL Franchise of the Year for 2013. Quarterback Jameel Sewell was named both the IFL Most Valuable Player and its Offensive Player of the Year.

== Off-field moves ==
In July 2013, the Danger extended head coach Mike Davis' contract to cover the 2014 IFL season.

In December 2013, the IFL announced that Danger general manager Mike McCoy would also serve as the league's Director of Business Development. McCoy will work to expand the league either through deals with existing teams or new expansion franchises.

== Roster moves ==
On September 19, 2013, the team announced that veteran offensive linemen Kayne Farquaharson, Darius Savage, and D'Angelo McCray, defensive linemen Pig Brown and Adrian Davis, defensive backs Darnell Terrell and Jamar Love, plus kicker Joe Houston would all return for the 2014 season. Farquaharson and Savage were 2013 first-team all-IFL selections.

On September 26, 2013, the team announced the signings of defensive lineman Chancey Aghayere, running backs Vondrell McGee and Mon Williams, and offensive lineman Ian Symonette.

On November 12, 2013, the tean announced that defenders Kane Elenburg and Deivon Tate would return to the Danger roster and that quarterback Cody Kirby and receiver Emory Addison had been added for 2014. Kirby was named the 2013 IFL Rookie of the Year for his efforts with the Chicago Slaughter.

On December 10, 2013, the Danger announced that they had re-signed kick returner Marcus Barnett for the 2014 season. At the same time, the team announced the signings of Troy Evans, Jacob Payne and Trevis Turner. Evans was named to the 2013 all-IFL first-team offense for his work with the Wyoming Cavalry.

Before the season began, the Danger signed defensive lineman Aronde Stanton, a Youngstown State alumni who had played briefly for the Calgary Stampeders of the Canadian Football League before injuring his shoulder.

== Awards and honors ==
On February 26, 2014, the IFL announced its Week 1 Players of the Week. Linebacker Pig Brown received an Honorable Mention for defense. On March 5, 2014, the IFL announced its Week 2 Players of the Week. Nebraska Danger quarterback Cody Kirby was named as the Offensive Player of the Week. Linebacker Pig Brown received a second Honorable Mention for defense. Kicker Joe Houston received an Honorable Mention for special teams play. On March 12, 2014, the IFL announced its Week 3 Players of the Week. Nebraska Danger quarterback Jameel Sewell received an Honorable Mention for offense.

On March 19, 2014, the IFL announced its Week 4 Players of the Week. Nebraska Danger defensive back Jamar Love was named as the Defensive Player of the Week and running back/kick returner Troy Evans was named as the Special Teams Player of the Week. Wide receiver Andre Piper-Jordan received an Honorable Mention for offense and linebacker Pig Brown received a third Honorable Mention for defense. On March 26, 2014, the IFL announced its Week 5 Players of the Week. Nebraska Danger quarterback Cody Kirby received an Honorable Mention for offense, linebacker Pig Brown received a fourth Honorable Mention for defense, and kicker Joe Houston received a second Honorable Mention for special teams play.

On April 2, 2014, the IFL announced its Week 6 Players of the Week. Nebraska Danger defensive lineman Claude Wroten received an Honorable Mention for his special teams play. On April 16, 2014, the IFL announced its Week 8 Players of the Week. Nebraska Danger kicker Joe Houston was named as the Special Teams Player of the Week. Quarterback Jameel Sewell received his second Honorable Mention for offense.

== Schedule ==
Key: Win Tie Loss Bye

=== Preseason ===
Week	Day	Date	Kickoff	Opponent	Results		Location
Week	Day	Date	Kickoff	Opponent	Score	Record	Location
1	Monday	February 10	7:05pm	Lincoln Haymakers (CPIFL)	W 68–13	1–0	Eihusen Arena

=== Regular season ===
All start times are local

Week	Day	Date	Kickoff	Opponent	Results		Location	Attendance
Week	Day	Date	Kickoff	Opponent	Score	Record	Location	Attendance
1	Friday	February 21	7:05pm	at Sioux Falls Storm	L 35–52	0–1	Sioux Falls Arena	4,875
2	Saturday	March 1	7:05pm	Bemidji Axemen	W 43–19	1–1	Eihusen Arena	5,275
3	Saturday	March 8	7:05pm	Texas Revolution	W 50–26	2–1	Eihusen Arena	4,019
4	Friday	March 14	7:05pm	Tri-Cities Fever	W 77–46	3–1	Eihusen Arena	3,650
5	Saturday	March 22	7:05pm	at Bemidji Axemen	W 48–38	4–1	Sanford Center	3,746
6	Sunday	March 30	7:05pm	at Colorado Ice	L 30–38	4–2	Budweiser Events Center	2,423
7	BYE							
8	Saturday	April 12	7:05pm	Texas Revolution	W 35–33	5–2	Eihusen Arena	4,380
9	BYE							
10	Friday	April 25	7:05pm	Wyoming Cavalry	W 73–20	6–2	Eihusen Arena	4,763
11	Saturday	May 3	7:05pm	at Tri-Cities Fever	W 66–62	7–2	Toyota Center	3,482
12	Friday	May 9	7:05pm	at Wyoming Cavalry	W 83–47	8–2	Casper Events Center	3,026
13	Saturday	May 17	7:05pm	at Green Bay Blizzard	W 63–44	9–2	Resch Center	3,589
14	Thursday	May 22	7:05pm	Colorado Ice	L 28–41	9–3	Eihusen Arena	3,787
15	Saturday	May 31	7:05pm	Sioux Falls Storm	L 20–45	9–4	Eihusen Arena	3,779
16	BYE							
17	Saturday	June 14	7:05pm	at Texas Revolution	W 33–29	10–4	Allen Event Center	3,510

=== Postseason ===
Week	Day	Date	Kickoff	Opponent	Results		Location	Attendance
Week	Day	Date	Kickoff	Opponent	Score	Record	Location	Attendance
Intense Conference Championship	Thursday	June 19	7:00pm	at Colorado Ice	W 45-15	1–0	Budweiser Events Center	1,000
2014 United Bowl	Saturday	June 28	7:00pm	at Sioux Falls Storm	L 46-63	1–1	Sioux Falls Arena	4,500

== Roster ==
2014 Nebraska Danger roster
Quarterbacks: 10 Jameel Sewell; 17 Kameron Smith; Running backs: 7 Troy Evans; Wide receivers: 1 Maurice Avery; 85 Marcus Barnett; 4 Kayne Farquharson; 23 Jacob Payne; 15 Andre Piper-Jordan; 20 O. J. Simpson	Offensive linemen: 75 D'Angelo McCray; 65 Solomon Orr; 72 Darius Savage; 71 Eddie Williams; Defensive linemen: 8 Adrian Davis; 99 Jervonte Jackson; 52 Aronde Stanton; 44 Claude Wroten	Linebackers: 13 Cornelius Brown; Defensive backs: 2 Ramon Broadway; 5 Dominick LaGrande; 9 Jamar Love; 6 Joe Sampson; 21 Darnell Terrell; Kickers: 25 Joe Houston	Injured Reserve: currently vacant; Exempt List: 5 Chip Reeves WR; 76 Trevis Turner OL; Roster updated May 29, 2014; 24 Active, 2 Inactive → More rosters

<

== Standings ==
2014 Intense Conference
	W	L	T	PCT	PF	PA	GB	STK
y - Colorado Ice	10	4	0	.714	708	503	0.0	L1
x - Nebraska Danger	10	4	0	.714	684	540	0.0	W1
Tri-Cities Fever	8	6	0	.571	761	671	2.0	W5
Wyoming Cavalry	1	13	0	.071	441	931	9.0	L10
