= 2014 Texas Revolution season =

Indoor Football League team season

2014 Texas Revolution (indoor football) season
- Owner: Championship Sports Group
- General manager: Tim Brown
- Head coach: Chris Williams
- Home stadium: Allen Event Center; 200 East Stacy Road; Allen, Texas 75002

Results
- Record: 3-11
- Conference place: 4th, United

The 2014 Texas Revolution season was the team's fifteenth season as a professional indoor football franchise, fifth in the Indoor Football League (IFL), and second as the "Texas Revolution". One of nine teams in the IFL for the 2014 season, the Texas Revolution competed in the United Conference for the second consecutive year. The team played their home games at the Allen Event Center in Allen, Texas. Chris Williams returned to the IFL as the Texas Revolution's director of football operations and head coach for 2014. The team started strong but faltered, compiling a 3–11 record and missing the playoffs. In the post-season, Williams resigned and the team announced their departure from the IFL.

== Off-field moves ==
The Revolution announced the hiring of new head coach Chris Williams on August 14, 2013. A 13-year coaching veteran whose last posting was the New Mexico Stars of the Lone Star Football League, Williams was hired after previous Texas Revolution head coach Billy Back led the team to a 5–9 record in 2013 and they failed to qualify for post-season play.

IFL veteran Brandon Blackmon returns as defensive coordinator and defensive backs coach. Jermaine Blakely is both offensive and defensive line coach, John Nevarez serves as running backs coach, and Stephon White does double-duty as offensive assistant and special teams coach.

== Roster moves ==
=== Off-season ===
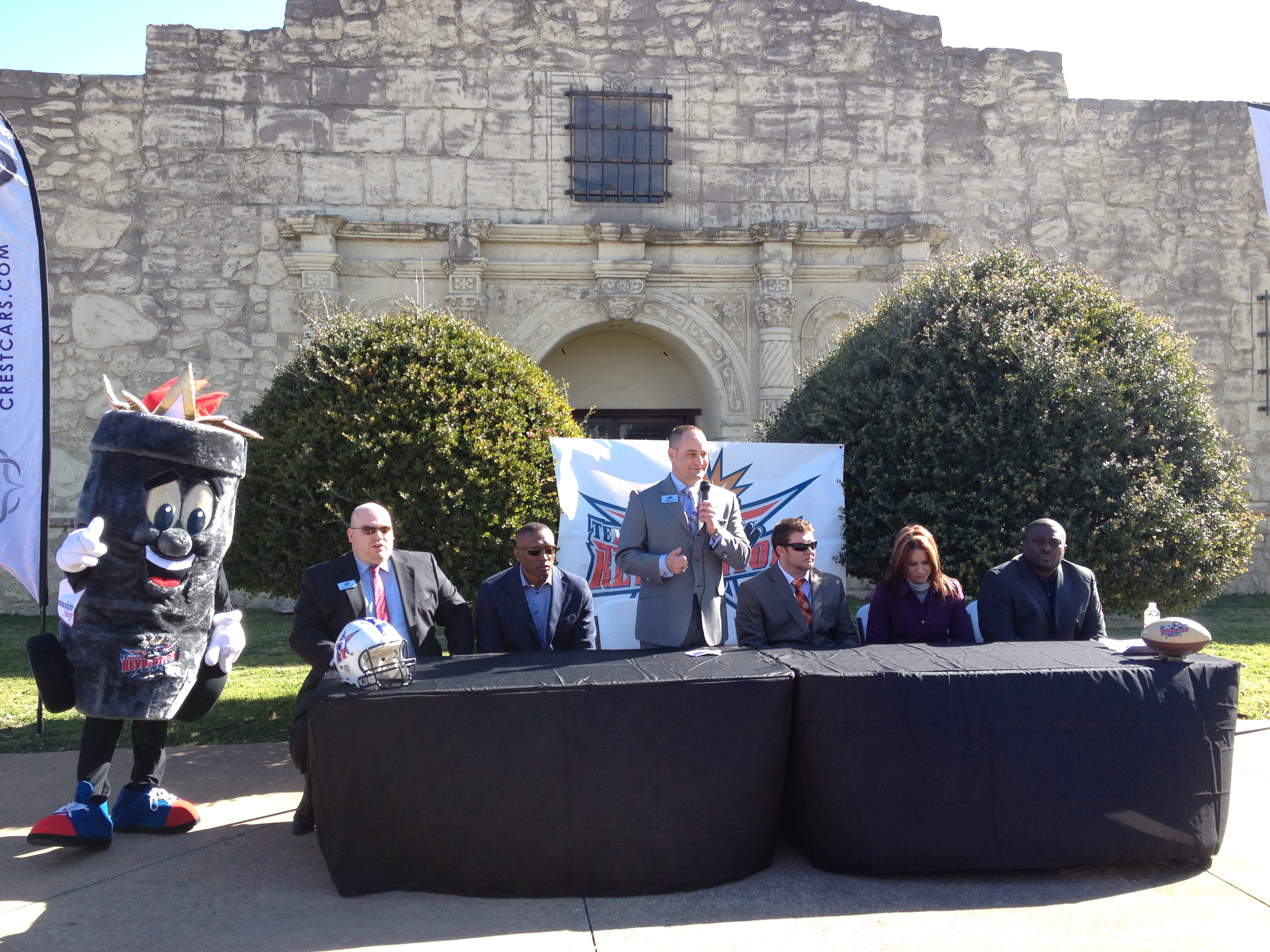
Team president Tommy Benizio, general manager Tim Brown, and head coach Chris Williams introduce running back Jennifer Welter on January 24, 2014.

On November 7, the team signed rookie quarterback Jimmy Coy. Coy lead the Saint Xavier Cougars to victory in the NAIA Football National Championship in 2011 and was named NAIA Football Player of the Year Award in 2012. In April 2013, Coy was signed by the Chicago Bears of the National Football League as their only quarterback at their rookie minicamp. In June, he briefly joined the Calgary Stampeders of the Canadian Football League.

Also on November 7, the team announced that it had re-signed key veteran Frankie Solomon, Jr. for the 2014 season. In 2013, Solomon was named to both the 1st Team All-IFL on Defense and 2nd Team All-IFL on Special Teams as a kick returner.

American Football Coaches Association's Division III All-American Team linebacker Javicz Jones of the University of Mary Hardin–Baylor signed with the Revolution on November 14. Jones played high school football at Morton Ranch High School in Katy, Texas.

The Revolution held open tryouts at Michael Johnson Performance in McKinney, Texas, on November 23, 2013. The team signed running back Bryson Porter (Midwestern State), cornerback Jamaal Wilson (University of North Texas), and cornerback Braelon Davis (Baylor, Odessa Roughnecks).

=== Pre-season ===
On January 24, the team signed running back Jennifer Welter as the first female player for a position other than kicker or placekick-holder on a men's professional football team. Welter, a Boston College graduate, is a veteran of several semi-pro women's football teams (including the Dallas Diamonds and Dallas Dragons) and was a gold medal-winning member of Team USA at the International Federation of American Football's Women's World Championship in 2010 and 2013. Welter played in the team's pre-season game versus the North Texas Crunch with -1 yards on 3 carries. On February 19, Welter was named to the team's regular season roster.

The team held another open tryout on January 25, 2014, in advance of the February 2014 start of training camp. In early February, the Revolution signed offensive linemen Jason Guillory (East Texas Baptist University) and Brandon Bishop (Texas College) plus linebacker Thomas Logan (Stillman). As the team prepared its regular season roster, Bishop was released on February 15 then Guillory, Logan, and Braelon Davis were released on February 19. In all, 20 players were trimmed from the pre-season roster in preparation for opening day.

On February 15, the team signed kicker Zeke Arevalo (St. Mary's College) and defensive back/linebacker Anquanius Frazier (East Texas Baptist University). On February 19, they signed defensive lineman Prince Hickman (Arkansas State) and offensive lineman Chris Brown (Northwestern State).

=== Regular season ===
Wide receiver/quarterback Josh Floyd was released on March 3. On March 4, the team signed defensive lineman Aaron Davis (Southern Methodist University) and released offensive lineman Chris Brown. Kicker Zeke Arevalo was released on March 4 then re-signed on March 6. Also on March 6, Texas re-signed wide receiver Grayln Crawford (Stephen F. Austin State) and offensive lineman John Cardenas (Blinn College) and signed quarterback/wide receiver Jeremy Sanders (Baylor). At the same time, running back Jen Welter was placed on the short-term injured reserve list and wide receiver Jason Thompson was listed with season-ending injuries.

On March 14, the team released offensive lineman John Cardenas and running back Xavier Stinson. On March 17, Texas signed wide receiver Oliver Young (South Carolina State). On March 20, the team re-signed veteran running back/wide receiver Ramonce Taylor. On March 21, the team released defensive linemen Aaron Davis and Johnathan Billups plus quarterback/wide receiver Jeremy Sanders. The team signed offensive lineman Justin Holcomb (Texas A&M–Commerce) plus wide receivers Damion Clark (Southern) and Nathaniel Dunn (Cisco College). On March 26, the Revolution signed defensive back Ray Berry (Mississippi Valley State) and offensive lineman Ron Jackson (University of Minnesota–Crookston). The same day, the team released offensive lineman Justin Holcomb and wide receiver Oliver Young.

On April 7, the team signed defensive back Jerell Norton (University of Arkansas) and released wide receiver Graylin Crawford. On April 9, the Revolution signed quarterback Kewan Dewberry (Morris Brown College) and re-signed wide receiver Ashlan Davis (University of Tulsa/Montreal Alouettes) and released wide receivers Nathaniel Dunn and Damion Clark. On April 10, the team signed wide receiver Will Cole (Oklahoma State) and defensive lineman Johnathon Elmo. The same day, they released defensive back Ray Berry and wide receiver/defensive back Jamaal Wilson. On April 16, the team signed Allen, Texas, native Nathan Dick (Central Arkansas) as a quarterback while starter Jimmy Coy recovers from injuries. At the same time, the team again released wide receiver Ashlan Davis. On April 17, the Revolution activated Jen Welter from the injured reserve list and re-signed offensive lineman Chris Brown (Northwestern State) while releasing defensive lineman Johnathon Elmo and wide receiver Will Cole.

== Awards and honors ==
On February 26, 2014, the IFL announced its Week 1 Players of the Week. Quarterback Jimmy Coy was named Offensive Player of the Week. The league cited his 20-of-27 passing for 204 yards and 5 touchdowns in leading the Revolution to victory on opening night. Defensive back Frankie Solomon Jr. was named Defensive Player of the Week. The league cited his opening night performance as "one of the most impressive single game performances in IFL history". Solomon also received an Honorable Mention for his special teams play. Wide receiver Clinton Solomon received an Honorable Mention for his offensive performance while defensive lineman Nick Johnson got the same for his defensive work.

On March 12, 2014, the IFL announced its Week 3 Players of the Week. Texas Revolution wide receiver Clinton Solomon received a second Honorable Mention for offense. Kick returner Frankie Solomon Jr. received an Honorable Mention for special teams play. On March 26, 2014, the IFL announced its Week 5 Players of the Week. Texas Revolution wide receiver Clinton Solomon was named as the Offensive Player of the Week. Quarterback Jimmy Coy received an Honorable Mention for offense, linebacker Danny Mason received an Honorable Mention for defense, and kick returner Ramonce Taylor received an Honorable Mention for special teams play.

On April 2, 2014, the IFL announced its Week 6 Players of the Week. Texas Revolution wide receiver Clinton Solomon received an Honorable Mention for offense, his third this season. Linebacker Danny Mason received an Honorable Mention for defense, his second this season. On April 16, 2014, the IFL announced its Week 8 Players of the Week. Honorable mentions were awarded to Texas Revolution wide receiver Ramonce Taylor for offense, linebacker Danny Mason for defense (his third), and kicker Zeke Arevalo for special teams play. On April 23, 2014, the IFL announced its Week 9 Players of the Week. Texas Revolution wide receiver Ramonce Taylor received an Honorable Mention for offense.

== Schedule ==
Key: Win Tie Loss Bye

=== Pre-season ===
Week	Day	Date	Kickoff	Opponent	Results		Location	Attendance
Week	Day	Date	Kickoff	Opponent	Score	Record	Location	Attendance
1	Saturday	February 15	7:00pm	North Texas Crunch (APFL)	W 64–30	1–0	Allen Event Center	NA

=== Regular season ===
Week	Day	Date	Kickoff	Opponent	Results		Location	Attendance
Week	Day	Date	Kickoff	Opponent	Score	Record	Location	Attendance
1	Friday	February 21	7:00pm	Cedar Rapids Titans	W 47–38	1–0	Allen Event Center	2,722
2	BYE							
3	Saturday	March 8	7:00pm	at Nebraska Danger	L 26–50	1–1	Eihusen Arena	4,019
4	BYE							
5	Sunday	March 23	7:00pm	Green Bay Blizzard	W 57–40	2–1	Allen Event Center	3,418
6	Friday	March 28	8:05pm	at Wyoming Cavalry	L 24–28	2–2	Casper Events Center	2,800
7	BYE							
8	Saturday	April 12	7:00pm	at Nebraska Danger	L 33–35	2–3	Eihusen Arena	4,380
9	Saturday	April 19	7:00pm	Colorado Ice	L 42–69	2–4	Allen Event Center	3,388
10	Friday	April 25	7:00pm	Cedar Rapids Titans	L 57–59	2–5	Allen Event Center	3,511
11	Saturday	May 3	7:05pm	at Cedar Rapids Titans	L 35–49	2–6	U.S. Cellular Center	3,876
12	Saturday	May 10	7:00pm	at Colorado Ice	L 34–55	2–7	Budweiser Events Center	2,276
13	Saturday	May 17	7:00pm	Tri-Cities Fever	L 34–55	2–8	Allen Event Center	3,691
14	Saturday	May 24	7:00pm	Sioux Falls Storm	L 42–69	2–9	Allen Event Center	3,712
15	Saturday	May 31	7:05pm	at Bemidji Axemen	W 43–27	3–9	Sanford Center	2,539
16	Saturday	June 7	7:05pm	at Sioux Falls Storm	L 29–34	3–10	Sioux Falls Arena	3,000
17	Saturday	June 14	7:00pm	Nebraska Danger	L 29–33	3–11	Allen Event Center	3,510

== Roster ==
2014 Texas Revolution roster
Quarterbacks: 8 William Cole; 6 Kewan Dewberry; Running backs: 14 Jordan Brown; 2 Darius Fudge; 47 Jennifer Welter; Wide receivers: 3 Damion Clark; 1 Clinton Solomon; 4 Jason Thompson; - Ramonce Taylor	Offensive linemen: 72 Martineus Albert; 79 D. J. Brandel; -- Xavier Pete; Defensive linemen: 50 Johnathon Elmo; 90 Bryan Glenn; 56 Nick Johnson; -- Jason Sutherland	Linebackers: 5 Javicz Jones; 55 DeMario Dixon; Defensive backs: -- Braelon Davis; 7 Anquanius Frazier; 23 David James II; -- Jerell Norton; 15 Frankie Solomon Jr.; -- Anthony Webb; -- Jamaal Wilson; Kickers: 10 Zeke Arevalo	Injured Reserve: 9 Jimmy Coy QB; Exempt List: -- Marcus Jackson QB; rookies in italics Roster updated June 5, 2014; 25 Active, 2 Inactive → More rosters

== Standings ==
2014 United Conference
	W	L	T	PCT	PF	PA	GB	STK
y - Sioux Falls Storm	13	1	0	.929	754	500	0.0	L1
x - Cedar Rapids Titans	11	3	0	.786	689	597	2.0	W2
Bemidji Axemen	5	9	0	.357	592	624	8.0	L5
Texas Revolution	3	11	0	.214	532	641	10.0	L2
Green Bay Blizzard	2	12	0	.143	615	769	11.0	W1
