= 2014 Wyoming Cavalry season =

Indoor Football League team season

- Owner: Mike and Argeri Layton
- General manager: Mike Layton
- Head coach: Ryan Lingenfelder
- Home stadium: Casper Events Center; 1 Events Drive; Casper, Wyoming 82601

Results
- Record: 1-13
- Division place: Intense
- Conference place: 4th

The 2014 Wyoming Cavalry season is the team's fifteenth season as a professional indoor football franchise and fourth in the current Indoor Football League (IFL). One of nine teams competing in the IFL for the 2014 season, the Wyoming Cavalry are members of the Intense Conference. Led by head coach Ryan Lingenfelder, the team plays their home games at the Casper Events Center in Casper, Wyoming.

== Awards and honors ==
On March 5, 2014, the IFL announced its Week 2 Players of the Week. Wyoming Cavalry linebacker David Stlouis received an Honorable Mention for defense. On March 12, 2014, the IFL announced its Week 3 Players of the Week. Wyoming Cavalry kick returner Justin Cooper received an Honorable Mention for special teams play. On March 19, 2014, the IFL announced its Week 4 Players of the Week. Wyoming Cavalry wide receiver Samuel Charles received an Honorable Mention for offense.

On April 2, 2014, the IFL announced its Week 6 Players of the Week. Wyoming Cavalry defensive lineman Bryson Kelly was named as the Defensive Player of the Week. On April 9, 2014, the IFL announced its Week 7 Players of the Week. Wyoming Cavalry kick returner Vincent Taylor was named as the Special Teams Player of the Week. Quarterback Sam Durley received an Honorable Mention for offense. Linebacker Bruna Foster and defensive back Jahmil Taylor each received an Honorable Mention for special teams play.

On April 16, 2014, the IFL announced its Week 8 Players of the Week. Wyoming Cavalry defensive back Jahmil Taylor received his second Honorable Mention of the season but his first for defense.

== Schedule ==
Key: Win Tie Loss Bye

=== Regular season ===
All start times are local to home team

Week	Day	Date	Kickoff	Opponent	Results		Location	Attendance
Week	Day	Date	Kickoff	Opponent	Score	Record	Location	Attendance
1	BYE							
2	Friday	February 28	7:05pm	at Tri-Cities Fever	L 26–69	0–1	Toyota Center	4,407
3	Saturday	March 8	12:00pm	at Colorado Ice	L 22–73	0–2	Budweiser Events Center	1,872
4	Saturday	March 15	7:05pm	at Bemidji Axemen	L 49–92	0–3	Sanford Center	3,675
5	BYE							
6	Friday	March 28	7:05pm	Texas Revolution	W 28–24	1–3	Casper Events Center	2,800
7	Friday	April 4	7:05pm	Colorado Ice	L 50–51	1–4	Casper Events Center	2,437
8	Friday	April 11	7:05pm	Bemidji Axemen	L 14–33	1–5	Casper Events Center	2,617
9	Saturday	April 19	7:05pm	at Sioux Falls Storm	L 29–64	1–6	Sioux Falls Arena	4,524
10	Friday	April 25	7:05pm	at Nebraska Danger	L 20–73	1–7	Eihusen Arena	4,763
11	Friday	May 2	7:05pm	Sioux Falls Storm	L 51–69	1–8	Casper Events Center	1,914
12	Friday	May 9	7:05pm	Nebraska Danger	L 47–83	1–9	Casper Events Center	3,026
13	Saturday	May 17	6:00pm	at Colorado Ice	L 12–73	1–10	Budweiser Events Center	2,140
14	Saturday	May 24	7:05pm	at Tri-Cities Fever	L 30–94	1–11	Toyota Center	3,434
15	Friday	May 30	7:05pm	Colorado Ice	L 28–69	1–12	Casper Events Center	1,745
16	Friday	June 6	7:05pm	Tri-Cities Fever	L 35–64	1–13	Casper Events Center	1,550
17	BYE							

== Roster ==
2014 Wyoming Cavalry roster
Quarterbacks: 17 Sam Durley; Running backs: 24 Anthony Carter; 29 Daryl Valdez; Wide receivers: 4 Samuel Charles; 3 Ricardo Johnson; 5 Mychal Lemon; 7 Desmond Marrs; 1 Rolandis Woodland	Offensive linemen: 62 Will Lawrence; 57 Nathan Perdue; 66 Walter Stuller; Defensive linemen: 78 Eddie Aiono; 90 Kenny Horsley; 92 Mackenzie Jacobs; 95 Joe Laukaitis; 23 Jahmil Taylor; 98 Euylan Welch	Linebackers: 22 David St. Louis; Defensive backs: 32 Clarence Laster; 20 Brian Smith; 21 Nick Taylor; 8 Vincent Taylor]; 25 Abraham Woodard; Kickers: 9 Blake Erickson	Injured Reserve: currently vacant; Exempt List: currently vacant; Refused to report: 6 D. A. Allen WR; rookies in italics Roster updated May 28, 2014; 24 Active, 1 Inactive → More rosters

== Standings ==
2014 Intense Conference
	W	L	T	PCT	PF	PA	GB	STK
y - Colorado Ice	10	4	0	.714	708	503	0.0	L1
x - Nebraska Danger	10	4	0	.714	684	540	0.0	W1
Tri-Cities Fever	8	6	0	.571	761	671	2.0	W5
Wyoming Cavalry	1	13	0	.071	441	931	9.0	L10
