= 2014 Indoor Football League season =

2014 IFL season
- League: Indoor Football League
- Sport: Indoor Football
- Duration: February 21, 2014 – June 14, 2014
- Number of teams: 9

Regular season
- Season MVP: Willie Copeland (Colorado)

Playoffs
- Intense champions: Nebraska Danger
- Intense runners-up: Colorado Ice
- United champions: Sioux Falls Storm
- United runners-up: Cedar Rapids Titans

2014 United Bowl Championship
- Champions: Sioux Falls Storm
- Runners-up: Nebraska Danger
- Finals MVP: Chris Dixon

IFL seasons
- ← 2013 2015 →

The 2014 Indoor Football League season was the sixth season of the Indoor Football League (IFL). Playing with nine teams in two conferences spread across the United States, the league's regular season kicked off on February 21, 2014, when the reigning league champion Sioux Falls Storm played host to the Nebraska Danger. The regular season ended 17 weeks later on June 21, 2014, with the Nebraska Danger visiting the Texas Revolution.

== Teams ==
For 2014, the IFL maintained its two-conference no-divisions format with each of 9 teams scheduled to play 14 games during the 17-week regular season. That was the same number of teams as played in the 2013 IFL season. The Minnesota-based Bemidji Axemen expansion team replaced the Chicago Slaughter which returned to the Continental Indoor Football League for the 2014 season.

=== United Conference ===
Team	Location	Arena (Capacity)
Bemidji Axemen	Bemidji, Minnesota	Sanford Center (4,700)
Cedar Rapids Titans	Cedar Rapids, Iowa	U.S. Cellular Center (6,900)
Green Bay Blizzard	Ashwaubenon, Wisconsin	Resch Center (8,621)
Sioux Falls Storm	Sioux Falls, South Dakota	Sioux Falls Arena (4,700)
Texas Revolution	Allen, Texas	Allen Event Center (6,275)

=== Intense Conference ===
Team	Location	Arena (Capacity)
Colorado Ice	Loveland, Colorado	Budweiser Events Center (7,200)
Nebraska Danger	Grand Island, Nebraska	Eihusen Arena (7,500)
Tri-Cities Fever	Kennewick, Washington	Toyota Center (5,970)
Wyoming Cavalry	Casper, Wyoming	Casper Events Center (8,395)

== Personnel ==
In mid-December 2013, Michael Allshouse moved up from assistant to commissioner of the IFL, replacing Robert Loving who is now the league's chief financial officer. For 2014, Mike McCoy serves as the Director of Business Development and Tom Falcinelli returns as the Director of Officiating.

== Expansion ==
In January 2014, the league announced that the Billings Wolves would join the league for the 2015 season. The Wolves played their home games at Rimrock Auto Arena at MetraPark in Billings, Montana. The city was previously home to the Billings Outlaws who folded after a tornado heavily damaged their home arena.

== Standings ==
2014 Intense Conference
	W	L	T	PCT	PF	PA	GB	STK
y - Colorado Ice	10	4	0	.714	708	503	0.0	L1
x - Nebraska Danger	10	4	0	.714	684	540	0.0	W1
Tri-Cities Fever	8	6	0	.571	761	671	2.0	W5
Wyoming Cavalry	1	13	0	.071	441	931	9.0	L10

2014 United Conference
	W	L	T	PCT	PF	PA	GB	STK
y - Sioux Falls Storm	13	1	0	.929	754	500	0.0	L1
x - Cedar Rapids Titans	11	3	0	.786	689	597	2.0	W2
Bemidji Axemen	5	9	0	.357	592	624	8.0	L5
Texas Revolution	3	11	0	.214	532	641	10.0	L2
Green Bay Blizzard	2	12	0	.143	615	769	11.0	W1

== Playoffs ==
Conference Championships
2	Nebraska	45
1	Colorado	15
2	Cedar Rapids	36
1	Sioux Falls	73

2014 United Bowl
I2	Nebraska	46
U1	Sioux Falls	63

== Awards ==
=== Individual season awards ===
Award	Winner	Position	Team
Most Valuable Player	Willie Copeland	Quarterback	Colorado Ice
Offensive Player of the Year	Chris Dixon	Quarterback	Sioux Falls Storm
Defensive Player of the Year	Tyler Knight	Linebacker	Sioux Falls Storm
Special teams Player of the Year	Rockne Belmonte	Kicker	Cedar Rapids Titans
Rookie of the Year	Nathan Wara	Quarterback	Green Bay Blizzard
Adam Pringle Award	Cody Kirby	Quarterback	Bemidji Axemen
Coach of the Year	Heron O'Neal	Head coach	Colorado Ice
Executive of the Year	Charlies Bosselman	Owner	Nebraska Danger

=== 1st Team All-IFL ===
Offense
Quarterback	Willie Copeland, Colorado
Running back	LaRon Council, Cedar Rapids
Wide receiver	Clinton Solomon, Texas; Ryan Balentine, Bemidji; Kyle Kaiser, Colorado
Offensive tackle	Myniya Smith, Sioux Falls; Darius Savage, Nebraska
Center	Charlie Sanders, Sioux Falls

Defense
Defensive line	Claude Wroten, Nebraska; Kyle Jenkins, Cedar Rapids; Jordan Morgan, Bemidji
Linebacker	Tyler Knight, Sioux Falls; Joe Thornton, Colorado
Defensive back	Frankie Solomon, Jr., Texas; Jamar Love, Nebraska; Donyae Coleman, Tri-Cities

Special teams
Kicker	Rockne Belmonte, Cedar Rapids
Kick returner	Tory Harrison, Sioux Falls

=== 2nd Team All-IFL ===
Offense
Quarterback	Chris Dixon, Sioux Falls
Running back	Keithon Flemming, Tri-Cities
Wide receiver	Samuel Charles, Wyoming; Donte Sawyer, Green Bay; Kayne Farquharson, Nebraska
Offensive tackle	Albert Erni, Jr., Cedar Rapids; Sanford Banks, Colorado
Center	William Maxwell, Green Bay

Defense
Defensive end	Demario Dixon, Texas; Eze Obiora, Sioux Falls; Jason Jones, Colorado
Linebacker	Corneilus Brown, Nebraska; Javicz Jones, Texas
Defensive back	Kyle Theret, Sioux Falls; Corey Sample, Colorado; Lionell Singleton, Tri-Cities

Special teams
Kicker	Parker Douglass, Sioux Falls
Kick returner	Robert Brown, Cedar Rapids
