= 2014 Sioux Falls Storm season =

Indoor Football League team season

- Owner: Todd Tryon
- Head coach: Kurtiss Riggs
- Home stadium: Sioux Falls Arena; 1201 North West Avenue; Sioux Falls, SD 57104

Results
- Record: 13-1
- Conference place: 1st United
- Playoffs: Won United Conference Championship 73-36 (Titans); Won 2014 United Bowl 63-46 (Danger)

The 2014 Sioux Falls Storm season was the team's fifteenth season as a professional indoor football franchise and sixth in the Indoor Football League (IFL). One of nine teams that competed in the IFL for the 2014 season, the Sioux Falls Storm were members of the United Conference.

Led by head coach Kurtiss Riggs, the Storm played their home games at the Sioux Falls Arena in Sioux Falls, South Dakota. Sioux Falls entered the 2014 season following consecutive wins in the league's "United Bowl" championship game in 2011, 2012, and 2013.

== Off-field moves ==
In mid-April 2014, the team announced that this season would be its last at the aging Sioux Falls Arena. In 2015, the Storm will follow the Sioux Falls Stampede of the United States Hockey League to the newly constructed Denny Sanford Premier Center.

== Roster moves ==
Quarterback Chris Dixon, a three-time IFL MVP, returned to the Storm after one season in the Arena Football League. Dixon previously led the Storm to the IFL championship in 2011 and 2012.

== Awards and honors ==
On February 26, 2014, the IFL announced its Week 1 Players of the Week. Kicker Parker Douglass was named Special Teams Player of the Week. The league cited his perfect night offensively (1-1 on field goals, 7-7 on PATs) as well as his "high booming kickoffs" forcing Nebraska to start offensive drives from deep in their own territory. Several Sioux Falls players also received Honorable Mentions from the league: running back Tory Harrison for offense, linebacker Tyler Knight for defense, and wide receiver/kick returner James Terry for special teams play.

On March 5, 2014, the IFL announced its Week 2 Players of the Week. Sioux Falls Storm linebacker Tyler Knight was named Defensive Player of the Week. Quarterback Chris Dixon and wide receiver Judd Harrold received Honorable Mentions for offense. Kicker Parker Douglass received an Honorable Mention for special teams play. On March 12, 2014, the IFL announced its Week 3 Players of the Week. Sioux Falls Storm linebacker Tyler Knight was named as the Defensive Player of the Week for the second consecutive week. On March 19, 2014, the IFL announced its Week 4 Players of the Week. Sioux Falls Storm kicker Parker Douglass received his second Honorable Mention for special teams play.

On April 2, 2014, the IFL announced its Week 6 Players of the Week. Sioux Falls Storm running back/kick returner Tory Harrison and kicker Parker Douglass were jointly named as the Co-Special Teams Players of the Week. Quarterback Chris Dixon received his second Honorable Mention for offense. Linebacker Tyler Knight and defensive back Patrick Wells each received an Honorable Mention for defense. On April 16, 2014, the IFL announced its Week 8 Players of the Week. Sioux Falls Storm quarterback Chris Dixon was named as the Offensive Player of the Week. Honorable mentions were awarded to wide receiver Jeremiah Oates for offense, linebacker Tyler Knight for defense, and kick returner Tory Harrison for special teams play. On April 23, 2014, the IFL announced its Week 9 Players of the Week. Sioux Falls Storm defensive back Kyle Theret received an Honorable Mention for defense.

== Schedule ==
Key: Win Tie Loss Bye

=== Pre-season ===
Week	Day	Date	Kickoff	Opponent	Results		Location
Week	Day	Date	Kickoff	Opponent	Score	Record	Location
1	Friday	February 7	7:00pm	at Sioux City Bandits (CPIFL)	W 24–9	1–0	Tyson Events Center

=== Regular season ===
Week	Day	Date	Kickoff	Opponent	Results		Location	Attendance
Week	Day	Date	Kickoff	Opponent	Score	Record	Location	Attendance
1	Friday	February 21	7:05pm	Nebraska Danger	W 52–35	1–0	Sioux Falls Arena	4,875
2	Friday	February 28	7:00pm	at Colorado Ice	W 41–30	2–0	Budweiser Events Center	2,257
3	Saturday	March 8	7:05pm	at Tri-Cities Fever	W 47–40	3–0	Toyota Center	3,650
4	Sunday	March 16	4:05pm	Colorado Ice	W 50–37	4–0	Sioux Falls Arena	4,900
5	BYE							
6	Sunday	March 30	4:05pm	Green Bay Blizzard	W 86–42	5–0	Sioux Falls Arena	4,875
7	BYE							
8	Saturday	April 12	7:00pm	at Green Bay Blizzard	W 78–47	6–0	Resch Center	5,569
9	Saturday	April 19	7:05pm	Wyoming Cavalry	W 64–29	7–0	Sioux Falls Arena	4,524
10	BYE							
11	Friday	May 2	7:05pm	at Wyoming Cavalry	W 69–51	8–0	Casper Events Center	1,914
12	Saturday	May 10	7:05pm	Cedar Rapids Titans	W 48–36	9–0	Sioux Falls Arena	4,317
13	Saturday	May 17	7:05pm	Bemidji Axemen	W 34–13	10–0	Sioux Falls Arena	4,520
14	Saturday	May 24	7:00pm	at Texas Revolution	W 69–42	11–0	Allen Event Center	3,712
15	Saturday	May 31	7:05pm	at Nebraska Danger	W 45–20	12–0	Eihusen Arena	3,779
16	Saturday	June 7	7:05pm	Texas Revolution	W 34–29	13–0	Sioux Falls Arena	3,000
17	Saturday	June 14	7:05pm	at Cedar Rapids Titans	L 37–49	13–1	U.S. Cellular Center	4,126

=== Postseason ===
Week	Day	Date	Kickoff	Opponent	Results		Location	Attendance
Week	Day	Date	Kickoff	Opponent	Score	Record	Location	Attendance
United Conference Championship	Saturday	June 21	7:05pm	Cedar Rapids Titans	W 73-36	1–0	Sioux Falls Arena	NA
2014 United Bowl	Saturday	June 28	7:05pm	Nebraska Danger	W 63-46	2-0	Sioux Falls Arena	4,500

== Roster ==
2014 Sioux Falls Storm roster
Quarterbacks: 2 Chris Dixon; 1 Martevious Young; Running backs: 22 Tory Harrison; Wide receivers: 20 Judd Harrold; 88 Brandon Johnson-Farrell; 19 Jeremiah Oates; 12 Corey Surrency; 23 Mike Tatum; 9 James Terry	Offensive linemen: 74 Rashaud Mungro; 55 Charlie Sanders; 75 Myniya Smith; Defensive linemen: 16 James Dunlap; 58 Phillip Lewis; 96 Cory Johnsen; 44 Eze Obiora; 56 Akeem Ward	Linebackers: 3 Tyler Knight; Defensive backs: -- Roy Polite; 13 Jonathan Setzer; 12 Donald Smith; 24 Devion Tate; 8 Kyle Theret; 4 Patrick Wells; 19 Robert Carlisle; Kickers: 11 Parker Douglass	Injury reserve: Currently vacant; Exempt list: 24 Jermaine Robinson DL; Refused to report: 23 Michael Johnson WR; -- Marcus Gordon OL; Rookies in italics Roster updated May 29, 2014; 25 Active, 3 Inactive

== Standings ==
2014 United Conference
	W	L	T	PCT	PF	PA	GB	STK
y - Sioux Falls Storm	13	1	0	.929	754	500	0.0	L1
x - Cedar Rapids Titans	11	3	0	.786	689	597	2.0	W2
Bemidji Axemen	5	9	0	.357	592	624	8.0	L5
Texas Revolution	3	11	0	.214	532	641	10.0	L2
Green Bay Blizzard	2	12	0	.143	615	769	11.0	W1
