= 2014 Tri-Cities Fever season =

Indoor Football League team season

- Owner: Teri Carr
- General manager: Teri Carr
- Head coach: Adam Shackleford
- Home stadium: Toyota Center; 7016 West Grandridge Blvd. Kennewick, WA 99336

Results
- Record: 8–6
- Conference place: 3rd Intense

The 2014 Tri-Cities Fever season was the team's tenth season as a professional indoor football franchise and fifth in the Indoor Football League (IFL). One of nine teams competing in the IFL for the 2014 season, the Kennewick, Washington-based Tri-Cities Fever were members of the Intense Conference. Founded in 2005 as part of National Indoor Football League, the Tri-Cities Fever moved to the af2 in 2007 then jumped to the IFL before the 2010 season.

Under the leadership of owner/general manager Teri Carr and head coach Adam Shackleford, the team played their home games at the Toyota Center in Kennewick, Washington. Shackleford's staff includes assistant coach Cleveland Pratt and defensive line coach Kimo von Oelhoffen. The Fever Girls are the official dance team.

== Off-field moves ==
Fever players participated in community programs, including the "After School Matters" after-school program and "Backpack Program" food assistance program at Eastgate Elementary in the Kennewick School District.

== Awards and honors ==
On March 5, 2014, the IFL announced its Week 2 Players of the Week. Tri-Cities Fever linebacker Boris Lee was named Special Teams Player of the Week. Wide receiver Jackie Chambers received an Honorable Mention for offense. Defensive back Lionell Singleton received an Honorable Mention for defense. Kicker Brady Beeson received an Honorable Mention for special teams play. On March 12, 2014, the IFL announced its Week 3 Players of the Week. Tri-Cities Fever defensive back Lionell Singleton received a second Honorable Mention for defense.

On March 19, 2014, the IFL announced its Week 4 Players of the Week. Tri-Cities Fever defensive back Donyae Coleman received an Honorable Mention for defense and kick returner Lionell Singleton received a third Honorable Mention for special teams play. On March 26, 2014, the IFL announced its Week 5 Players of the Week. Tri-Cities Fever kicker Brady Beeson and kick returner Dennis Rogan each received an Honorable Mention for special teams play. This is Beeson's second of the season.

On April 9, 2014, the IFL announced its Week 7 Players of the Week. Tri-Cities Fever running back Keithon Flemming and wide receiver Harry Peoples received an Honorable Mention for offense. Defensive back Lionell Singleton received an Honorable Mention for defense. On April 23, 2014, the IFL announced its Week 9 Players of the Week. Tri-Cities Fever quarterback Houston Lillard was named as the Offensive Player of the Week. Defensive back Donyaé Coleman received an Honorable Mention for defense. Kicker Brady Beeson and kick returner Harry Peoples each received an Honorable Mention for special teams play.

Tri-Cities Fever 10-year commemorative patch

== Schedule ==
Key: Win Tie Loss Bye

=== Regular season ===
All start times are local time

| Week | Day | Date | Kickoff | Opponent | Results | | Location | Attendance |
| Week | Day | Date | Kickoff | Opponent | Score | Record | Location | Attendance |
|---|---|---|---|---|---|---|---|---|
| 1 | BYE | | | | | | | |
| 2 | Friday | February 28 | 7:00pm | Wyoming Cavalry | W 69–26 | 1–0 | Toyota Center | 4,407 |
| 3 | Saturday | March 8 | 7:05pm | Sioux Falls Storm | L 40–47 | 1–1 | Toyota Center | 3,650 |
| 4 | Friday | March 14 | 7:05pm | at Nebraska Danger | L 46–77 | 1–2 | Eihusen Arena | 3,650 |
| 5 | Saturday | March 22 | 7:05pm | at Cedar Rapids Titans | L 45–58 | 1–3 | U.S. Cellular Center | 4,128 |
| 6 | BYE | | | | | | | |
| 7 | Saturday | April 5 | 7:05pm | Cedar Rapids Titans | L 43–63 | 1–4 | Toyota Center | 4,067 |
| 8 | Sunday | April 13 | 3:00pm | at Colorado Ice | L 28–55 | 1–5 | Budweiser Events Center | 2,497 |
| 9 | Saturday | April 19 | 7:00pm | at Green Bay Blizzard | W 73–62 | 2–5 | Resch Center | 3,435 |
| 10 | Saturday | April 26 | 7:05pm | Colorado Ice | W 44–35 | 3–5 | Toyota Center | 3,552 |
| 11 | Saturday | May 3 | 7:05pm | Nebraska Danger | L 62–66 | 3–6 | Toyota Center | 3,482 |
| 12 | Saturday | May 10 | 7:05pm | at Bemidji Axemen | W 51–50 | 4–6 | Sanford Center | 2,149 |
| 13 | Saturday | May 17 | 7:00pm | at Texas Revolution | W 55–34 | 5–6 | Allen Event Center | 3,691 |
| 14 | Saturday | May 24 | 7:05pm | Wyoming Cavalry | W 94–30 | 6–6 | Toyota Center | 3,434 |
| 15 | BYE | | | | | | | |
| 16 | Friday | June 6 | 7:05pm | at Wyoming Cavalry | W 64–35 | 7–6 | Casper Events Center | 1,550 |
| 17 | Saturday | June 14 | 7:05pm | Colorado Ice | W 47–33 | 8–6 | Toyota Center | 2,700 |

== Roster ==
2014 Tri-Cities Fever roster
| Quarterbacks: 10 Houston Lillard; 5 Dante Warren; Running backs: 24 Keithon Flemming; Wide receivers: 3 Ed Berry; 4 Jackie Chambers; 17 Dejuan Miller; 8 Harry Peoples; -- Mario Washington; 7 Steven Whitehead | Offensive linemen: 56 Andrew Faaumu; 60 Joel McCleod; 52 Lloyd Morrison Jr.; 79 Mike Trice; Defensive linemen: 99 Pablo Garcia; 90 Sean McDonald; 40 Brandon Rankin | Linebackers: 44 Boris Lee; 27 Brandon Wilson; Defensive backs: 6 Donyaé Coleman; 21 Rudell Crim; 1 Dennis Rogan; 2 Lionell Singleton; 18 Ashante Williams; Kickers: 13 Brady Beeson | Injured Reserve: 12 Dustin Bell DB; 11 Oliver Young WR; Exempt List: currently vacant; rookies in italics Roster updated June 3, 2014; 24 Active, 2 Inactive → More rosters |

== Standings ==
2014 Intense Conference
| | W | L | T | PCT | PF | PA | GB | STK |
|---|---|---|---|---|---|---|---|---|
| y - Colorado Ice | 10 | 4 | 0 | .714 | 708 | 503 | 0.0 | L1 |
| x - Nebraska Danger | 10 | 4 | 0 | .714 | 684 | 540 | 0.0 | W1 |
| Tri-Cities Fever | 8 | 6 | 0 | .571 | 761 | 671 | 2.0 | W5 |
| Wyoming Cavalry | 1 | 13 | 0 | .071 | 441 | 931 | 9.0 | L10 |
