= 2014 Green Bay Blizzard season =

Indoor Football League team season

- Owner: Larry and Kathy Treankler
- Head coach: Chad Baldwin (games (1–6); Tommie Williams (games 1–7)
- Home stadium: Resch Center; 1901 South Oneida Street; Green Bay, Wisconsin 54304

Results
- Record: 2-12
- Conference place: 5th United

The 2014 Green Bay Blizzard season was the team's twelfth season as a professional indoor football franchise and fifth in the Indoor Football League (IFL). One of nine teams competing in the IFL for the 2014 season, the Green Bay Blizzard were members of the United Conference. The team played their home games at the Resch Center in the Green Bay suburb of Ashwaubenon, Wisconsin.

The Blizzard began the 2014 season under head coach Chad Baldwin. After the team began the season 0–6, Baldwin was replaced by offensive coordinator Tommie Williams for the remainder of the season.

== History ==
The Blizzard struggled during the 2013 season, replacing head coach Robert Fuller after six games with Chad Baldwin and ending the regular season with a 4–10 record. The team did not qualify for the playoffs but drew an average attendance of 3,812 for their seven regular season games.

After failing to turn reach certain unspecified "financial benchmarks", three of the four principal owners of the team agreed to place the Green Bay franchise for sale in late June 2013. If a new owner was not found by September 1, 2013, the franchise planned to suspend operations for the 2014 IFL season. On September 19, local business people Larry and Kathy Treankler were announced as the new principal owners of the Blizzard with former Green Bay Packers star Ahman Green remaining as a co-owner.

== Off-field moves ==
The team has scheduled a series of promotional events for the 2014 season. These include St. Patrick's Day Hat on March 16, Youth Jersey Night on April 12, Bart Starr Bobblehead Night on May 3, Military Appreciation and Youth Hat Night on May 17, and Receiver Glove Night on May 31.

In mid-April, the team fired head coach Chad Baldwin after the Blizzard lost their first six games of the 2014 season. Baldwin amassed a 3–11 record at Green Bay after taking over from Robert Fuller under similar circumstances the previous season. The team promoted offensive coordinator Tommie Williams to head coach as Baldwin's replacement.

== Roster moves ==
In late January 2014, the Blizzard announced the re-signing of offensive linemen William Maxwell and Tyler Hendrickson plus linebacker Derek Earls for the 2014 season.

== Awards and honors ==
On February 26, 2014, the IFL announced its Week 1 Players of the Week. Honorable Mentions were made for quarterback Taylor Perkins for offense and wide receiver/kick returner Donte Sawyer for special teams play.

On March 12, 2014, the IFL announced its Week 3 Players of the Week. Green Bay Blizzard running back Lucien Walker received an Honorable Mention for offense. On March 19, 2014, the IFL announced its Week 4 Players of the Week. Green Bay Blizzard defensive back James Ackel received an Honorable Mention for defense. On March 26, 2014, the IFL announced its Week 5 Players of the Week. Green Bay Blizzard linebacker Derek Earls received an Honorable Mention for defense.

On April 2, 2014, the IFL announced its Week 6 Players of the Week. Green Bay Blizzard wide receiver Andre London and quarterback Nate Wara each received an Honorable Mention for offense. Wide receiver/kick returner Daron Clark received an Honorable Mention for special teams play. On April 16, 2014, the IFL announced its Week 8 Players of the Week. Green Bay Blizzard running back Lucien Walker received his second Honorable Mention for offense. On April 23, 2014, the IFL announced its Week 9 Players of the Week. Green Bay Blizzard quarterback Nate Wara received an Honorable Mention for offense.

== Schedule ==
Key: Win Tie Loss Bye

=== Regular season ===
Week	Day	Date	Kickoff	Opponent	Results		Location	Attendance
Week	Day	Date	Kickoff	Opponent	Score	Record	Location	Attendance
1	Saturday	February 22	7:00pm	at Bemidji Axemen	L 36–40	0–1	Sanford Center	3,296
2	BYE							
3	Saturday	March 8	7:05pm	at Cedar Rapids Titans	L 13–35	0–2	U.S. Cellular Center	5,514
4	Sunday	March 16	3:00pm	Cedar Rapids Titans	L 39–58	0–3	Resch Center	4,010
5	Sunday	March 23	7:00pm	at Texas Revolution	L 40–57	0–4	Allen Event Center	3,418
6	Sunday	March 30	4:05pm	at Sioux Falls Storm	L 42–86	0–5	Sioux Falls Arena	4,875
7	BYE							
8	Saturday	April 12	7:00pm	Sioux Falls Storm	L 47–78	0–6	Resch Center	5,569
9	Saturday	April 19	7:00pm	Tri-Cities Fever	L 62–73	0–7	Resch Center	3,435
10	Friday	April 25♥	7:05pm	at Bemidji Axemen	L 36–42	0–8	Sanford Center	3,276
11	Saturday	May 3	7:00pm	Bemidji Axemen	L 61–66	0–9	Resch Center	3,884
12	BYE							
13	Saturday	May 17	7:00pm	Nebraska Danger	L 44–56	0–10	Resch Center	3,589
14	Friday	May 23	7:05pm	at Cedar Rapids Titans	L 37–47	0–11	U.S. Cellular Center	3,592
15	Saturday	May 31	7:00pm	Cedar Rapids Titans	W 59-40	1–11	Resch Center	2,728
16	Saturday	June 7	6:00pm	at Colorado Ice	L 47–49	1–12	Budweiser Events Center	2,100
17	Friday	June 13	7:30pm	Bemidji Axemen	W 52–35	2–12	Resch Center	2,326

♥ Rescheduled from April 26 due to arena scheduling conflicts

== Roster ==
2014 Green Bay Blizzard roster
Quarterback: 4 Robbie Nallenweg; 12 Nate Wara; Running back: 34 Lucien Walker; Wide receiver: 8 Avonte Jones; 6 Andre London; 1 Donte Sawyer; 15 Marquel Willis	Offensive linemen: 77 William Maxwell; 69 Aneus Ruiz; 70 Dylan Waupoose; 55 Larry Westphal; Defensive linemen: 97 Leon Mackey; 94 Paul Melicharek; 92 Kyle Patterson; 66 Edward Smith	Linebacker: 50 Jamil Moore; Defensive back: 24 James Ackel; 9 Orkeys Auriene; 18 Nicolas Bonte; 21 Dontrell Johnson; 5 Alex McCray; 13 Demetrius Stone; Kicker: 19 Adrian Trevino	Injured Reserve: 99 Junior Aumavae DL; 79 Adrian Battles OL; 69 Kris Cavitt OL; 10 Allen Daniels WR; 42 Derek Earls LB; 21 George Ortiz DB; 4 Markeith Summers WR; 2 Mark Watley DB; Exempt List: 11 Shawn Plummer DB; Refused to Report: -- Jeremy Jester LB; rookies in italics Roster updated June 4, 2014; 23 Active, 10 Inactive → More rosters

== Standings ==
2014 United Conference
	W	L	T	PCT	PF	PA	GB	STK
y - Sioux Falls Storm	13	1	0	.929	754	500	0.0	L1
x - Cedar Rapids Titans	11	3	0	.786	689	597	2.0	W2
Bemidji Axemen	5	9	0	.357	592	624	8.0	L5
Texas Revolution	3	11	0	.214	532	641	10.0	L2
Green Bay Blizzard	2	12	0	.143	615	769	11.0	W1
