= 2014 Bemidji Axemen season =

Indoor Football League team season

- Owner: Chris Kokalis & Ross Ladehoff
- General manager: Chris Kokalis
- Head coach: Robert Fuller
- Home stadium: Sanford Center; 1111 Event Center Drive; Bemidji, Minnesota 56601

Results
- Record: 5–9
- Conference place: 3rd United

The 2014 Bemidji Axemen season was the team's first season as a professional indoor football franchise and first in the Indoor Football League (IFL). One of nine teams competing in the IFL for the 2014 season, the Bemidji, Minnesota-based Axemen were members of the United Conference.

Founded in August 2013 as an expansion team, the Bemidji Axemen began play in February 2014 with the start of the 2014 IFL season. Under the leadership of co-owners Chris Kokalis and Ross Ladehoff plus head coach Robert Fuller, the team plays their home games at the Sanford Center in Bemidji, Minnesota.

== Off-field moves ==
On October 14, 2013, the Axemen announced Robert Fuller as the team's first head coach. Fuller has eight years of indoor football experience, including the last two seasons as head coach of the Green Bay Blizzard. He was honored as the Indoor Football League Coach of the Year in both 2011 and 2012.

Bemidji acquired their field turf from a defunct IFL team in Ohio and refurbished and repainted the surface before their first home exhibition game. On January 20, 2014, the team announced that naming rights for the field were sold to the Leech Lake Band of Ojibwe for their Palace Casino and Hotel. As such, the team plays its home games on "Palace Casino Field inside the Sanford Center".

The team is working with medical and athletic training services provider Sanford Bemidji to monitor the condition of players for potential treatment of concussions and brain injuries.

== Roster moves ==
On September 20, 2013, the Axemen announced the signing of their first player, kicker Scott Enos. He played college football with the University of Hawaii and his professional experience includes a stint with the Cedar Rapids Titans.

The team held public tryouts on November 23–24, 2013, at the West Saint Paul Regional Athletics Center in St. Paul, Minnesota. On December 3, the team announced the signing of offensive lineman Chuck Palonis, linebacker Jory Johnson, wide receiver Maurice Patterson, and defensive lineman Maurice Hamption.

On December 14, Bemidji signed defender DeQuan Starling, wide receiver Darnell Williams, and quarterback Joshua Aakre. The team also announced that they had acquired wide receiver Ryan Balentine in a trade for future considerations with the Green Bay Blizzard.

== Awards and honors ==
On February 26, 2014, the IFL announced its Week 1 Players of the Week. Bemidji Axemen defensive back DeQuan Starling received an Honorable Mention for defense. On March 5, 2014, the IFL announced its Week 2 Players of the Week. Bemidji Axemen defensive back and kick returner De'Markus Washington each received an Honorable Mention for special teams play.

On March 19, 2014, the IFL announced its Week 4 Players of the Week. Bemidji Axemen quarterback Hunter Wanket was named as the Offensive Player of the Week. Wide receiver Ryan Balentine received an Honorable Mention for offense, linebacker Jory Johnson received an Honorable Mention for defense, and kick returner De’Markus Washington received a second Honorable Mention for special teams play. On March 26, 2014, the IFL announced its Week 5 Players of the Week. Bemidji Axemen wide receiver Nick Truesdell received an Honorable Mention for offense. Linebacker Jory Johnson received a second Honorable Mention for defense.

On April 2, 2014, the IFL announced its Week 6 Players of the Week. Bemidji Axemen linebacker Jory Johnson received his third Honorable Mention this season for defense. Kicker Zach Pulkinen received an Honorable Mention for special teams play. On April 16, 2014, the IFL announced its Week 8 Players of the Week. Bemidji Axemen defensive back De’Markus Washington received his third Honorable Mention of the season, but first for defense rather than special teams play. On April 23, 2014, the IFL announced its Week 9 Players of the Week. Bemidji Axemen wide receiver Ryan Balentine received an Honorable Mention for offense. Defensive lineman Montez Robinson received an Honorable Mention for defense. Kicker Zach Pulkinen received an Honorable Mention for special teams play.

== Schedule ==
Key: Win Tie Loss Bye

=== Pre-season ===
Week	Day	Date	Kickoff	Opponent	Results		Location
Week	Day	Date	Kickoff	Opponent	Score	Record	Location
1	Friday	February 7	7:05pm	Cedar Rapids Titans	L 30–42	0–1	Sanford Center
2	Saturday	February 15	7:05pm	at Cedar Rapids Titans	L 11–22	0–2	U.S. Cellular Center

=== Regular season ===
All start times are local time

Week	Day	Date	Kickoff	Opponent	Results		Location	Attendance
Week	Day	Date	Kickoff	Opponent	Score	Record	Location	Attendance
1	Saturday	February 22	7:00pm	Green Bay Blizzard	W 40–36	1–0	Sanford Center	3,296
2	Saturday	March 1	7:00pm	at Nebraska Danger	L 43–19	1–1	Eihusen Arena	5,275
3	BYE							
4	Saturday	March 15	7:05pm	Wyoming Cavalry	W 92–49	2–1	Sanford Center	3,675
5	Friday	March 21	7:05pm	Nebraska Danger	L 38–48	2–2	Sanford Center	3,746
6	Saturday	March 29	7:05pm	at Cedar Rapids Titans	L 37–48	2–3	U.S. Cellular Center	4,283
7	BYE							
8	Friday	April 11	7:05pm	at Wyoming Cavalry	W 33–14	3–3	Casper Events Center	2,617
9	Saturday	April 19	7:05pm	at Cedar Rapids Titans	L 57–60	3–4	U.S. Cellular Center	4,465
10	Friday	April 25♥	7:05pm	Green Bay Blizzard	W 42–36	4–4	Sanford Center	3,276
11	Saturday	May 3	7:00pm	at Green Bay Blizzard	W 66–61	5–4	Resch Center	3,884
12	Saturday	May 10	7:05pm	Tri-Cities Fever	L 50–51	5–5	Sanford Center	2,149
13	Saturday	May 17	7:05pm	at Sioux Falls Storm	L 13–34	5–6	Sioux Falls Arena	4,520
14	BYE							
15	Saturday	May 31	7:05pm	Texas Revolution	L 27–43	5–7	Sanford Center	2,539
16	Saturday	June 7	7:05pm	Cedar Rapids Titans	L 43–49	5–8	Sanford Center	1,971
17	Friday	June 13	7:30pm	at Green Bay Blizzard	L 32–52	5–9	Resch Center	2,326

♥ Rescheduled from April 26 due to arena scheduling conflicts

== Roster ==
2014 Bemidji Axemen roster
Quarterbacks: 14 Joshua Aakre; 18 Cody Kirby; Running backs: 6 Warren Matthews Jr.; 7 DeMario Pippen; Wide receivers: 4 Ryan Balentine; 3 Philander Browder; -- Sheldon Galloway; 5 Josh Jarboe; 15 David Lewis	Offensive linemen: 66 Terrence Clark; 70 Kadre Pinder; 72 Chuck Palonis; Defensive linemen: 94 Jordan Morgan; 97 Rony Nelson; 99 Torlan Pittman; 98 Caesar Rodriguez	Linebackers: 28 Jory Johnson; 15 Derek Rose; Defensive backs: 2 Lamar Allen; -- Byron Best; 12 Brandon Clarke; 21 A. J. Downs; 8 Mike McMillan; 13 Gary Wilburn; Kickers: 34 Zach Pulkinen	Injured Reserve: 92 Nate Douglas DL; 5 Hunter Wanket QB; Transfer List: 36 Jajuan Harley DB; Refused to Report: 90 Maurice Hampton DL; 88 Darnell Williams WR; rookies in italics Roster updated June 5, 2014; 25 Active, 5 Inactive → More rosters

== Standings ==
2014 United Conference
	W	L	T	PCT	PF	PA	GB	STK
y - Sioux Falls Storm	13	1	0	.929	754	500	0.0	L1
x - Cedar Rapids Titans	11	3	0	.786	689	597	2.0	W2
Bemidji Axemen	5	9	0	.357	592	624	8.0	L5
Texas Revolution	3	11	0	.214	532	641	10.0	L2
Green Bay Blizzard	2	12	0	.143	615	769	11.0	W1
