= 2014 Colorado Ice season =

Indoor Football League team season

- Owner: Tom Wigley
- General manager: Collins Sanders
- Head coach: Heron O'Neal
- Home stadium: Budweiser Events Center; 5290 Arena Circle; Loveland, Colorado 80538

Results
- Record: 10–4
- Conference place: 1st Intense
- Playoffs: Lost Intense Conference Championship 15-45 (Danger)
- Team MVP: Willie Copeland

The 2014 Colorado Ice season was the team's eighth season as a professional indoor football franchise and sixth in the Indoor Football League (IFL). One of nine teams that competed in the IFL for the 2014 season, the Fort Collins-based Colorado Ice were members of the Intense Conference.

Founded in 2007 as part of United Indoor Football, the Colorado Ice became charter members of the IFL when the UIF merged with the Intense Football League before the 2009 season. In their third season under head coach Heron O'Neal, the team played their home games at the Budweiser Events Center in Loveland, Colorado.

The Colorado Icicles dance team is led by director Rehannon Crumb.

== Roster moves ==
The team invited 40 players to training camp starting February 5. After workouts and a pre-season exhibition game, the roster was trimmed to the 24 players permitted under IFL rules.

== Awards and honors ==
On March 5, 2014, the IFL announced its Week 2 Players of the Week. Colorado Ice wide receiver Jasonus Tillery received an Honorable Mention for offense. Linebacker Joe Thornton received an Honorable Mention for defense. On March 12, 2014, the IFL announced its Week 3 Players of the Week. Colorado Ice kicker Philip Welch was named as the Special Teams Player of the Week. Wide receiver Kyle Kaiser received an Honorable Mention for offense. Defensive lineman Harcourt Farquharson and linebacker Joe Thornton each received an Honorable Mention for defense.

On April 2, 2014, the IFL announced its Week 6 Players of the Week. Colorado Ice running back Dennis Kennedy was named as the Offensive Player of the Week. On April 9, 2014, the IFL announced its Week 7 Players of the Week. Colorado Ice quarterback Willie Copeland was named as the Offensive Player of the Week. Defensive back Harcourt Farquharson and defensive lineman Jason Jones each received an Honorable Mention for defense. Linebacker Joe Thornton received his third Honorable Mention of the season, his first for special teams play.

On April 16, 2014, the IFL announced its Week 8 Players of the Week. Colorado Ice defensive back Corey Sample was named as the Defensive Player of the Week. Kick returner Harcourt Farquharson and kicker Philip Welch each received an Honorable Mention for special teams play. On April 23, 2014, the IFL announced its Week 9 Players of the Week. Colorado Ice defensive lineman Jason Jones was named as the Defensive Player of the Week. Quarterback Willie Copeland received an Honorable Mention for offense. Linebacker Joe Thornton received an Honorable Mention for defense.

== Schedule ==
Key: Win Tie Loss Bye

=== Preseason ===
Week	Day	Date	Kickoff	Opponent	Results		Location
Week	Day	Date	Kickoff	Opponent	Score	Record	Location
1	Saturday	February 15	6:00pm	Pueblo Steel (CFC)	W 100–7	1–0	Budweiser Events Center

=== Regular season ===
All start times are Mountain Time

Week	Day	Date	Kickoff	Opponent	Results		Location	Attendance
Week	Day	Date	Kickoff	Opponent	Score	Record	Location	Attendance
1	BYE							
2	Friday	February 28	7:00pm	Sioux Falls Storm	L 30–41	0–1	Budweiser Events Center	2,257
3	Saturday	March 8	12:00pm	Wyoming Cavalry	W 73–22	1–1	Budweiser Events Center	1,872
4	Sunday	March 16	3:05pm	at Sioux Falls Storm	L 37–50	1–2	Sioux Falls Arena	4,900
5	BYE							
6	Sunday	March 30	3:00pm	Nebraska Danger	W 38–30	2–2	Budweiser Events Center	2,423
7	Friday	April 4	7:05pm	at Wyoming Cavalry	W 51–50	3–2	Casper Events Center	2,437
8	Sunday	April 13	3:00pm	Tri-Cities Fever	W 55–28	4–2	Budweiser Events Center	2,497
9	Saturday	April 19	6:05pm	at Texas Revolution	W 69–42	5–2	Allen Event Center	3,388
10	Saturday	April 26	8:05pm	at Tri-Cities Fever	L 35–44	5–3	Toyota Center	3,552
11	BYE							
12	Saturday	May 10	6:00pm	Texas Revolution	W 55–34	6–3	Budweiser Events Center	2,276
13	Saturday	May 17	6:00pm	Wyoming Cavalry	W 73–12	7–3	Budweiser Events Center	2,140
14	Thursday	May 22	6:05pm	at Nebraska Danger	W 41–28	8–3	Eihusen Arena	3,787
15	Friday	May 30	7:05pm	at Wyoming Cavalry	W 69–28	9–3	Casper Events Center	1,745
16	Saturday	June 7	6:00pm	Green Bay Blizzard	W 49–47	10–3	Budweiser Events Center	2,100
17	Saturday	June 14	8:05pm	at Tri-Cities Fever	L 33–47	10–4	Toyota Center	2,700

=== Postseason ===
Week	Day	Date	Kickoff	Opponent	Results		Location	Attendance
Week	Day	Date	Kickoff	Opponent	Score	Record	Location	Attendance
Intense Conference Championship	Thursday	June 19	7:00pm	Nebraska Danger	L 15-45	0–1	Budweiser Events Center	1,000

== Roster ==
2014 Colorado Ice roster
Quarterbacks: 13 Willie Copeland; 10 Jake Johnson; Running backs: 33 Randy Bell; Wide receivers: 3 James Davis Jr.; 9 Donald Fusilier; 4 Justin Helwege; 8 Kyle Kaiser; 88 Jasonus Tillery	Offensive linemen: 75 Sanford Banks; 74 Lemone Buford; 78 Rodrick Gladney; -- Keyun Swinney; Defensive linemen: 95 Chancey Aghayere; 90 D. D. Jones; 54 Jason Jones	Linebackers: 98 Markell Carter; 21 Danny Mason; 1 Joe Thornton; Defensive backs: 19 Michael Eby; 5 Court Farquharson; 2 Deante Purvis; 20 Corey Sample; 24 Malcolm Williams; Kickers: 22 Philip Welch	Injured reserve: -- Jason Cohen; Exempt list: -- A. J. Guyton WR; 92 Mario Henderson OL; Refused to report: -- Stanley Arukwe WR; Rookies in italics Roster updated May 28, 2014; 24 Active, 4 Inactive → More rosters

== Standings ==
2014 Intense Conference
	W	L	T	PCT	PF	PA	GB	STK
y - Colorado Ice	10	4	0	.714	708	503	0.0	L1
x - Nebraska Danger	10	4	0	.714	684	540	0.0	W1
Tri-Cities Fever	8	6	0	.571	761	671	2.0	W5
Wyoming Cavalry	1	13	0	.071	441	931	9.0	L10
