= 2014 Cedar Rapids Titans season =

Indoor Football League team season

- Owner: Chris Kokalis; Bob Sullivan; David Bradley; Kenneth Moninski
- General manager: Chris Kokalis
- Head coach: Mark Stoute
- Home stadium: U.S. Cellular Center; 370 1st Avenue NE; Cedar Rapids, Iowa 52401

Results
- Record: 11-3
- Conference place: 2nd United
- Playoffs: Lost United Conference Championship 36-73 (Storm)

The 2014 Cedar Rapids Titans season was the third season of the Cedar Rapids Titans as a professional indoor football franchise in the Indoor Football League (IFL). One of nine teams competing in the IFL for the 2014 season, the Cedar Rapids Titans were members of the league's United Conference.

The Titans played their home games at the U.S. Cellular Center in downtown Cedar Rapids, Iowa. The team is led by head coach Mark Stoute, the 2013 Indoor Football League Coach of the Year. The Titans Dolls dance squad is led by dance team director Lindsay Wray.

== Off-field moves ==
After playing its first two seasons in the 4,000 seat Cedar Rapids Ice Arena, the team made a twice-delayed move to the newly renovated 6,900-seat U.S. Cellular Center in downtown Cedar Rapids for its home games. The team also changed practice facilities for the 2014 season, moving from SportZone in Hiawatha to the Game Winning Entertainment Sports Center in northeast Cedar Rapids.

== Roster moves ==
The coaching staff for 2014 includes head coach Mark Stoute (the 2013 Indoor Football League Coach of the Year) and initially included assistant coaches Sean Ponder, Michael Custer, Derrick Reaves, and Ed Flanagan. By April 2014, coaches Ponder, Reaves, and Flanagan had left the team while Terry Bates signed on as defensive backs coach and Ameer Ismail joined as defensive coordinator.

== Awards and honors ==
On February 26, 2014, the IFL announced its Week 1 Players of the Week. Honorable Mentions were made for wide receiver Carl Sims for offense and kicker Rockne Belmonte for special teams play. On March 12, 2014, the IFL announced its Week 3 Players of the Week. Cedar Rapids Titans running back LaRon Council was named as the Offensive Player of the Week. Defensive lineman Xzavie Jackson received an Honorable Mention for defense. Kicker Rockne Belmonte and kick returner Robert Brown each received an Honorable Mention for special teams play.

On March 19, 2014, the IFL announced its Week 4 Players of the Week. Cedar Rapids Titans running back LaRon Council received an Honorable Mention for offense. Kicker Rockne Belmonte received a third Honorable Mention for special teams play. On March 26, 2014, the IFL announced its Week 5 Players of the Week. Cedar Rapids Titans linebacker Pasquale Vacchio was named as the Defensive Player of the Week. Kicker Rockne Belmonte was named as the Special Teams Player of the Week. Wide receiver Bryan Pray received an Honorable Mention for offense. On April 2, 2014, the IFL announced its Week 6 Players of the Week. Cedar Rapids Titans kicker Rockne Belmonte received his fourth Honorable Mention this season for special teams play.

On April 9, 2014, the IFL announced its Week 7 Players of the Week. Cedar Rapids Titans defensive lineman Kyle Jenkins was named as the Defensive Player of the Week. Quarterback Spencer Ohm received an Honorable Mention for offense. Defensive back Ricky Johnson received an Honorable Mention for defense. Kicker Rockne Belmonte received his fifth Honorable Mention for special teams play. On April 23, 2014, the IFL announced its Week 9 Players of the Week. Cedar Rapids Titans kicker Rockne Belmonte was named as the Special Teams Player of the Week for the second time this season. Kick returner Robert Brown received an Honorable Mention for special teams play.

== Schedule ==
Key: Win Tie Loss Bye

=== Pre-season ===
Week	Day	Date	Kickoff	Opponent	Results		Location	Attendance
Week	Day	Date	Kickoff	Opponent	Score	Record	Location	Attendance
1	Friday	February 7	7:05pm	at Bemidji Axemen	W 42–30	1–0	Sanford Center	NA
2	Saturday	February 15	7:05pm	Bemidji Axemen	W 22–11	2–0	U.S. Cellular Center	NA

=== Regular season ===
Week	Day	Date	Kickoff	Opponent	Results		Location	Attendance
Week	Day	Date	Kickoff	Opponent	Score	Record	Location	Attendance
1	Friday	February 21	7:05pm	at Texas Revolution	L 38–47	0–1	Allen Event Center	2,722
2	BYE							
3	Saturday	March 8	7:05pm	Green Bay Blizzard	W 35–13	1–1	U.S. Cellular Center	5,514
4	Sunday	March 16	3:00pm	at Green Bay Blizzard	W 58–39	2–1	Resch Center	4,010
5	Saturday	March 22	7:05pm	Tri-Cities Fever	W 58–45	3–1	U.S. Cellular Center	4,128
6	Saturday	March 29	7:05pm	Bemidji Axemen	W 48–37	4–1	U.S. Cellular Center	4,283
7	Saturday	April 5	9:05pm	at Tri-Cities Fever	W 63–43	5–1	Toyota Center	4,067
8	BYE							
9	Saturday	April 19	7:05pm	Bemidji Axemen	W 60–57	6–1	U.S. Cellular Center	4,465
10	Friday	April 25	7:00pm	at Texas Revolution	W 59–57	7–1	Allen Event Center	3,511
11	Saturday	May 3	7:05pm	Texas Revolution	W 49–35	8–1	U.S. Cellular Center	3,876
12	Saturday	May 10	7:05pm	at Sioux Falls Storm	L 36–48	8–2	Sioux Falls Arena	4,317
13	BYE							
14	Friday	May 23	7:05pm	Green Bay Blizzard	W 47–37	9–2	U.S. Cellular Center	3,592
15	Saturday	May 31	7:00pm	at Green Bay Blizzard	L 40–59	9–3	Resch Center	2,728
16	Saturday	June 7	7:05pm	at Bemidji Axemen	W 49–43	10–3	Sanford Center	1,971
17	Saturday	June 14	7:05pm	Sioux Falls Storm	W 49–37	11–3	U.S. Cellular Center	4,126

=== Postseason ===
Week	Day	Date	Kickoff	Opponent	Results		Location	Attendance
Week	Day	Date	Kickoff	Opponent	Score	Record	Location	Attendance
United Conference Championship	Saturday	June 21	7:05pm	at Sioux Falls Storm	L 36-73	0-1	Sioux Falls Arena	NA

== Roster ==
2014 Cedar Rapids Titans roster
Quarterbacks: 3 Spencer Ohm; 5 Dante Perez; Running backs: 6 LaRon Council; 28 Martin Ward; Wide receivers: 10 Willie Carter; 8 J. J. Hayes; 9 Bryan Pray; 4 Carl Sims	Offensive linemen: 75 Albert Erni Jr.; 56 Taylor Pass; -- Maurice Robinson; 98 Fredrick Ruff; Defensive linemen: 93 Xzavie Jackson; 99 Kyle Jenkins; 92 Jeremiah Price; 90 Richard Posey; 47 Christopher Skiba	Linebackers: 44 Nick Haag; 17 Pasquale Vacchio; Defensive backs: 16 Robert Brown; 2 Jereme Green; 1 Ricky Johnson; 7 Travonti Johnson; -- Timothy Shelley; Kickers: 12 Rockne Belmonte	Injured Reserve: 19 Courtney Daniels LB; 11 Aaron Moore DB; Refused to Report: 78 Jordan Mosely OL; 91 Ben Pister DL; Exempt List: currently vacant; Roster updated June 5, 2014; 24 Active, 4 Inactive → More rosters

== Standings ==
2014 United Conference
	W	L	T	PCT	PF	PA	GB	STK
y - Sioux Falls Storm	13	1	0	.929	754	500	0.0	L1
x - Cedar Rapids Titans	11	3	0	.786	689	597	2.0	W2
Bemidji Axemen	5	9	0	.357	592	624	8.0	L5
Texas Revolution	3	11	0	.214	532	641	10.0	L2
Green Bay Blizzard	2	12	0	.143	615	769	11.0	W1
