= Bryson Kelly =

American football defensive lineman

No. 36, 91, 95
- Position: Defensive lineman

Personal information
- Born: July 1, 1989 (age 37); San Diego, California, U.S.
- Listed height: 6 ft 2 in (1.88 m)
- Listed weight: 269 lb (122 kg)

Career information
- High school: Kamiak (Mukilteo, Washington)
- College: Central Washington
- NFL draft: 2011: undrafted

Career history
- Oakland Raiders (2011)*; Wyoming Cavalry (2013–2014); Spokane Shock (2014–2015); Portland Steel (2016); Calgary Stampeders (2016–2017); Washington Valor (2017); Jacksonville Sharks (2017); Iowa Barnstormers (2018)*
- * Offseason or practice squad member only

Awards and highlights
- NAL champion (2017); First-team All-GNAC (2010); Second-team All-GNAC (2009)

Career AFL statistics
- Rush attempts: 48
- Rushing yards: 117
- Rushing touchdowns: 12
- Tackles: 35
- Sacks: 4.5
- Stats at ArenaFan.com
- Stats at CFL.ca

Bryson Kelly (born July 1, 1989) is an American former professional football defensive lineman and fullback. He played college football at Central Washington University. He was a member of the Oakland Raiders, Wyoming Cavalry, Spokane Shock, Portland Steel, Calgary Stampeders, Washington Valor, Jacksonville Sharks, and Iowa Barnstormers.

== Early life ==
Kelly attended Kamiak High School in Mukilteo, Washington.

== College career ==
Kelly played for the Santa Ana Dons from 2007 to 2008 and helped the Dons to 11 wins.

College recruiting
Name	Hometown	School	Height	Weight	Commit date
Bryson Kelly; RB	Mukilteo, Washington	Santa Ana College	6 ft 1 in (1.85 m)	218 lb (99 kg)	
Bryson Kelly; RB	Recruit ratings: Scout: Rivals: 247Sports: ESPN:				
Overall recruit ranking: Scout: 13 (RB)
Note: In many cases, Scout, Rivals, 247Sports, On3, and ESPN may conflict in their listings of height and weight.; In these cases, the average was taken. ESPN grades are on a 100-point scale.; Sources: "2009 Team Ranking". Rivals.com.

Kelly played for the Central Washington Wildcats from 2009 to 2010. Kelly was named Second Team All-Great Northwest Athletic Conference as a junior in 2009. Kelly was named First Team All-Great Northwest Athletic Conference as a senior in 2010.

== Professional career ==
Pre-draft measurables
Height	Weight	40-yard dash	10-yard split	20-yard split	20-yard shuttle	Three-cone drill	Vertical jump	Broad jump	Bench press
6 ft 1 in (1.85 m)	252 lb (114 kg)	4.62 s	1.66 s	2.81 s	4.18 s	7.19 s	38.5 in (0.98 m)	10 ft 11 in (3.33 m)	26 reps
All values Central Washington Pro Day

Kelly signed with the Oakland Raiders as an undrafted free agent in 2011. Kelly was waived after the preseason. Kelly was invited to rookie minicamp with the Seattle Seahawks in 2012, but did not sign with the team. Kelly attended rookie minicamp with the Carolina Panthers in 2013, but did not sign with the team.

Kelly signed with the Wyoming Cavalry of the Indoor Football League in 2013 and stayed with the team through 2014.

On April 7, 2014, Kelly was assigned to the Spokane Shock. On September 24, 2017, Kelly had his rookie option exercised. Kelly took over as the Shock's starting fullback.

Kelly was assigned to the Portland Steel on November 18, 2015.

Kelly signed with the Calgary Stampeders of the Canadian Football League.

On May 16, 2017, Kelly was assigned to the Washington Valor. On May 17, 2017, Kelly was placed on reassignment.

On June 12, 2017, Kelly signed with the Jacksonville Sharks.
