= Samuel Charles =

American football player (born 1985)

No. 4 – Iowa Barnstormers
- Position: Wide receiver
- Roster status: Active

Personal information
- Born: December 2, 1985 (age 40); Miami, Florida
- Listed height: 6 ft 3 in (1.91 m)
- Listed weight: 210 lb (95 kg)

Career information
- High school: Hialeah-Miami Lakes (FL)
- College: Edward Waters
- NFL draft: 2012: undrafted

Career history
- Wyoming Cavalry (2014); Spokane Shock (2014–2015); Spokane Empire (2016–2017); Jacksonville Sharks (2018); Iowa Barnstormers (2019–present)

Awards and highlights
- 2nd Team All-NAIA Independent (2009); 2nd Team All-IFL (2014)

Career AFL statistics
- Receptions: 20
- Receiving yards: 221
- Receiving TDs: 3
- Tackles: 5
- Stats at ArenaFan.com

Samuel Charles (born December 2, 1985) is an American football wide receiver for the Iowa Barnstormers of the Indoor Football League (IFL). He played college football at Edward Waters College.

== College career ==
Charles continued his football career at Edward Waters College. As a sophomore in 2009, Charles was named 2nd Team All-NAIA Independent.

== Professional career ==
=== Wyoming Cavalry ===
In 2014, Charles signed with the Wyoming Cavalry of the Indoor Football League (IFL). After an impressive rookie season, Charles was named 2nd Team All-IFL.

=== Spokane Shock ===
Charles was assigned to the Spokane Shock of the Arena Football League (AFL) for the remainder of the 2014 season. The Shock picked up Charles' rookie option for 2015. In the Shock's first game of the season, Charles caught his first two passes of his AFL career for 14 yards. He was placed on reassignment on May 18, 2015, and after clearing waivers, was assigned the Shock on May 20, 2015. On August 23, 2016, Charles re-signed with the Spokane Empire.

=== Jacksonville Sharks ===
Charles signed with the Jacksonville Sharks of the National Arena League (NAL) for the 2018 season.
