= Jamar Love =

American football player (born 1986)

No. 5, 9
- Position: Cornerback

Personal information
- Born: November 8, 1986 (age 39); North Little Rock, Arkansas, U.S.
- Listed height: 6 ft 0 in (1.83 m)
- Listed weight: 190 lb (86 kg)

Career information
- High school: North Little Rock
- College: Arkansas
- NFL draft: 2009: undrafted

Career history
- New England Patriots (2009)*; Dallas Cowboys (2009)*; Tampa Bay Buccaneers (2009)*; Tennessee Titans (2009); Saskatchewan Roughriders (2011)*; Tampa Bay Storm (2012)*; Milwaukee Mustangs (2012); Cleveland Gladiators (2013); Nebraska Danger (2013–2015, 2017)
- * Offseason or practice squad member only

Awards and highlights
- Second-team All-IFL (2014)

Career AFL statistics
- Tackles: 95
- Forced Fumbles: 1
- Fumble Recoveries: 2
- Interceptions: 1
- Kickoff Return Yards: 279
- Stats at ArenaFan.com

Jamar Love (born November 8, 1986) is an American former professional football cornerback. He was signed by the New England Patriots as an undrafted free agent in 2009. He played college football at Arkansas.

Love was also a member of the Dallas Cowboys, Tampa Bay Buccaneers, Tennessee Titans, Saskatchewan Roughriders, Tampa Bay Storm, Milwaukee Mustangs, Cleveland Gladiators, and Nebraska Danger. Love was an All-IFL selection in his career.
