= Claude Wroten =

American gridiron football player (born 1983)

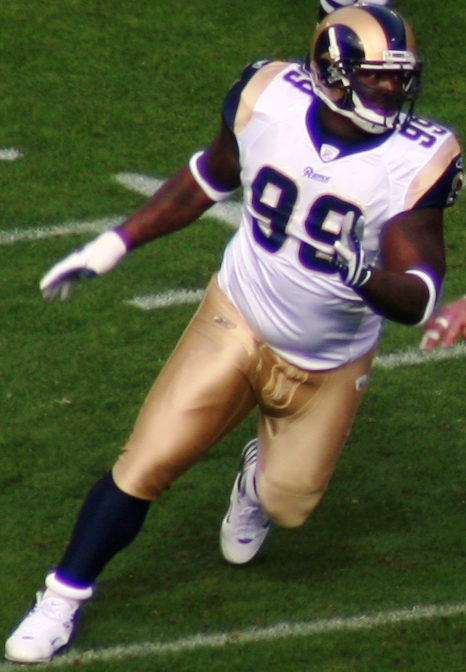
- Wroten with the St. Louis Rams in 2007

No. 99, 95
- Position: Defensive tackle

Personal information
- Born: September 16, 1983 (age 43); Bastrop, Louisiana, U.S.
- Listed height: 6 ft 2 in (1.88 m)
- Listed weight: 295 lb (134 kg)

Career information
- High school: Bastrop
- College: LSU
- NFL draft: 2006: 3rd round, 68th overall pick

Career history
- St. Louis Rams (2006–2008); Florida Tuskers (2009–2010); Toronto Argonauts (2011); Edmonton Eskimos (2012); Marion Blue Racers (2013); Missouri Monsters (2013); Orlando Predators (2013); Nebraska Danger (2013–2015)

Awards and highlights
- Second-team All-American (2005); First-team All-SEC (2005); Second-team All-SEC (2004)

Career NFL statistics
- Total tackles: 27
- Sacks: 1.5
- Forced fumbles: 1
- Stats at Pro Football Reference
- Stats at CFL.ca (archive)
- Stats at ArenaFan.com

Claude James Wroten (born September 16, 1983) is an American former professional football player who was a defensive tackle in the National Football League (NFL). He was selected by the St. Louis Rams in the third round of the 2006 NFL draft. He played college football for the LSU Tigers.

He was suspended by the NFL after repeated violations of the league's substance abuse policy. He was waived by the Rams on March 3, 2010. Wroten was re-instated by the NFL on August 23, 2010.

== Early life ==
Wroten attended Bastrop High School in Bastrop, Louisiana.

== College career ==
=== Mississippi Delta ===
Lettered twice at Mississippi Delta Community College, making 53 tackles, 15 sacks, three forced fumbles, and two fumble recoveries in 2003 before transferring to LSU.

=== LSU ===
Wroten was first-team All-SEC by College Football News and second-team All-SEC by the Associated Press and the SEC Coaches. He played 12 games with nine starts. He recorded 44 tackles, 12 tackles for losses and 6 sacks. He had 3 tackles and 1 sack for an 8-yard loss against Iowa in the Capital One Bowl. As a senior in 2005 he was named first-team All-America by College Football News and second-team All-America by the Sporting News and named First-team All-SEC by both the league's coaches and the AP. He played in 13 games with 12 starts. He had 49 tackles, 10.5 tackles for losses and 6 sacks and 26 quarterback hurries.

== Professional career ==
=== Pre-draft ===
Pre-draft measurables
Height	Weight	Arm length	Hand span	Vertical jump	Broad jump	Bench press
6 ft 2 in (1.88 m)	302 lb (137 kg)	33 in (0.84 m)	9 7/8 in (0.25 m)	28.5 in (0.72 m)	8 ft 10 in (2.69 m)	24 reps
All values from NFL Combine/Pro Day

Wroten had a chance at being a first-round pick after LSU's season ended, then police stopped him for speeding in Sterlington, Louisiana, on January 4, 2006, and arrested him on charges of possession of marijuana with intent to distribute. However, the district attorney declined the case.

=== St. Louis Rams ===
Wroten was selected by the St. Louis Rams in the third round of the 2006 NFL draft with the 68th overall pick. On July 25, Wroten signed a four-year, $2.415 million contract with the Rams. Wroten played 15 games as a rookie, totaling 13 tackles a sack and a forced fumble.

In 2007, Wroten recorded 13 tackles and a half-sack. He served a four-game suspension in 2007 for violation of the NFL substance abuse policy.

On July 23, 2008, Wroten was suspended without pay (he was due $445,000 salary) for the 2008 NFL season for his third violation the NFL's substance abuse policy. The Rams have asked suspended Wroten to return part of his rookie signing bonus, filing a grievance against Wroten, who received an $805,000 signing bonus his rookie contract. The Rams sought $201,250 back.

=== Florida Tuskers ===
Wroten was signed by the Florida Tuskers of the United Football League on August 17, 2009.

=== Toronto Argonauts ===
On April 21, 2011, Wroten was signed by the Toronto Argonauts of the Canadian Football League. Released by the Argonauts on June 17, 2012.

=== Edmonton Eskimos ===
Wroten signed with the Edmonton Eskimos on August 9, 2012.

=== Marion Blue Racers ===
Wroten signed with the Marion Blue Racers of the Continental Indoor Football League for the 2013 season.

=== Orlando Predators ===
Wroten signed with the Orlando Predators of the Arena Football League on May 9, 2013.

=== Nebraska Danger ===
Wroten signed during the 2014 season with the Nebraska Danger of the Indoor Football League. On May 8, 2015, Wroten was released by the Danger.
