= Lionell Singleton =

American football player (born 1985)

No. 2
- Position: Defensive back

Personal information
- Born: November 13, 1985 (age 40)
- Listed height: 5 ft 10 in (1.78 m)
- Listed weight: 180 lb (82 kg)

Career information
- High school: Tallahassee (FL) Florida
- College: Florida International
- NFL draft: 2008: undrafted

Career history
- Alabama Vipers (2010); Tri-Cities Fever (2010—2015)

Awards and highlights
- 2× 1st Team All-IFL (2012, 2013); IFL's Top 10 Players #8 (2013); IFL's Adam Pringle Award (2013); IFL Hall of Fame; 2× Second-team All-Sun Belt (2006, 2007)

Career AFL statistics
- Tackles: 5
- Pass breakups: 1
- Stats at ArenaFan.com

Lionell Singleton (born November 13, 1985) is a former professional indoor football defensive back for the Alabama Vipers and the Tri-Cities Fever. He was signed by the Alabama Vipers as an undrafted free agent in 2010. He played college football at Florida International. Singleton was released by the Fever on March 24, 2015, and announced his retirement following the release. He was inducted into the Indoor Football League Hall of Fame in 2016.
