= Bemidji Axemen =

Indoor football team in Minnesota

Logo

General information
- Founded: 2013
- Folded: 2015
- Headquartered: Sanford Center in Bemidji, Minnesota
- Colors: Red, blue, silver, white
- Mascot: Axel the Axeman
- MinnesotaAxemen.com

Personnel
- Owners: Phil Sallberg; Nate Coffin; Dan Skaug; Tom Ulve
- General manager: Richard Davis
- Head coach: Richard Davis
- President: Tom Ulve

Team history
- Bemidji Axeman (2014–2015); Minnesota Axemen

Home fields
- Sanford Center (2014–2015)

League / conference affiliations
- Indoor Football League (2014–2015): United Conference (2014–2015)

Championships
- League championships: 0; 0
- Conference championships: 0; 0
- Division championships: 0; 0

The Bemidji Axemen were a professional indoor football team based in Bemidji, Minnesota. The Axemen joined the Indoor Football League (IFL) as an expansion team in 2013 and first took the field for the 2014 season. They participated in the United Conference of the IFL. The Axemen played their home games at the Sanford Center in Bemidji.

The Axemen are the first-ever indoor/arena football team to call Bemidji home, as well as Minnesota's first indoor/arena football team since the Duluth-Superior Lumberjacks and the Mankato-based Minnesota Purple Rage both played in the original Indoor Football League for the 2000 season, the league's last before folding.

The team would change their name to the Minnesota Axemen prior to the 2016 season. However, the league terminated the franchise's membership as they failed to meet the league's operational standards and commitments. Thus, the franchise folded on November 24, 2015

== History ==
On July 15, 2013, the Bemidji Pioneer reported that the IFL was looking to expand to Northern Minnesota and the Sanford Center, with a press conference taking place three days later on July 18. League expansion director and Cedar Rapids Titans owner Chris Kokalis would state that for a team to begin play for the 2014 season, ownership had to be found between late August and early September at the latest. Reports of a potential ownership group forming surfaced on August 15. Five days later, on August 20, the IFL confirmed that an agreement had been reached and a team would indeed be coming to Bemidji, with an official press conference scheduled for the following day.

The team was officially named the Bemidji Axemen on September 5, 2013; the name is partly meant to reflect Bemidji's history and incorporated the Paul Bunyan tale so linked with the area. On February 22, 2014, the Axemen won their inaugural regular season game, claiming victory over the Green Bay Blizzard. The team performed well through early May, posting a 5-4 record, but then collapsed with 5 consecutive losses to complete the season at 5-9 and 3rd place in the United Conference. Fuller was fired after the end of the season.

Under the leadership of new head coach Dixie Wooten, the Axemen struggled out of the gate, dropping their first two games. The Axemen bounced back quickly, winning their next two games to even their record at 2-2. The Axemen struggled with consistency at the quarterback position, having 4 different players start during the first 10 games of the season. After a 27-37 loss to the Colorado Ice, Wooten was released as the head coach of the Axemen, replaced by Lee Patten as the interim head coach.

=== Changes and folding ===
Two weeks after the Axemen's 2015 season had ended, the team named Richard Davis the team's fourth head coach in team history. Davis was also named the team's general manager. On August, 20, 2015, he announced that the team will change its name to the Minnesota Axemen prior to the start of the 2016 season as a new LLC will be created known as Minnesota Axemen, LLC. Said name change was confirmed on September 25, 2015.

On November 24, 2015, the league terminated the Axemen's franchise membership as they failed to meet the league's operational standards and commitments according to league commissioner Mike Allshouse.

== Players ==
=== All-League selections ===
- WR Ryan Balentine (1), Josh Jarboe (1)
- DL Jordan Morgan (1)
- KR Mulku Kalokoh (1)

=== Individual awards ===
The following is a list of all Axemen players who have won league Awards

Adam Pringle Award
Season	Player	Position
2014	Cody Kirby	QB

Special Teams Player of the Year
Season	Player	Position
2015	Mulku Kalokoh	KR

== Statistics and records ==
=== Season-by-season results ===
League champions	Conference champions	Division champions	Wild card berth	League leader

Season	Team	League	Conference	Division	Regular season				Postseason results
Season	Team	League	Conference	Division	Finish	Wins	Losses	Ties	Postseason results
2014	2014	IFL	United		3rd	5	9	0	
2015	2015	IFL	United		5th	2	12	0	
Totals						7	21	0	All-time regular season record (2014–2015)
Totals						0	0	—	All-time postseason record (2014–2015)
Totals						7	21	0	All-time regular season and postseason record (2014–2015)

=== Head coach records ===
Name	Term	Regular season				Playoffs		Awards
Name	Term	W	L	T	Win%	W	L	Awards
Robert Fuller	2014	5	9	0	.357	0	0	
Dixie Wooten	2015	2	8	0	.200	0	0	
Lee Patten	2015	0	4	0	.000	0	0	
Richard Davis	2016	0	0	0	–	0	0	
