= Nebraska Danger =

Professional indoor football team based in Grand Island, Nebraska

Logo

General information
- Founded: 2010
- Folded: 2019
- Headquartered: Eihusen Arena in Grand Island, Nebraska
- Colors: Black, gray, white
- Mascot: Bones
- DangerFootball.com

Personnel
- Owners: Charlie Bosselman; Laurie Bosselman; Dustin Lofing; Brandi Bosselman-Lofing
- President: Charlie Bosselman

Team history
- Nebraska Danger (2011–2019)

Home fields
- Eihusen Arena (2011–2019)

League / conference affiliations
- Indoor Football League (2011–2019): United Conference (2011); Great Plains Division (2011); Intense Conference (2012–2017)

Championships
- Conference championships: 3: 2013, 2014, 2015

Playoff appearances (7)
- 2013, 2014, 2015, 2016, 2017, 2018, 2019

The Nebraska Danger was a professional indoor football team based in Grand Island, Nebraska, and a member of the Indoor Football League (IFL). The team was founded in 2011 by Charlie Bosselman as an expansion member of the IFL. The Danger played their home games at Eihusen Arena.

In 2011 and 2012, the Nebraska Danger was selected as having the IFL's Best Fans. In 2013, the Danger were named IFL Franchise of the Year. Former general manager Mike McCoy was named 2013 IFL Executive of the Year and quarterback Jameel Sewell was named the 2013 IFL Most Valuable Player and Offensive Player of the Year.

== History ==
On October 4, 2010, Bosselman Entertainment LLC announced the formation of Nebraska Danger as an expansion member of the Indoor Football League (IFL) for the 2011 season. At the press conference, team owner Charlie Bosselman announced that Sean Ponder would be the team's inaugural head coach, however after just two months on the job, Ponder left the Danger for personal reasons, and Mike Davis was named head coach. On March 7, 2011, the Danger defeated the Wichita Wild 70–59, in the team's first game.

On June 28, 2014, the Danger traveled to Sioux Falls, South Dakota, for a second-straight year looking to defeat the Storm for the United Bowl. The Danger came up short again, falling 46–63.

On September 7, 2016, Hurtis Chinn was promoted to head coach after Mike Davis announced he was taking a role with the Saskatchewan Roughriders.

After the 2019 season, the Bosselman family announced they were looking to sell the team. No owner was found before the deadline for participating in the 2020 season.

== Season-by-season results ==
League champions	Conference champions	Division champions	Playoff berth	League leader

Season	Team	League	Conference	Division	Regular season				Postseason results
Season	Team	League	Conference	Division	Finish	Wins	Losses	Ties	Postseason results
2011	2011	IFL	United	Great Plains	4th	3	11		
2012	2012	IFL	Intense		6th	5	9		
2013	2013	IFL	Intense		1st	10	4		Won Intense Conference Championship (Colorado) 55–50; Lost 2013 United Bowl (Sioux Falls) 40–43
2014	2014	IFL	Intense		2nd	10	4		Won Intense Conference Championship (Colorado) 45–15; Lost 2014 United Bowl (Sioux Falls) 46–63
2015	2015	IFL	Intense		1st	10	4		Won Intense Conference Championship (Fever) 86–43; Lost 2015 United Bowl (Storm) 27–62
2016	2016	IFL	Intense		3rd	6	10		Won Intense Conference Wild Card (Billings) 64–52; Lost Intense Conference Championship (Spokane) 44–55
2017	2017	IFL	Intense		2nd	9	7		Lost Intense Conference Championship (Arizona) 36–62
2018	2018	IFL			4th	4	10		Lost Semifinal (Iowa) 17–48
2019	2019	IFL			5th	7	7		Won First Round (Green Bay) 45–40; Lost Semifinal (Arizona) 45–62
Totals						64	66	0	All-time regular season record (2011–2019)
Totals						5	7	—	All-time postseason record (2011–2019)
Totals						69	73	0	All-time regular season and postseason record (2011–2019)

== Notable coaches ==
=== Head coaches ===
Name	Term	Regular season				Playoffs		Awards
Name	Term	W	L	T	Win%	W	L	Awards
Mike Davis	2011–2016	44	42	0	.512	4	4	
Hurtis Chinn	2017	9	7	0	.563	0	1	
Mark Stoute	2018	4	7	0	.364	—	—	
Adam Shackleford / Pig Brown (interim co-coaches)	2018	0	3	0	.000	0	1	
Pig Brown	2019	7	7	0	.500	1	1	

- Xzavie Jackson – Defensive line coach
- Jameel Sewell – Offensive coordinator QB/RB/WR coach

== Players ==
=== All-League selections ===
- QB Jameel Sewell (2)
- RB Waymon James (1)
- WR Kayne Farquharson (3), O. J. Simpson (1)
- OL Darius Savage (4), Trevis Turner (1)
- DL Claude Wroten (1), Justin Edison (1), Eze Obiora, (1)
- LB Maurice Simpkins (1), Cornelius Brown (1)
- DB Jamar Love (1), Jabari Gorman (1), Trey Wafford (1)
- K Joe Houston (1)

=== Individual awards ===
The following is a list of all Danger players who have won league awards:

Most Improved Player
Season	Player	Position
2017	Rocky Hinds	QB

Most Valuable Player
Season	Player	Position
2013	Jameel Sewell	QB
2015	Jameel Sewell	QB

Offensive Player of the Year
Season	Player	Position
2013	Jameel Sewell	QB

Offensive Rookie of the Year
Season	Player	Position
2015	Waymon James	RB
2019	Tommy Armstrong Jr.	QB

Defensive Rookie of the Year
Season	Player	Position
2016	Jabari Gorman	DB
2017	Trey Wafford	DB
