= Wyoming Cavalry =

Professional indoor football team

Logo

General information
- Founded: 2000
- Folded: 2014
- Headquartered: Casper Events Center in Casper, Wyoming
- Colors: Navy blue, Old gold
- WyomingCavalry.com

Personnel
- Owner: Mitch Zimmerman (Dominic Montero 2025)
- General manager: Mike Layton
- Head coach: Ryan Lingenfelder

Team history
- Casper Cavalry (2000); Wyoming Cavalry (2001–2014)

Home fields
- Casper Events Center (2000–2014)

League / conference affiliations
- Indoor Football League (2000): Western Division (2000); National Indoor Football League (2001–2007): Central Division (2001); Pacific Conference (2002–2007); Western Division (2002–2006); American Indoor Football (2008–2010, 2026): Western Conference (2008); West Division (2008–2010); Indoor Football League (2011–2014): Intense Conference (2011–2014); Mountain West Division (2011)

Championships
- League championships: 0; 0
- Conference championships: 1; 2008
- Division championships: 0; 0

Playoff appearances (9)
- 2000, 2001, 2005, 2006, 2007, 2008, 2009, 2010, 2011

The Wyoming Cavalry are an American professional indoor football team based in Gillette, Wyoming. The Cavalry began play in 2000 as an expansion member of the original Indoor Football League as the Casper Cavalry. The Cavalry became a charter member of the National Indoor Football League (NIFL) in 2001 following the original IFL's purchase by the Arena Football League's Orlando Predators. They were most recently members of the Intense Conference in the Indoor Football League (IFL). The move in 2001 also brought a franchise name change to the current Wyoming Cavalry. The team then joined the American Indoor Football Association (AIFA) in 2008 after the NIFL's demise. With the AIFA's presence in the Western United States dwindling, the Cavalry joined the IFL in 2011. In September, 2014, majority owner Mitch Zimmerman announced that the team would cease operations.

A new version of the Cavalry will play their home games at the Wyoming Center at the CAM-PLEX in Gillette, Wyoming for American Indoor Football starting in 2026.

== History ==
=== Original franchise (2000-2014) ===
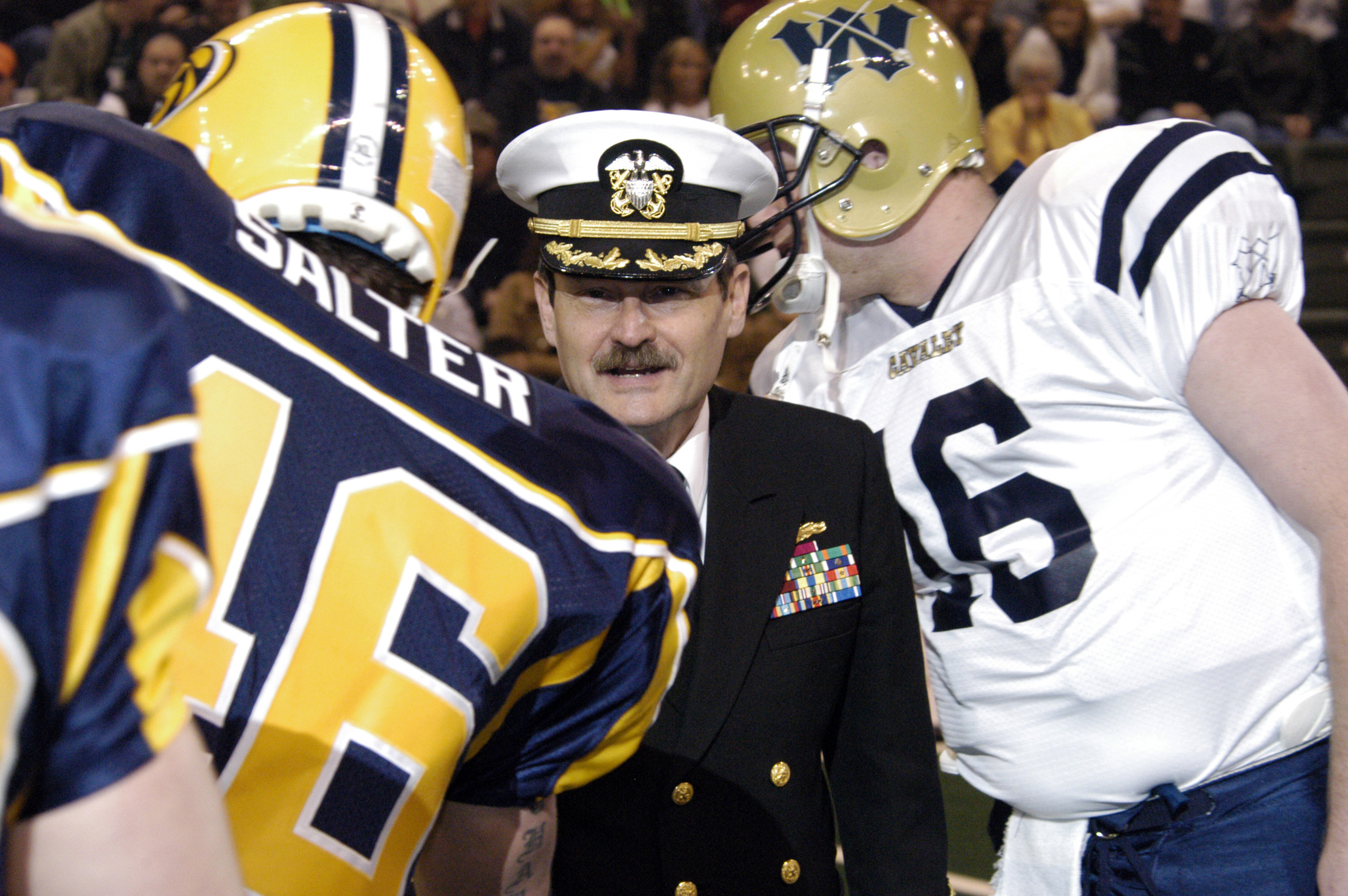
A Cavalry player shaking hands during pregame

The team began play in 2000 as an expansion member of the original Indoor Football League as the Casper Cavalry. Despite a successful inaugural season, they fell in the playoffs to the Black Hills Machine. When the original IFL folded, the Cavalry moved to the newly formed National Indoor Football League as the "Wyoming Cavalry" and became a charter member. The team also saw front office changes, as they were purchased by a local ownership group, headed by Mike Argeri Layton. The team was decently successful, making the playoffs in four of their seven overall seasons, as well as making it to the inaugural Indoor Bowl, losing to the Mississippi Fire Dogs.

On August 18, 2007, the Cavalry officially announced they would join the American Indoor Football Association as a flagship team of the league's new Western Division. On July 26, 2009, the Cavalry hosted the Reading Express in AIFA Bowl III and were defeated 65–42. On July 25, 2010, the Cavalry traveled to Baltimore to take on the Mariners in AIFA Bowl IV and would go on to lose 57–42. As of the end of the 2010 season, the Cavalry are 0–5 in championship games.

On September 1, 2010, the Cavalry announced they would be joining the Indoor Football League as an expansion member for the 2011 season.

For the 2013 season, its third in the IFL, the Cavalry hired rookie head coach Ryan Lingenfelder to replace longtime head coach Dan "Majic" Maciejczak. Lingenfelder, a former AFL player, served as defensive coordinator of the Tri-Cities Fever for the previous three seasons. Shortly before the 2013 season began, the owner of the Cheyenne Warriors died and the IFL revised its schedule to accommodate the now 9-team league. The Cavalry had been scheduled to play two games against the projected in-state rival. Barney O'Donnell III joined the team as the new starting quarterback. After compiling a 2–24 record in 2 seasons, Lingenfelder was relieved of his coaching duties. In September 2014, majority owner Mitch Zimmerman announced that the team would cease operations. Ownership cited a decline in attendance, despite robust sponsorship.

=== Cavalry legacy reborn (AIF, 2026) ===
The Wyoming Cavalry name lives on with a new expansion team which is set to play for American Indoor Football in Gillette, Wyoming, in 2026 at the Wyoming Center at the CAM-PLEX. Dominic Montero, founder of the current incarnations of AIF and the Cavalry, and former owners Mike and Argeri Layton granted a joint interview with Cowboy State Daily in which the Laytons gave their blessing to Montero for the new venture.

== Season-by-season ==
Season records
Season	W	L	T	Finish	Playoff results
Casper Cavalry (IFL)
2000	9	5	0	3rd WC Northern	Lost Round 1 (Black Hills)
Wyoming Cavalry (NIFL)
2001	8	6	0	2nd Pacific Central	Won Round 1 (Utah); Won Round 2 (Sioux Falls); Lost Indoor Bowl I (Mississippi)
2002	3	11	0	5th Pacific West	--
2003	4	10	0	6th Pacific West	--
2004	5	9	0	3rd Pacific West	--
2005	10	4	0	2nd Pacific West	Lost Round 1 (Tri-Cities)
2006	8	6	0	2nd Pacific West	Lost Round 1 (Tri-Cities)
2007	7	1	0	1st Pacific	
Wyoming Cavalry (AIFA)
2008	11	3	0	1st WC West	Won WCW Round 1 (Arizona); Won Divisional (Mississippi); Lost AIFA Championship Bowl II (Florence)
2009	12	2	0	1st West	Won Divisional (Utah Valley); Lost AIFA Championship Bowl III (Reading)
2010	13	1	0	1st West	Won Divisional (San Jose); Lost AIFA Championship Bowl IV (Baltimore)
Wyoming Cavalry (IFL)
2011	9	5	0	2nd Mountain West	Lost Round 1 (Allen)
2012	4	10	0	7th Intense	
2013	1	13	0	4th Intense	--
2014	1	13	0	4th Intense	--
Totals	105	109	0	(including playoffs)	

== Notable players ==
=== Awards and honors ===
The following is a list of all Cavalry players who have won league Awards

Season	Player	Position	Award
2012	Jasonus Tillary	WR	Offensive Rookie of the Year

=== All-IFL players ===
The following Cavalry players were named to All-IFL teams:

- WR Jasonus Tillary (1), Troy Evans (1), Samuel Charles (1)
- K Travis Atter (1)

=== All-NIFL players ===
The following Cavalry players have been named to All-NIFL Teams:

- QB Matt Strand (2)
- RB James Jones (1)
- WR Dante Dudley (2)
- DL Marcus Jones (1)
- DB Brandon Everage (1)
- DB Brian Guthrie (1)
- DL Tyrone Saterfield (1)
- LB Jeff Main (3)

== Head coaches ==
Name	Term	Regular season				Playoffs		Awards
Name	Term	W	L	T	Win%	W	L	Awards
Chris Stein	2000, 2004	14	13	0	.519	0	1	
Scott Hafley	2001	6	5	0	.545	2	1	
Tyrone Fittje	2002–2003	7	21	0	.250	0	0	
Shannon Moore	2005–2006	18	8	0	.692	0	2	
Dan Maciejczak	2007–2012	52	18	0	.743	4	4	
Ryan Lingenfelder	2013–2014	2	24	0	.077	0	0	
