= Colorado Crush (IFL) =

Indoor football team

Logo

General information
- Founded: 2006
- Folded: 2017
- Headquartered: Budweiser Events Center in Loveland, Colorado
- Colors: Navy blue, orange, Carolina blue, white
- Mascot: Ambush
- ColoradoCrushFootball.com

Personnel
- Owner: Project Fanchise
- Head coach: Marvin Jones

Team history
- Colorado Ice (2006–2015); Colorado Crush (2016–2017)

Home fields
- Budweiser Events Center (2007–2017)

League / conference affiliations
- United Indoor Football (2007–2008): Western Division (2007–2008); Indoor Football League (2009–2017): Intense Conference (2009); Pacific Division (2009); United Conference (2010); Central West Division (2010); Intense Conference (2011–2017); Mountain West Division (2011)

Championships
- Division championships: 1 Mountain West: 2011

Playoff appearances (6)
- UIF: 2007, IFL: 2009, 2011, 2012, 2013, 2014

The Colorado Crush were a professional indoor football team. The Crush played its home games at the Budweiser Events Center in Loveland, Colorado, outside Fort Collins.

The Crush began play in 2007 as the Colorado Ice, an expansion member of United Indoor Football (UIF) and joined the Indoor Football League as part of the UIF-Intense Football League merger of 2009. Ahead of the 2016 season, the team changed its name to the Colorado Crush, after the John Elway-owned team of the same name that played in the Arena Football League from 2003 until its suspension of operations in 2008. Despite the same name, this Crush organization is not connected to the original.

== History ==
In July 2006, Colorado real estate executive, Danny DeGrande, was awarded an expansion franchise of United Indoor Football to begin play in 2007. The Ice were a sub-.500 team during their first four years of existence but still managed to make the playoffs twice in 2007 and 2009.

On April 1, 2010, Tom Wigley was announced as the new owner of the Ice. The 2011 season saw an overhaul of the team's roster and a reversal of its fortunes as the Ice began the season with seven straight wins and finished with an 11–3 record plus the Mountain West Division title and their first winning season. The Ice fell to the Tri-Cities Fever in the first round of the playoffs. This was Collins Sanders' last season as head coach before his promotion to general manager in 2012.

In 2012, Heron O'Neal was hired as head coach. They recorded an 8–6 record and reached the playoffs but lost to the Tri-Cities Fever in the first round. O'Neal returned as head coach for 2013 and a strong start with three consecutive home wins. Both of the Ice's 2012 All-IFL Team players returned for the 2013 season.

Heron O'Neal returned as head coach for a third season in 2014. From 2011 to 2014, the team made the playoffs for four straight seasons but remained winless in the postseason. They competed Intense Conference Championship game in back-to-back seasons, losing both to the Nebraska Danger.

On July 15, 2015, the Colorado Ice became the new Colorado Crush one year after the trademark for the original AFL franchise name expired. On March 7, 2016, owner Thomas Wigley announced the team was for sale after he was diagnosed as terminally ill. Wigley assured that the team would finish 2016 season, but due to his health he would not be able to continue operations himself. In October 2016, the Crush's new owners were announced as Project FANchise, a group that also started the 2017 expansion Salt Lake Screaming Eagles. Project FANchise-owned teams planned to be operated in conjunction with fan input by allowing them vote on every aspect of the team including hiring the head coach, signing players, and calling plays. Due to purchasing the team late in the offseason, this system was not implemented for the Crush in the 2017 season. However, during their first season under Project FANchise, it was announced that FANchise was planning its own league for the 2018 season, called the Interactive Football League, and would not be operating any teams in the Indoor Football League. After the 2017 season ended, the Crush website was shut down and no formal announcement on the team's future was made.

== Players ==
=== Awards and honors ===
The following is a list of all Ice/Crush players who have won league Awards

=== All-IFL players ===
The following Ice players were named to All-IFL teams:

- QB Willie Copeland (1)
- WR Kyle Kaiser (4), Demarius Washington (1)
- OL Collin Cordell (1), Michael Trice (2), James Atoe (1)
- DL Gabe Knapton (1), Michael Stover (1), Jason Jones (1)
- LB Landon Jones (1)
- LB/DB Joe Thornton (1)
- DB Idly Etienne (1), Jovan Jackson (1), Corey Sample (2), Rashard Smith (1)
- K Aric Goodman (1)
- KR Daniel Lindsey (1)
- Ironman Eryk Anders (1)

=== Individual awards ===
Defensive Rookie of the Year
| Season | Player | Position |
| 2010 | Landon Jones | LB |

Most Improved Player
| Season | Player | Position |
| 2011 | David Knighton | QB |

Most Valuable Player
| Season | Player | Position |
| 2014 | Willie Copeland | QB |

Offensive Player of the Year
| Season | Player | Position |
| 2016 | Demarius Washington | WR |

== Statistics and records ==
=== Season-by-season results ===
| League champions | Conference champions | Division champions | Wild card berth | League leader |

| Season | Team | League | Conference | Division | Regular season | | | | Postseason results |
| Season | Team | League | Conference | Division | Finish | Wins | Losses | Ties | Postseason results |
|---|---|---|---|---|---|---|---|---|---|
| 2007 | 2007 | UIF | | Western | 3rd | 6 | 9 | 0 | Lost Western Division Semifinals (Sioux Falls) 16–44 |
| 2008 | 2008 | UIF | | Western | 4th | 6 | 8 | 0 | |
| 2009 | 2009 | IFL | Intense | Pacific | 3rd | 5 | 9 | 0 | Lost Wild Card (Fairbanks) 14–42 |
| 2010 | 2010 | IFL | United | Central West | 5th | 2 | 12 | 0 | |
| 2011 | 2011 | IFL | Intense | Mountain West | 1st | 11 | 3 | 0 | Lost Intense Conference Semifinals (Tri-Cities) 42–45 |
| 2012 | 2012 | IFL | Intense | | 4th | 8 | 6 | 0 | Lost Intense Conference Semifinals (Tri-Cities) 43–52 |
| 2013 | 2013 | IFL | Intense | | 2nd | 9 | 5 | 0 | Lost Intense Conference Championship (Nebraska) 50–55 |
| 2014 | 2014 | IFL | Intense | | 1st | 10 | 4 | 0 | Lost Intense Conference Championship (Nebraska) 15–45 |
| 2015 | 2015 | IFL | Intense | | 3rd | 6 | 8 | 0 | |
| 2016 | 2016 | IFL | Intense | | 4th | 4 | 12 | 0 | |
| 2017 | 2017 | IFL | Intense | | 4th | 3 | 13 | 0 | |
| Totals | | | | | | 70 | 89 | 0 | All-time regular season record (2007–2017) |
| Totals | | | | | | 0 | 6 | — | All-time postseason record (2007–2017) |
| Totals | | | | | | 70 | 95 | 0 | All-time regular season and postseason record (2007–2017) |

=== Head coach records ===
| Name | Term | Regular season | | | | Playoffs | | Awards |
| Name | Term | W | L | T | Win% | W | L | Awards |
|---|---|---|---|---|---|---|---|---|
| Collins Sanders | 2007–2011 | 30 | 41 | 0 | .423 | 0 | 3 | |
| Heron O'Neal | 2012–2016 | 37 | 35 | 0 | .514 | 0 | 3 | IFL Coach of the Year (2014) |
| Jose Jefferson | 2017 | 2 | 6 | 0 | .250 | 0 | 0 | |
| Marvin Jones | 2017 | 1 | 7 | 0 | .125 | 0 | 0 | |

== Radio ==
Games and weekly coach's show are broadcast on KFKA (1310 AM).
