= Blue Arena =

Arena in Loveland, Colorado, United States

Coordinates: 40°26′38″N 104°59′22″W

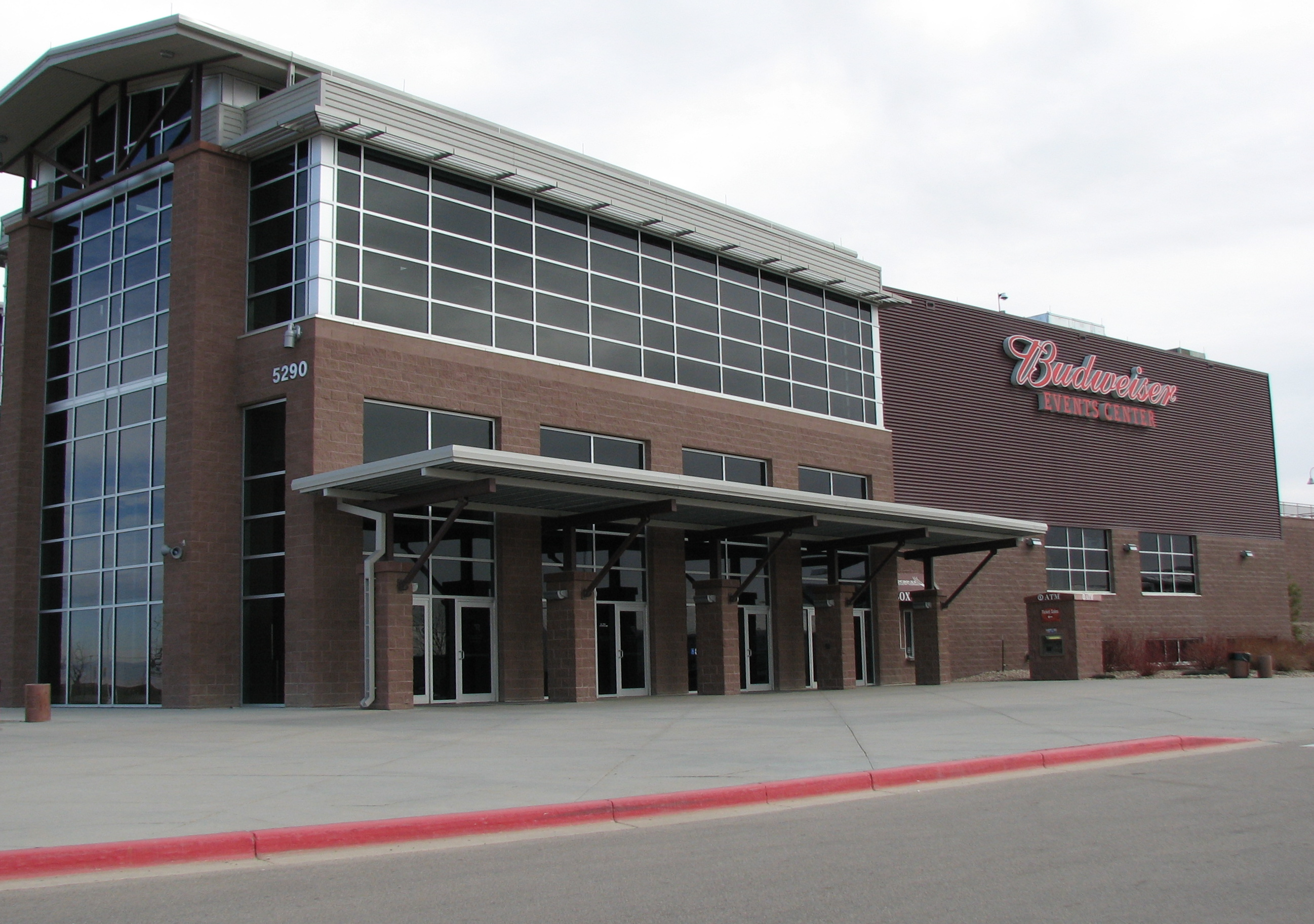
- Exterior of venue (c.2008)

- Location within Colorado Location within the United States
- Former names: Budweiser Events Center (2003–2023)
- Address: 5290 Arena Circle
- Location: Loveland, Colorado, U.S.
- Owner: Larimer County
- Operator: OVG360
- Capacity: 7,500 Sports capacity: Basketball: 6,000; Hockey: 5,289 (2003-2021) 5,041 (2021-2022) 5,089 (2022-Present)

Construction
- Groundbreaking: August 26, 2002
- Opened: September 20, 2003
- Cost: $28 million ($50.1 million in 2025 dollars)
- Architects: PBK Architects; Bullock Smith & Partners; Kenney & Associates Inc.
- Structural engineers: KL&A, Inc.
- Services engineers: US Engineering; Nolte Associates
- General contractor: Neenan Construction
- Main contractor: Delta Construction

Tenants
- Colorado Eagles (CHL/ECHL/AHL) (2003–present); Colorado Chill (NWBL) (2004–2006); Colorado Lightning (PASL) (2008–2009); Colorado Crush (IFL) (2016–2017); Denver Dream (LFL) (2017–2019); Denver Rush (X-League) (2022–present); Colorado Spartans (NAL) (2024)

Website
- Venue Website

The Blue Arena (formerly Budweiser Events Center) is a multi-purpose arena in Loveland, Colorado, 55 mi (89 km) northeast of Denver. It has 24 luxury suites, 777 club seats and 6,800 general admission seats. The arena is located on The Ranch Events Complex (formerly the Larimer County Fairgrounds and Events Complex) and is owned by Larimer County, Colorado. The facility and ticket sales are managed by OVG360 (a division of Oak View Group). It is home to the AHL Colorado Eagles ice hockey team and is the former home of the Colorado Lightning indoor soccer team, the Colorado Chill women's basketball team, and the Denver Dream women's football team.

It was also home to the Colorado Ice/Crush indoor football team from 2007 until 2017 and served as home of the Colorado Spartans starting in 2024. As of 2025, the Spartans now play their home games at the Denver Coliseum in Denver, Colorado.

== History ==
Construction was completed and doors opened for the first event on September 20, 2003, with a sold-out exhibition hockey game between the Colorado Avalanche and the Florida Panthers.

The Colorado Eagles established a new record for minor league professional hockey with their 145th consecutive regular-season sellout, set on January 12, 2008, in a victory vs. rival Rocky Mountain Rage. Including playoff games, the Eagles had sold out 181 consecutive games total – every single game during their first 4½ years of operation.

Blue Arena was previously named the Budweiser Events Center, but changed after Budweiser's contract expired in October, 2023 after which Blue Federal Credit Union was awarded the contract.

== Notable events ==
The Colorado Eagles hosted the 2009 Central Hockey League All-Star Game and the 2013 ECHL All-Star Game at the Blue Arena.

The Events Center has played host to: musicians Widespread Panic, David Bowie, Rod Stewart, Yes, and ZZ Top; comedians Bill Cosby, Ron White, Carlos Mencia, Gabriel Iglesias & Larry the Cable Guy; as well as Cirque Du Soleil, Ringling Bros. Barnum & Bailey Circus, Disney on Ice, The Wiggles, Sesame Street Live, and The Harlem Globetrotters.

The Events Center will serve as a host for the 2026 NCAA Hockey Frozen Four Regional round and previously hosted the 2022 Frozen Four Regional.
