= Sanford Center =

Arena in Bemidji, Minnesota

- The Clinic, The Beaver Dam
- Interactive map of Sanford Center
- Location: 1111 Event Center Drive; Bemidji, Minnesota 56601
- Coordinates: 47.4634°N 94.8537°W
- Owner: City of Bemidji
- Operator: VenuWorks
- Capacity: 4,700 (ice hockey)
- Surface: 200' x 85' (Ice hockey)

Construction
- Groundbreaking: April 3, 2009
- Opened: October 15, 2010
- Cost: $74.97+ million
- Architects: Leo A Daly; Widseth Smith Nolting
- General contractor: Kraus-Anderson Construction Company

Tenants
- Bemidji State Beavers (NCAA) (2010–present); Bemidji Axemen (IFL) (2014–2015)

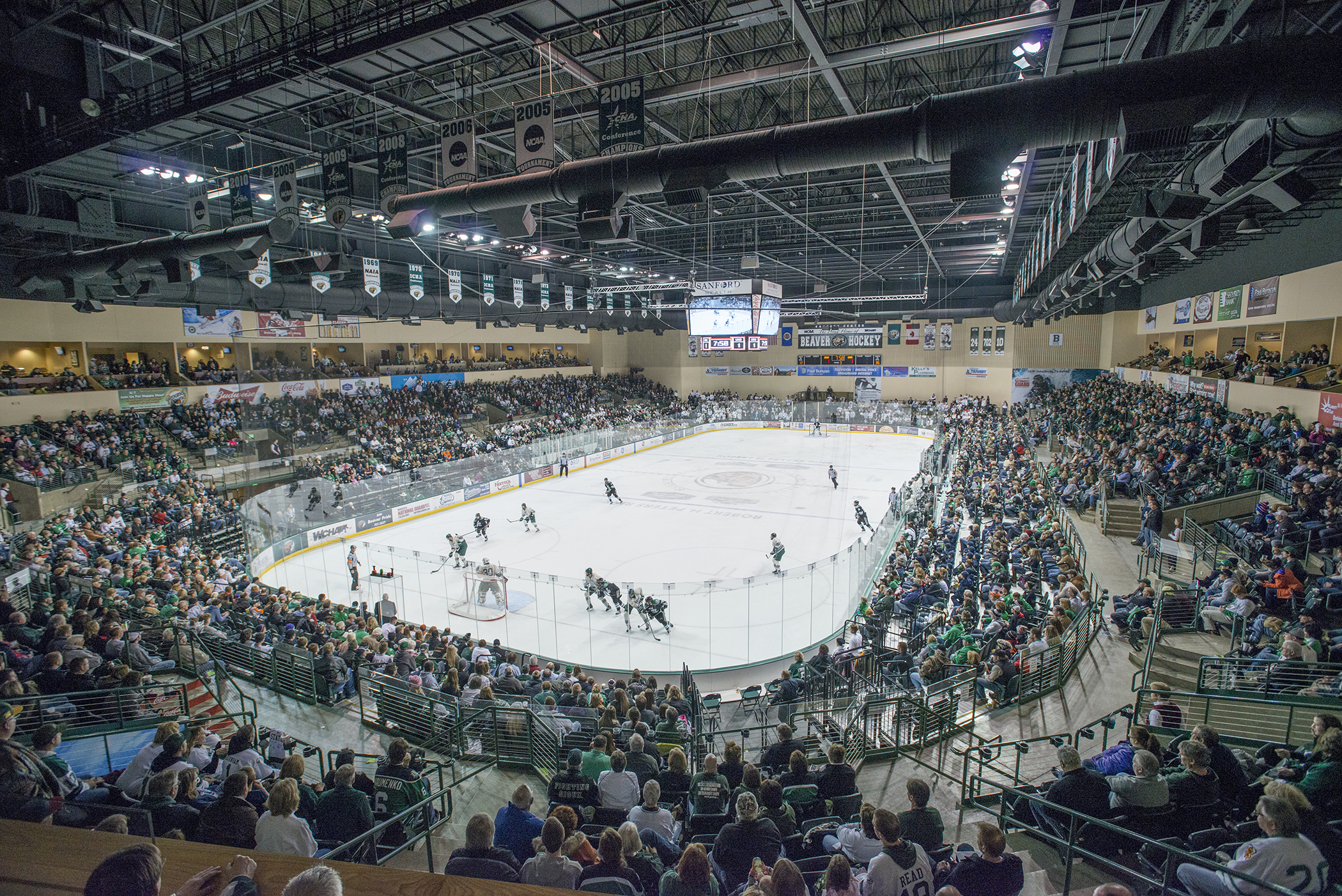
The Sanford Center in Bemidji, Minn.

The Sanford Center is a 4,700-seat multi-purpose arena and convention center in Bemidji, Minnesota, United States that opened in October 2010. On October 18, 2010, the venue was renamed from the Bemidji Regional Events Center to the Sanford Center after Sanford Health Systems purchased naming rights for $2 million over ten years.

On Friday, October 15, 2010, the arena began hosting the home games of the Bemidji State Beavers men's ice hockey of the Central Collegiate Hockey Association and Bemidji State Beavers women's ice hockey team of the Western Collegiate Hockey Association, replacing the aging 2,400-seat John S. Glas Field House.

Beginning with the 2014 season, the arena became home to the Bemidji Axemen of the Indoor Football League. The team was disbanded after the 2015 season.
