= Eihusen Arena =

Arena in Grand Island, Nebraska

- Interactive map of Eihusen Arena
- Location: 700 East Stolley Park Road; Grand Island, Nebraska 68801
- Coordinates: 40.905477°N 98.32989°W
- Owner: City of Grand Island
- Operator: Venuworks
- Capacity: 7,500 seats (6,000 concourse, 1,500 floor)

Construction
- Opened: 2006

Tenants
- Nebraska Danger (IFL) (2011–2019); Nebraska Siege (TAL) (2026–present)

Website
- heartlandeventscenter.com

The Eihusen Arena is a 7,500-seat multi-purpose arena in Grand Island, Nebraska, USA and is owned by the City of Grand Island.

Opened in 2006 as part of the Heartland Events Center at Fonner Park, it hosts local sporting events and concerts. In 2024, the Grand Island City Council hired Venuworks to manage the Heartland Events Center.

Eihusen Arena was also home to the Indoor Football League's Nebraska Danger, which began play in 2011.

The arena also serves as one of the concert venues for the Nebraska State Fair.

The Heartland Events Center changed its name to BigIron Events Center on June 24, 2026.
