= Tri-Cities Fever =

American indoor football team

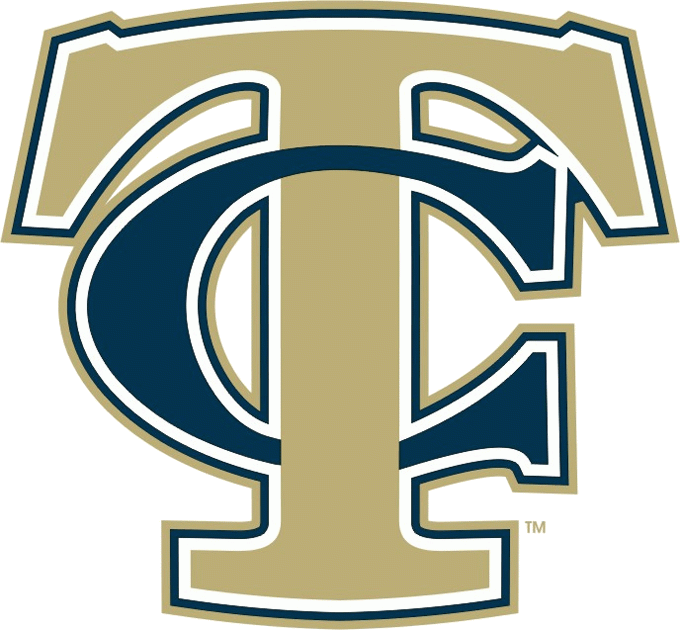
Logo

General information
- Founded: 2005
- Folded: 2016
- Headquartered: Toyota Center in Kennewick, Washington
- Colors: Navy, Vegas Gold, white
- Mascot: Clutch
- TriCitiesFever.com

Personnel
- Owner: Teri Carr
- General manager: Teri Carr
- Head coach: Ryan Lingenfelder
- President: Teri Carr

Team history
- Tri-Cities Fever (2005–2016)

Home fields
- Toyota Center (2005–2016)

League / conference affiliations
- National Indoor Football League (2005–2006): Pacific Conference (2005–2006); Western (2005); Northern (2006); AF2 (2007–2009): American (2007); National (2008–2009); West (2007–2009); Indoor Football League (2010–2016): Intense Conference (2010–2016); Pacific North (2010); Pacific (2011)

Championships
- League championships: 1; 2005
- Conference championships: 3; 2005, 2011, 2012
- Division championships: 1; 2012

Playoff appearances (7)
- 2005, 2006, 2007, 2010, 2011, 2012, 2015

The Tri-Cities Fever was a professional indoor football franchise based in Kennewick, Washington. The Fever joined National Indoor Football League (NIFL) in 2005 as an expansion team. The Fever were owned by Teri Carr. From 2005 to 2016, the Fever played their home games at the Toyota Center in Kennewick, Washington. On June 30, 2016, the team announced it would go dormant for the 2017 season and beyond.

The Fever won one division title and three conference championships. They appeared in two United Bowls, most recently the 2012 United Bowl where they were defeated by the Sioux Falls Storm 59–32.

== History ==
Original Primary Logo 2007-2015

=== National Indoor Football League (NIFL) ===
The Fever were founded and accepted into the National Indoor Football League (NIFL) September 2004. Craig Beverlin was tabbed as the team's first ever head coach. After an 0–2 start, Beverlin resigned as the head coach of the Fever, and starting quarterback Scott Mitchell quit the team. The team promoted Special Teams Coach, Dan Whitsett to head coach, and signed quarterback Doug Coleman to lead the team. The Fever rallied to a 9–5 regular season record, finishing 3rd in the Pacific West division. The Fever earned a berth in Indoor Bowl V on July 30, 2005, where they defeated the Rome Renegades 47–31 in Kennewick.

=== Move to af2 ===
After the 2006 season, the Fever announced they were leaving the NIFL. On September 4, it was confirmed that they were moving to United Indoor Football, along with the Billings Outlaws and River City Rage. The league was expected to make an official announcement at a press conference sometime on the weekend of September 11, and was also hoping to add the Rapid City Flying Aces and Wyoming Cavalry soon. However, Tri-Cities instead joined the af2 which had in-state rival Spokane.

=== New ownership, new logo ===
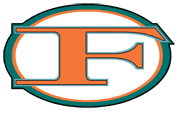
Failed logo

The new ownership had introduced a new logo, with team colors and uniforms that were reminiscent of the Miami Dolphins on December 13, 2006 (left), but because of general fan dislike, the team announced on January 9, 2007, that they would be switching back to their old color scheme and logo.

=== Back to the Carrs, on to the IFL ===
There had been speculation that the Fever would fold after the 2009 season, however, on September 6, it was announced that J. R. and Teri Carr had bought back the team from Texas af2 holdings, ensuring the Fever would return for the 2010 season. Later that month, it was announced that the af2 was shutting down and the new Arena Football 1 (AF1) was taking its place, including the Fever as a charter team. The Fever would drop out of the AF1 however on November 19 as the Tier 2 division, which the Fever were slated to be in, was scrapped by the league due to a lack of teams. So the Fever joined the Indoor Football League based in Richmond, Virginia. The Fever joined former rival (NIFL) and defending IFL champion the Billings Outlaws and new in-state rival the Kent Predators.

On June 30, 2016, after seven years in the IFL, the Fever announced the franchise would go into dormancy but remain in good standing with the IFL for the 2017 season and beyond. However, former owner Teri Carr has no intentions on bringing the team back.

== Players of note ==
=== Awards and honors ===
The following is a list of all Fever players who have won league Awards

| Season | Player | Position | Award |
|---|---|---|---|
| 2013 | Lionell Singleton | DB | Adam Pringle |
| 2015 | Steven Whitehead | WR | Offensive Player of the Year |
| 2015 | Brady Beeson | K | Adam Pringle |

=== All-IFL players ===
The following Fever players were named to All-IFL teams:

- QB Houston Lillard (2)
- RB Keithon Flemming (1), Andrew Pierce (1)
- WR Thyron Lewis (1), Joey Hew Len (1), Steven Whitehead (2)
- OL William Falakiseni (1)
- DL Jake Killeen (2)
- DB Dennis Rogan (1), Lionell Singleton (3), Rudell Crim (1). Donyae Coleman (1), Troy Sanders (1), Boubacar Cissoko (1), Dee Maggitt (1)

== Head coaches ==
Craig Beverlin was the initial head coach for the Fever, but after a 0–2 start, Beverlin was fired, and the details of his dismissal were never shared publicly. Beverlin was replaced by Special Teams coach, Dan Whitsett. On July 8, 2006, Whitsett resigned from his coaching position, just days before the Fever were to start the playoffs. On April 26, 2009 Head coach Richard Davis was fired after an 0–5 start to the season. On April 27, Pat O'Hara, Head coach of the Arena Football League's Los Angeles Avengers was named Head coach of the Fever while the AFL was suspended. O'Hara was going to remain Fever coach for the 2010 season in the IFL until he was offered head coaching job of the Orlando Predators of the af1. He was replaced by former Spokane Shock head coach Adam Shackleford. Shackleford coached the Fever to a record 50 wins in 6 seasons as the head coach. On September 1, 2015, the Fever hired Ryan Lingenfelder as their next head coach.

| Name | Term | Regular season | | | | Playoffs | | Awards |
| Name | Term | W | L | T | Win% | W | L | Awards |
|---|---|---|---|---|---|---|---|---|
| Craig Beverlin | 2005 | 0 | 2 | 0 | .000 | 0 | 0 | |
| Dan Whitsett | 2005–2006 | 18 | 8 | 0 | .692 | 4 | 0 | |
| Ed Simmons | 2006 | 0 | 0 | 0 | – | 1 | 1 | |
| Tony Wells | 2007 | 8 | 8 | 0 | .500 | 0 | 1 | |
| Cedric Walker | 2008 | 4 | 12 | 0 | .250 | 0 | 0 | |
| Richard Davis | 2009 | 0 | 5 | 0 | .000 | 0 | 0 | |
| Pat O'Hara | 2009 | 3 | 8 | 0 | .273 | 0 | 0 | |
| Adam Shackleford | 2010–2015 | 50 | 33 | 0 | .602 | 5 | 4 | |
| Ryan Lingenfelder | 2016 | 3 | 13 | 0 | .188 | 0 | 0 | |

== Season-by-season results ==
| League champions | Conference champions | Division champions | Wild card berth | League leader |

| Season | Team | League | Conference | Division | Regular season | | | | Postseason results |
| Season | Team | League | Conference | Division | Finish | Wins | Losses | Ties | Postseason results |
|---|---|---|---|---|---|---|---|---|---|
| 2005 | 2005 | NIFL | Pacific | Western | 3rd | 9 | 5 | 0 | Won Wildcard (Wyoming) 35–31; Won Pacific Conference Semifinals (Everett) 55–53; Won Pacific Conference Championship (Odessa) 41–39; Won Indoor Bowl V (Rome) 47–31 |
| 2006 | 2006 | NIFL | Pacific | Northern | 2nd | 9 | 5 | 0 | Won Wildcard (Wyoming) 45–20; Lost Pacific Conference Semifinals (Billings) 21–48 |
| 2007 | 2007 | AF2 | American | West | 3rd | 8 | 8 | 0 | Lost First Round (Wilkes-Barre/Scranton) 54–57 |
| 2008 | 2008 | AF2 | National | West | 5th | 4 | 12 | 0 | |
| 2009 | 2009 | AF2 | National | West | 5th | 3 | 13 | 0 | |
| 2010 | 2010 | IFL | Intense | Pacific North | 3rd | 7 | 7 | 0 | Lost First Round (Billings) 45–54 |
| 2011 | 2011 | IFL | Intense | Pacific | 2nd | 10 | 4 | 0 | Won First Round (West Texas) 61–49; Won Intense Conference Semifinals (Colorado) 45–42; Won Intense Conference Championship (Allen) 67–46; Lost 2011 United Bowl (Sioux Falls) 10–37 |
| 2012 | 2012 | IFL | Intense | | 1st | 12 | 2 | 0 | Won Intense Conference Semifinals (Colorado) 52–42; Won Intense Conference Championship (Wichita) 51–30; Lost 2012 United Bowl (Sioux Falls) 32–59 |
| 2013 | 2013 | IFL | Intense | | 3rd | 6 | 8 | 0 | |
| 2014 | 2014 | IFL | Intense | | 3rd | 8 | 6 | 0 | |
| 2015 | 2015 | IFL | Intense | | 2nd | 8 | 6 | 0 | Lost Intense Conference Championship (Nebraska) 43–86 |
| 2016 | 2016 | IFL | Intense | | 5th | 3 | 13 | 0 | |
| Totals | | | | | | 87 | 89 | 0 | All-time regular season record (2005–2016) |
| Totals | | | | | | 10 | 6 | — | All-time postseason record (2005–2016) |
| Totals | | | | | | 97 | 95 | 0 | All-time regular season and postseason record (2005–2016) |

== Media coverage ==
Previously 106.5 FM Eagle was the home of the Fever. Currently 610 KONA is the home of game broadcasts and a weekly Fever talk. The Fever have had a few games shown on local television channels, all home games of the 2011 season are viewed on a local FOX channel the following Thursday.
