= Ford Wyoming Center =

Multipurpose arena in Casper, Wyoming

Coordinates: 42.868274°N 106.33284°W

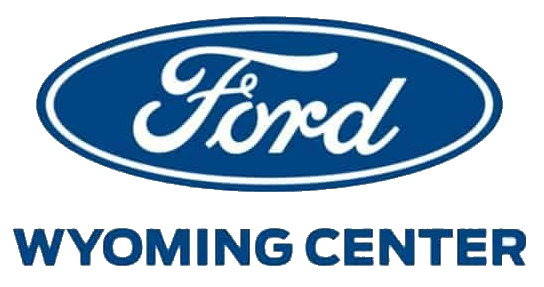
- Interactive map of Ford Wyoming Center
- Former names: Casper Events Center (1982–2021)
- Location: 1 Events Drive; Casper, Wyoming 82601
- Owner: City of Casper, WY
- Operator: OVG360
- Capacity: 8,395 (Ice hockey and Indoor football); 8,842 (Basketball); 9,700 (Concerts)

Construction
- Opened: April 1982
- Cost: $22 million

Tenants
- Wyoming Wildcatters (CBA) (1982–1988); Casper/Wyoming Cavalry (IFL/NIFL/AIFA/IFL) (2000–2014)

Website
- fordwyomingcenter.com

The Ford Wyoming Center (formerly known as the Casper Events Center) is a multi-purpose arena in Casper, Wyoming, in the United States. The arena was built in April 1982. It seats 8,395 for ice hockey and indoor football games, 8,842 for basketball games, and up to 9,700 for concerts.

The first major artist to perform in the venue was Black Sabbath on May 5, 1982. Since that time many major artists have performed there from every genre of music.

It serves as the host of the College National Finals Rodeo in June and is also currently the home of Broadway in Casper theatre series. It has also hosted amateur wrestling tournaments and UFC 6.

It was home to the Wyoming Cavalry arena football team until 2014, and the Wyoming Wildcatters of the Continental Basketball Association.

On January 7, 2021, it was announced that the Wyoming Ford dealerships had purchased the naming rights to the arena for up to six years.

Events and tenants
Preceded by Independence Arena	Ultimate Fighting Championship venue UFC 6	Succeeded by Buffalo Memorial Auditorium
