= Sioux Falls Arena =

Multi-purpose arena in Sioux Falls, South Dakota

Coordinates: 43°33′43.49″N 96°44′57.60″W

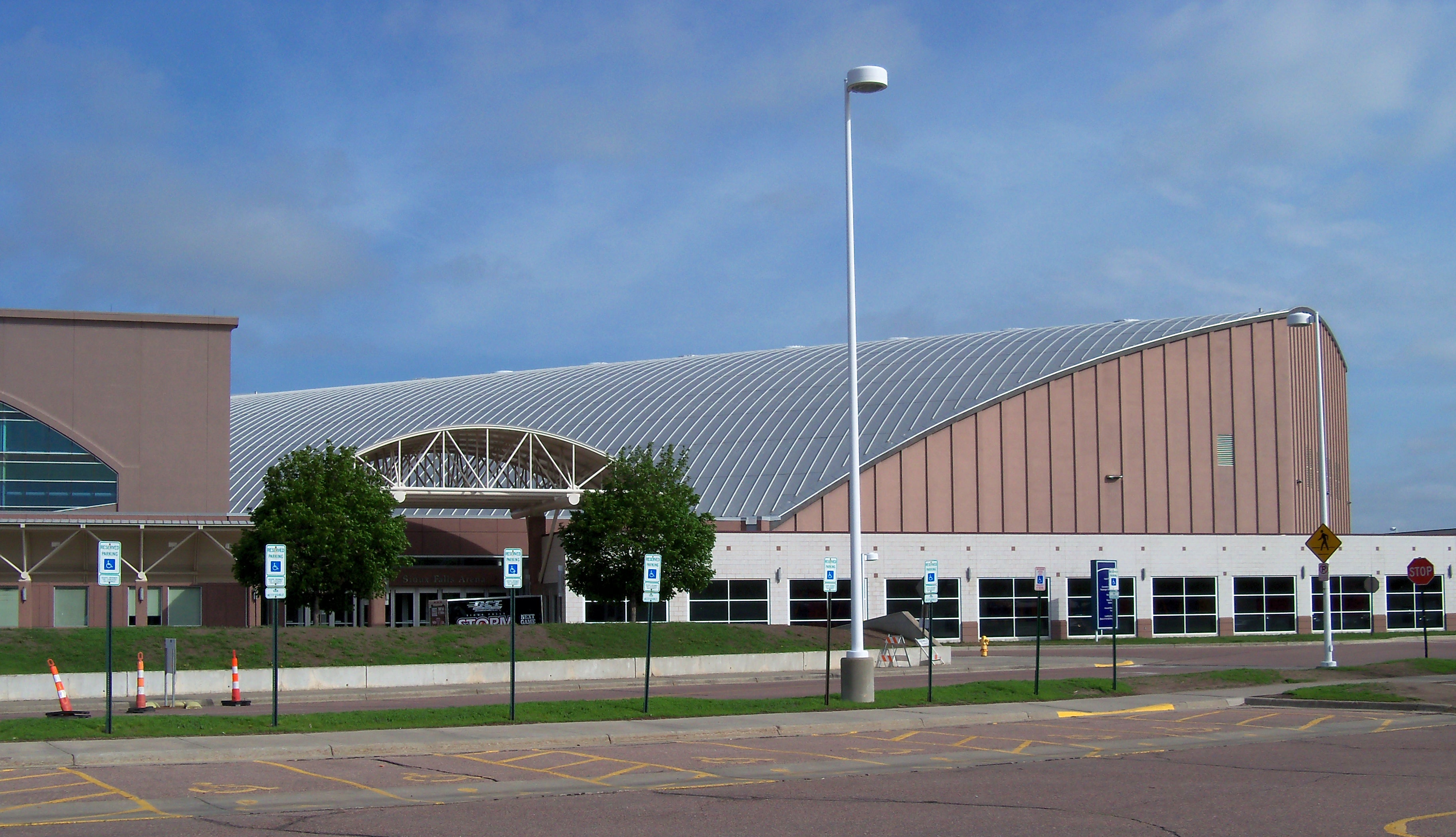
- Interactive map of Sioux Falls Arena
- Location: 1201 North West Avenue; Sioux Falls, South Dakota 57104
- Owner: City of Sioux Falls
- Operator: ASM Global
- Capacity: Basketball: 6,113; Hockey: 4,760
- Surface: Multi-surface

Construction
- Groundbreaking: 1959
- Opened: 1961
- Cost: $1,480,000 ($15.9 million in 2025 dollars)
- Architects: Spitznagel and Associates

Tenants
- Sioux Falls Skyforce (CBA/IBL/NBA D-League) (1989–2013); Sioux Falls Stampede (USHL) (1999–2014); Sioux Falls Storm (NIFL/UIF/IFL) (2001–2014); Augustana Vikings (NSIC) (2014–present)

Sioux Falls Arena is a 7,500-seat multi-purpose arena located in Sioux Falls, South Dakota. The facility was built in 1961. It seats 6,113 for basketball games and 4,760 for indoor football and hockey.

It was the home of the Sioux Falls Skyforce basketball team (1989–2013), the Sioux Falls Storm indoor football team, and the Sioux Falls Stampede ice hockey team, as well as a variety of state high school championship events.

The Sioux Falls Arena hosted the men's and women's Summit League Basketball Championship from 2009 until the opening of the Denny Sanford PREMIER Center in 2014.

Beginning in the fall of 2014, the Arena has been the home of Augustana University Vikings men's and women's basketball games.

Elvis Presley performed one of his final concerts here on June 22, 1977.
