= 2009 Colorado Ice season =

Indoor Football League team season

- Owner: Danny DeGrande
- Head coach: Collins Sanders
- Home stadium: Budweiser Events Center

Results
- Record: 5–9
- Division place: 3rd Pacific
- Playoffs: Lost Wild Card 14–42 (Grizzlies)

The 2009 Colorado Ice season was the team's third season as a professional indoor football franchise and first in the Indoor Football League (IFL). One of nineteen teams that competed in the IFL in the 2009 season, the Fort Collins-based Colorado Ice were members of the Intense Conference.

Founded in 2007 as part of United Indoor Football, the Colorado Ice became charter members of the IFL when the UIF merged with the Intense Football League before the 2009 season. In their third season under head coach Collins Sanders, the team played their home games at the Budweiser Events Center in Loveland, Colorado.

== Schedule ==
Key: Win Tie Loss Bye

=== Regular season ===
All start times are local time

Week	Day	Date	Opponent	Results		Location
Week	Day	Date	Opponent	Score	Record	Location
1	BYE					
2	BYE					
3	Saturday	March 28	Billings Outlaws	L 41–45	0–1	Budweiser Events Center
4	Saturday	April 4	at San Angelo Stampede Express	L 47–48	0–2	Foster Communications Coliseum
5	Saturday	April 11	Bloomington Extreme	W 44–26	1–2	Budweiser Events Center
6	Saturday	April 18	Fairbanks Grizzlies	W 61–30	2–2	Budweiser Events Center
7	Sunday	April 26	at Alaska Wild	W 38–19	3–2	Sullivan Arena
8	Saturday	May 2	Omaha Beef	L 68–70	3–3	Budweiser Events Center
9	Saturday	May 9	Fairbanks Grizzlies	L 36–50	3–4	Budweiser Events Center
10	Saturday	May 16	at Sioux City Bandits	L 34–64	3–5	Tyson Events Center
11	Friday	May 22	at Omaha Beef	L 42–55	3–6	Omaha Civic Auditorium
12	Saturday	May 30	at Odessa Roughnecks	W 60–50	4–6	Ector County Coliseum
13	Saturday	June 6	Alaska Wild	W 73–38	5–6	Budweiser Events Center
14	Saturday	June 13	El Paso Generals	L 33–63	5–7	Budweiser Events Center
15	Saturday	June 20	at Billings Outlaws	L 30–83	5–8	Rimrock Auto Arena at MetraPark
16	Saturday	June 27	at El Paso Generals	L 18–51	5–9	El Paso County Coliseum
17	BYE					
18	BYE					

== Standings ==
Team	Overall			Division		
Team	Wins	Losses	Percentage	Wins	Losses	Percentage
United Conference
Atlantic Division
Maryland Maniacs	10	4	0.714	8	1	0.888
Rochester Raiders	10	4	0.714	5	3	0.625
RiverCity Rage	8	6	0.571	5	2	0.714
Saginaw Sting	3	12	0.200	3	8	0.273
Muskegon Thunder	1	13	0.071	1	11	0.083
Central Division
Omaha Beef	12	2	0.857	4	1	0.800
Bloomington Extreme	11	3	0.786	4	0	1.000
Wichita Wild	9	5	0.643	3	4	0.429
Sioux Falls Storm	6	8	0.429	2	3	0.400
Sioux City Bandits	6	9	0.400	2	7	0.222
Intense Conference
Lone Star Division
El Paso Generals	12	2	0.857	8	2	0.800
Abilene Ruff Riders	9	5	0.643	9	3	0.750
San Angelo Stampede Express	5	9	0.357	3	8	0.273
Corpus Christi Hammerheads	5	9	0.357	5	9	0.357
Odessa Roughnecks	3	11	0.214	3	8	0.273
Pacific Division
Billings Outlaws	12	2	0.857	7	0	1.000
Fairbanks Grizzlies	7	7	0.500	5	4	0.555
Colorado Ice	5	9	0.357	3	2	0.600
Alaska Wild	0	14	0.000	0	8	0.000

- Green indicates clinched playoff berth
- Purple indicates division champion

=== Postseason ===
Week	Day	Date	Opponent	Results		Location
Week	Day	Date	Opponent	Final score	Record	Location
Wild Card	Sunday	July 19	Fairbanks Grizzlies	L 14–42	0–1	Budweiser Events Center
