= Eric McCain =

NJCAA Hall of Fame wide an American gridiron football player (born 1986)

Profile
- Position: Wide receiver

Personal information
- Born: January 23, 1986 (age 40); Flagstaff, Arizona
- Listed height: 6 ft 6 in (1.98 m)
- Listed weight: 210 lb (95 kg)

Career information
- College: Glendale C.C.
- NFL draft: 2007: undrafted

Career history
- Quad City Steamwheelers (2008); BC Lions (2009)*; Billings Outlaws (2009–2010); Utah Blaze (2010)*; Toronto Argonauts (2011)*; Cedar Rapids Titans (2012); Sioux Falls Storm (2013); Harrisburg Stampede (2014)*; Billings Wolves (2014)*
- * Offseason or practice squad member only

Awards and highlights
- 2003 All-State Wr ( Arizona ); 2x All-WSFL First Team; 2x All-Region 1 (ACCAC ); 2005 NJCAA Pre-Season All-American; 2005 NJCAA All-American; 2005 NJCAA National Championship MVP; United Bowl champion (2009)

Eric McCain (born January 23, 1986) is a former professional gridiron football wide receiver. He was signed by the Quad City Steamwheelers as a street free agent in 2008. He played college football for the Glendale Community College.

McCain was also a member of the BC Lions and the Toronto Argonauts of the Canadian Football League.

In 2025 McCain was inducted into the NJCAA Football Hall of Fame with his 2005 Undefeated Glendale Community College teammates. making McCain an official member of the NJCAA Hall of Fame.

== Early life ==
Eric McCain was born on January 23, 1986, in Flagstaff, Arizona. McCain started playing football at the age of five years, in Pop Warner Football. McCain attended Coconino High School, where he starred in Basketball and Football. In McCain's senior season at Coconino High School, He lettered in football and helped lead the 2003 Coconino Panthers Football team to a Div 4-A Playoff Berth and earned 2003 Grand Canyon All-Region and All-State Wide Receiver honors.

== College career ==
McCain signed a letter of intent to play with the Glendale Community College Gauchos, in Glendale, Arizona, in 2004. As a true freshman, McCain started 6 games and earned ALL WSFL First Team Wide Receiver Honors.

Prior to the start of the 2005 season, McCain was named to the 2005 NJCAA Pre-Season All American Team. In his sophomore season, McCain started all 11 games and had 49 catches for 933 yards and 11 touchdowns. McCain helped lead the undefeated Gauchos to a 2005 NJCAA National Football Championship, where he was voted the 2005 NJCAA National Championship MVP, and named the best receiver in Glendale Community College history by NJCAA Hall of Fame Head Coach Joe Kersting. In the Valley of the Sun Bowl, McCain had six catches for 177 yards and one touchdown.

McCain redshirted in 2006 for academic issues.

== Professional career ==
=== Quad City Steamwheelers ===
After going undrafted in the 2007 NFL Supplemental draft, McCain signed with the Quad City Steamwheelers in March 2008.

=== BC Lions ===
McCain signed with the BC Lions on September 30, 2008. He was released on May 13, 2009.

=== Billings Outlaws ===
In June 2009, McCain signed with the Billings Outlaws of the Indoor Football League. McCain made an immediate impact in his debut catching five passes for 33 yards, including a spectacular nine yard touchdown late in the first quarter against the Sioux Fall Storm at Rim Rock Arena in Billings, Montana. Head coach, Heron O'Neal of the Billing Outlaws later stated "He looked good. Very good considering he was only here five days and had to learn our offense that quick" said O'Neal. "He's a playmaker. He's 6'6", he runs a 4.4 (in the 40 yard dash) and he has great hands."McCain helped the Outlaws capture the first ever Indoor Football League Championship, where he had 4 catches for 46 yards and two touchdowns. Standout Outlaw receiver James Walton described McCain as a "phenomenal rookie" in an interview with the Billings Gazette. In seven games, McCain had six receiving touchdowns.

=== Seattle Seahawks ===
In April 2010 McCain attended Rookie Mini Camp with the Seahawks, But was not offered a contract.

=== Utah Blaze ===
On October 5, 2010, McCain signed with the Utah Blaze of the Arena Football League. Upon signing with the Toronto Argonauts of the Canadian Football League on January 24, 2011, the Blaze placed him on the "Other League Exempted" list two days later.

=== Toronto Argonauts ===
On January 24, 2011, McCain signed with the Toronto Argonauts of the Canadian Football League. He was released on June 1, 2011. Due to issues with his passport

=== Cedar Rapids Titans ===
In March 2012, McCain signed with the Cedar Rapids Titans of the Indoor Football League.

=== Sioux Falls Storm ===
On March 15, 2013, McCain signed with the Sioux Falls Storm of the Indoor Football League.

=== Harrisburg Stampede ===
On December 4, 2013, McCain signed with the Harrisburg Stampede of the Professional Indoor Football League.

=== Billings Wolves ===
On August 19, 2014, McCain signed with the Billings Wolves of the Indoor Football League.
