= Travonti Johnson =

American football player (born 1984)

No. 2, 7, 20, 10, 36
- Position: Safety

Personal information
- Born: May 9, 1984 (age 42); Miami, Florida, U.S.
- Listed height: 6 ft 2 in (1.88 m)
- Listed weight: 190 lb (86 kg)

Career information
- High school: Krop (Miami)
- College: UCF
- NFL draft: 2007: undrafted

Career history
- New York Giants (2007)*; Billings Outlaws (2008–2009); New York Giants (2008–2009)*; Billings Outlaws (2010); Omaha Beef (2011); Iowa Barnstormers (2011); Allen Wranglers (2012); Nebraska Danger (2013); Cedar Rapids Titans (2013–2014); Billings Wolves (2015); River City Raiders (2016); Billings Wolves (2016); Dodge City Law (2017); Monterrey Steel (2017); Salina Liberty (2018); Texas Revolution (2018); Cedar Rapids River Kings (2019)
- * Offseason or practice squad member only

Awards and highlights
- IFL Defensive Rookie of the Year (2008); United Bowl champion (2010); Second-team All-IFL (2015)

Career AFL statistics
- Total tackles: 14
- Forced fumbles: 1
- Fumble recoveries: 2
- Pass deflections: 2
- Interceptions: 1
- Stats at ArenaFan.com

Travonti Johnson (born May 9, 1984) is an American former professional football safety. He was signed by the New York Giants as an undrafted free agent in 2007. He played college football at UCF.

== Early life ==
Johnson attended Dr. Michael M. Krop High School in Miami, Florida.

== College career ==
Johnson attended the University of Central Florida, where he was a member of the UCF Knights football team.

== Professional career ==
After going undrafted in the 2007 NFL draft, Johnson signed as an undrafted free agent with the New York Giants.

Johnson was also a member of the Billings Outlaws with whom he spent the 2008 and 2009 seasons, before he re-signed with the Giants.

After spending the entire 2009 season on the Giants practice squad, Johnson returned to the Outlaws.

On June 13, 2016, Johnson signed with the Billings Wolves.

On January 30, 2017, Johnson signed with the Dodge City Law. Six months later on June 14, 2017, Johnson signed with the Monterrey Steel. After only a month with the Steel team, on July 25, 2017, Johnson signed with the Salina Liberty. He was released the following year on April 12, 2018. On that same day, Johnson signed with the Texas Revolution.
