= Chris Dixon (American football) =

American football player and coach (born 1981)

Cactus Shadows Falcons
- Title: Head coach

Personal information
- Born: November 15, 1981 (age 45); Oakland, California, U.S.
- Listed height: 6 ft 0 in (1.83 m)
- Listed weight: 200 lb (91 kg)

Career information
- Position: Quarterback
- High school: Richmond (Richmond, California)
- College: Contra Costa (2000–2001); Humboldt State (2002–2003)
- NFL draft: 2003: undrafted

Career history

Playing
- Oakland Vipers (2003); Eastside Hawks (2004); Black Hills Red Dogs (2005); Billings Mavericks / Outlaws (2005–2010); Sioux Falls Storm (2011–2012); Orlando Predators (2013); New Orleans VooDoo (2013); Sioux Falls Storm (2014); Tampa Bay Storm (2014); Texas Revolution (2017); Sioux Falls Storm (2019); Arizona Rattlers (2023)

Coaching
- Billings Senior (MT) (2006–2007) Coaching assistant; Billings Wolves (2015–2016) Head coach; Shepherd (MT) (2019–2020) Head coach; Arizona Rattlers (2022) Quarterbacks/running backs coach; Cactus Shadows (AZ) (2022–present) Head coach

Awards and highlights
- As a player: 6× United Bowl champion (2009–2012, 2014, 2019); 4× United Bowl MVP (2009, 2010, 2011, 2014); Indoor Bowl champion (2006); Champions Bowl champion (2017); NAFL national champion (2004); NAFL National Championship MVP (2004); NWFL champion (2004); 3× IFL Most Valuable Player (2009, 2011, 2012); 4× IFL Offensive Player of the Year (2009, 2011, 2012, 2014); UIF Most Valuable Player (2008); UIF Offensive Player of the Year (2008); NWFL Rookie of the Year (2004); 4× First-team All-IFL (2009–2012); Second-team All-IFL (2014); 2× UIF Western All-Star (2007, 2008); First-team All-NAFL (2004); First-team All-NWFL (2004); Second-team All-GNAC (2003); IFL Hall of Fame (2015); As a coach: Montana Class B – Eastern champion (2020)

Career AFL statistics
- Comp-Att: 111–182
- Passing Yards: 1,517
- TD-INT: 30–8
- Rushing Yards: 230
- Rushing TDs: 10
- Stats at ArenaFan.com

Christopher Dixon II (born November 15, 1981) is an American former professional indoor football quarterback who currently serves as the head coach for Cactus Shadows High School in Scottsdale, Arizona. He ended his long playing career with a stint for the Tampa Bay Storm of the Arena Football League (AFL) before returning to the Sioux Falls Storm near the end of their 2019 season. Dixon attended Contra Costa College for two years before attending Humboldt State University, where he was an all-conference player. Dixon was a member of the 1999 Richmond Oilers high school basketball team coached by Ken Carter, whose story was dramatized in the film Coach Carter.

After failing to be drafted, Dixon played semi-professional outdoor football before becoming an indoor football player. In 2005, he made his professional debut with the Black Hills Red Dogs, playing both quarterback and wide receiver. Upon his release, Dixon signed with the Billings Mavericks, where he would play for 5 seasons, winning 3 championships and throwing 369 touchdowns. Upon the folding of the Billings franchise, Dixon signed with the Sioux Falls Storm, where he won two championships in as many seasons. In 2012, Dixon signed with the Orlando Predators, it was the first time in Dixon's career that he played arena football instead of indoor football.

Dixon won six indoor football championships. He was the first indoor football player to throw for 500 career touchdowns. He was inducted into the Indoor Football League Hall of Fame in 2015.

== College career ==
Dixon attended Contra Costa College for two years before attending Humboldt State University for his final two years of school.

== Professional career ==
=== Oakland Vipers ===
Dixon played for the Oakland Vipers of the Golden State Amateur Football League (GSAFL) for a single season in 2003, and he held the record for the most passing yards in a single game (471) as of 2005.

=== Eastside Hawks ===
Dixon began playing indoor football when he signed with the Eastside Hawks, who at the time was playing semi-professional in the Northwest Football League (NWFL). He led the Hawks to an NWFL Championship, allowing them to enter the North American Football League (NAFL) national playoffs where they won the NAFL National Championship. Dixon won Championship Game MVP and NWFL Rookie of the Year honors.

=== Black Hills Red Dogs ===
In 2005, Dixon signed with the Black Hills Red Dogs of United Indoor Football. While with the Red Dogs, Dixon played quarterback, receiver, and defensive back, completing 59 of 114 passes for 493 yards with five touchdowns, while also having 12 receptions for 202 yards and three touchdowns. After starting the season 0–7, however, Dixon asked to be released from the team due to family affairs.

=== Billings Mavericks / Outlaws ===
Dixon quickly signed with the Billings Mavericks of the National Indoor Football League (NIFL), where he would split time with Bob Bees at quarterback during the remainder of the 2005 season. Dixon led the Outlaws to three championships (2006, 2009 & 2010) throughout his five seasons with the team.

=== Sioux Falls Storm ===
In 2012, Dixon threw his 500th career touchdown pass, when he hit James Terry with a 42-yard pass during a May 19 game against the Green Bay Blizzard. With his 500th touchdown, Dixon became the 10th player to throw for a 500th touchdown at any professional level.

=== Orlando Predators ===
Dixon has signed with the Orlando Predators of the Arena Football League for the 2013 season. Dixon was named the backup quarterback to Kyle Rowley to start the season. In the Predators first game, Dixon appeared in one play, a zone read play near the goalline, where Dixon was tackled for a 1-yard loss. Dixon didn't play again until the Predators' Week 3 game against the Philadelphia Soul. Dixon came in to replace the struggling Rowley, and completed 9 of 13 passes for 120-yards. Dixon also had 2 touchdown passes and one interception against the Soul. Dixon was released in late May.

=== New Orleans VooDoo ===
On May 30, 2013, Dixon was assigned to the New Orleans VooDoo. In Dixon's first game action with the VooDoo, he replaced starter Kurt Rocco, who was struggling against the San Antonio Talons' pass-rush. Dixon could evade defenders, running for 66 yards, and did not get sacked once. Dixon took over trailing 21–6 and led the VooDoo to a 56–53 loss after he was tripped up as he was attempting to make a pass on the final play of the game. Dixon's playing style caught the attention of many in the league. Dixon is one of the few players to ever play arena football out of the shotgun. Dixon's play helped the VooDoo fight to get back into the playoff picture for 2013.

=== Sioux Falls Storm (second stint) ===
On January 6, 2014, it was announced that Dixon would be returning to the Storm, citing his desire to graduate from Augustana College and be close to his family as his reasons for return. After the 2014 season, Dixon announced his retirement as a player.

=== Sioux Falls Storm (third stint) ===
After making it to their 17th straight playoff appearance, the Storm signed Dixon for the 2019 IFL playoffs. The Storm would go on to win the 2019 United Bowl, making it Dixon's ninth championship of his career.

=== Arizona Rattlers ===
On March 30, 2023, following quarterback Drew Powell being placed on short-term injured reserve, it was announced that Dixon was signed to the Arizona Rattlers.

== Coaching career ==
=== Billings Senior HS ===
In 2006 and 2007, Dixon coached at Billings Senior High School under head coach Mark Sulser.

=== Billings Wolves ===
In late July 2014, the Billings Wolves of the Indoor Football League announced they had signed Dixon as head coach for their upcoming inaugural season.

=== Shepherd HS ===
Before the 2019 season, Dixon was hired as the head coach of the Shepherd High School in Shepherd, Montana.

=== Cactus Shadows HS ===
In July 2022, Cactus Shadows High School in Scottsdale, Arizona announced they had selected Dixon to lead their football program. His first two seasons with the Falcons ended with a 4–6 record.

== Head coaching record ==
=== Professional ===
League	Team	Year	Regular season				Postseason			
League	Team	Year	Won	Lost	Win %	Finish	Won	Lost	Win %	Result
IFL	BIL	2015	5	9	.357	4th in Intense	0	0	–	
IFL	BIL	2016	8	8	.500	2nd in Intense	0	1	.000	Lost to Nebraska Danger in Intense Conference Wild Card Game
Total			13	17	.433		0	1	.000	

=== High school ===
Year	Team	Overall	Conference	Standing	Bowl/playoffs	
Shepherd Mustangs (Montana High School Association) (2019–2020)
2019	Shepherd	4–5	4–2	3rd (B - Eastern Region)	L MHSA Class B First Round	
2020	Shepherd	4–4	4–1	1st (B - Eastern Region)	L MHSA Class B First Round	
Shepherd:		8–9	8–3			
Cactus Shadows Falcons (Arizona Interscholastic Association) (2022–present)
2022	Cactus Shadows	4–6	1–4	4th (5A Northeast Valley Region)		
2023	Cactus Shadows	4–6	0–5	6th (5A Northeast Valley Region)		
2024	Cactus Shadows	7–5	1–4	5th (5A Northeast Valley Region)	L AIA Conference 5A First Round	10
2025	Cactus Shadows	7–5	0–0	TBD (5A Northeast Valley Region)	L AIA Second round	10
Cactus Shadows:		22-22	2–13			
Total:		30-31				
National championship Conference title Conference division title or championship game berth

== Personal life ==
Dixon's oldest son Chishon played basketball at Montana State Billings before transferring to Montana Tech. His son Donivan plays for Cactus Shadows High School as the starting quarterback.
