= Tim Brown (Canadian football) =

American gridiron football player (born 1984)

No. 2
- Positions: Running back, kick returner

Personal information
- Born: October 25, 1984 (age 42); Stockton, California, U.S.
- Listed height: 5 ft 8 in (1.73 m)
- Listed weight: 190 lb (86 kg)

Career information
- College: Temple

Career history
- 2008: Sioux City Bandits
- 2008–2010: Billings Outlaws
- 2011–2014: BC Lions
- 2015: Calgary Stampeders*
- * Offseason or practice squad member only

Awards and highlights
- 2× United Bowl champion (2009, 2010); Grey Cup champion (2011); CFL West All-Star (2012); John Agro Special Teams Award runner up (2012)
- Stats at CFL.ca (archive)

Timothy Brown (born October 25, 1984) is an American former professional football player who was a running back and kick returner in the Canadian Football League (CFL). He signed with the BC Lions in 2011 and won his first Grey Cup championship that same season. In 2012, he was named a West Division All-Star and the West Division's Most Outstanding Special Teams Player. Brown played for four years with the Lions before he was released. He also played one year with the Calgary Stampeders. He played college football for the Temple Owls.

== Professional career ==
Pre-draft measurables
Height	Weight	40-yard dash	10-yard split	20-yard split	20-yard shuttle	Three-cone drill	Vertical jump	Broad jump	Bench press
5 ft 6 1/8 in (1.68 m)	191 lb (87 kg)	4.78 s	1.58 s	2.76 s	4.42 s	7.11 s	25.5 in (0.65 m)	8 ft 11 in (2.72 m)	16 reps
All values from Pro Day

=== Billings Outlaws ===
After going undrafted, Brown signed with the Sioux City Bandits in 2008. He would later be traded to the Billings Outlaws. He played for three seasons with the Outlaws, winning two Indoor Football League championships in 2009 and 2010.

=== BC Lions ===
Brown originally signed as a free agent with the BC Lions on May 17, 2011. Brown was named a West Division all-star at the end of 2012 season, and was second in the CFL with 2,687 all-purpose yards, which included 2,382 kick return yards (ninth-highest total in CFL history), 914 punt return yards (second most in the CFL in 2012), third in kickoff return yards (1,303) and fourth in missed field goal return yards (165). Brown's single-season all-purpose yards was also the second-highest total in franchise history, after Ian Smart's 2,744 yards in 2008.

In December 2012, he signed a one-year contract extension. In total, Brown played in 52 regular season games for the Lions with 3,987 kick return yards and a kick return touchdown and 2,404 punt return yards and four punt return touchdowns. After four seasons with the team, he was released by the Lions on May 25, 2015.

=== Calgary Stampeders ===
On June 16, 2015, Brown signed with the Calgary Stampeders. He played with the team for one year before being released on January 12, 2016.
