= 2005 National Indoor Football League season =

2005 NIFL season
- League: National Indoor Football League
- Sport: indoor American football

Regular season
- Season champions: Odessa Roughnecks

Playoffs
- Atlantic champions: Rome Renegades
- Atlantic runners-up: Cincinnati Marshals
- Pacific champions: Tri-Cities Fever
- Pacific runners-up: Odessa Roughnecks

Indoor Bowl V
- Champions: Tri-Cities Fever
- Runners-up: Rome Renegades

NIFL seasons
- ← 2004 2006 →

The 2005 National Indoor Football League season was the fifth season of the National Indoor Football League (NIFL). The league champions were the Tri-Cities Fever, who defeated the Rome Renegades in Indoor Bowl V.

== Standings ==
Team	Overall			Conference		
Team	Wins	Losses	Percentage	Wins	Losses	Percentage
Atlantic Conference
Eastern Division
RiverCity Rage	10	4	0.714	5	1	0.833
Cincinnati Marshals	7	6	0.538	2	4	0.333
Dayton Warbirds	7	6	0.538	4	2	0.667
New Jersey XTreme	0	14	0.000	0	5	0.000
Southern Division
Daytona Beach Hawgs*	8	6	0.571	9	2	0.818
Miami Morays	7	7	0.500	4	3	0.571
Lakeland Thunderbolts	5	8	0.385	4	5	0.444
Kissimmee Kreatures	2	12	0.143	3	6	0.333
Central Division
Montgomery Maulers	8	6	0.571	2	2	0.500
Rome Renegades	7	7	0.500	3	1	0.750
Fayetteville Guard	7	7	0.500	1	4	0.250
Pacific Conference
Northern Division
Odessa Roughnecks	14	0	1.000	4	0	1.000
Lubbock Gunslingers	4	10	0.286	1	3	0.250
San Angelo Stampede	3	11	0.214	1	3	0.250
Western Division
Everett Hawks	14	0	1.000	9	0	1.000
Wyoming Cavalry	10	4	0.714	6	4	0.600
Tri-Cities Fever	9	5	0.643	4	4	0.500
Billings Mavericks	4	9	0.308	3	6	0.333
Lincoln Capitols	0	12	0.000	0	8	0.000
Southern Division
Southwest Louisiana Swashbucklers	10	4	0.715	6	4	1.000
Corpus Christi Hammerheads	8	6	0.571	2	2	0.500
Beaumont Drillers	5	9	0.357	0	4	0.000

- Green indicates clinched playoff berth
- Purple indicates division champion
- Grey indicates best conference record

*= Despite winning the division, the D.B. Hawgs were unable to play in the playoffs for using an illegal player in a game against the Rome Renegades.

== Playoffs ==
Conference Quarterfinals	Conference Semifinals
5	Fayetteville	78
4	Dayton	63
5	Fayetteville	69
3	Cincinnati	70
3	Cincinnati	67
1	RiverCity	64
Atlantic Conference
8	Lakeland	7
6	Rome	53
6	Rome	35
2	Montgomery	28
7	Miami	35
2	Montgomery	65
8	Billings	60
1	Everett	97
1	Everett	53
5	Tri-Cities	54
5	Tri-Cities	35
4	Wyoming	31
Pacific Conference
7	Beaumont	23
2	Odessa	74
2	Odessa	69
6	Corpus Christi	28
6	Corpus Christi	31
3	Southwest Louisiana	29

Conference Championships
3	Cincinnati	41
6	Rome	51
5	Tri-Cities	41
2	Odessa	39

Indoor Bowl V
A6	Rome	31
P5	Tri-Cities	47

=== Semifinals ===
Atlantic Conference

- Rome 51, 3-Cincinnati 41

Pacific Conference

- Tri-Cities 41, Odessa 39

=== Indoor Bowl V ===
- Tri-Cities 47, Rome 31
