= 2009 United Bowl =

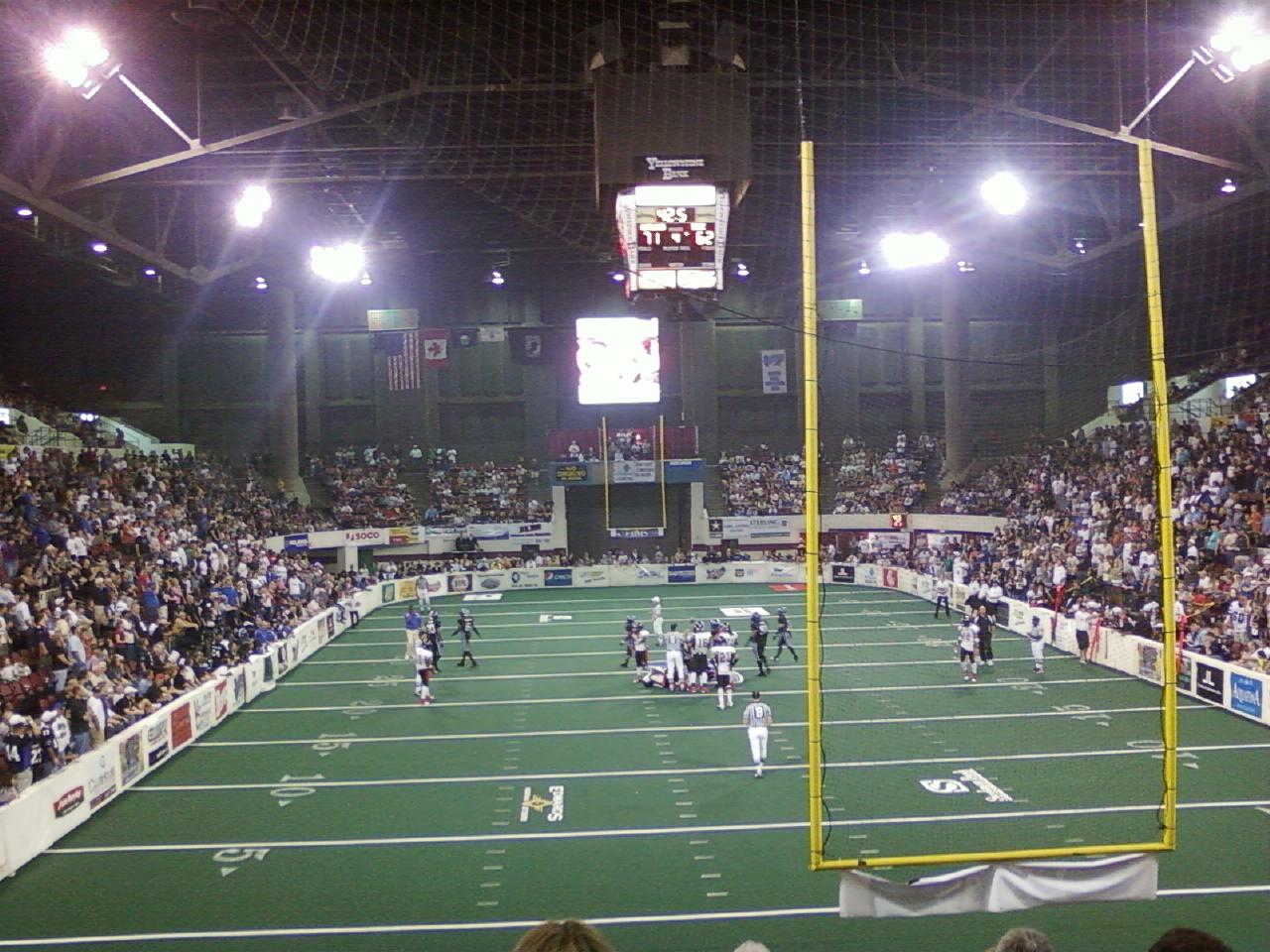
RiverCity Rage	Billings Outlaws
(11–6)	(14–2)
United	Intense
62	71
Head coach: Michael Pimmel	Head coach: Heron O'Neal
	1	2	3	4	Total
RiverCity	7	13	28	14	62
Billings	20	14	21	16	71
- Date: August 15, 2009
- Stadium: Rimrock Auto Arena at MetraPark
- Location: Billings, Montana, U.S.
- MVP: Billings QB Chris Dixon
- Referee: Russel Gray
- Attendance: 8,351

The 2009 United Bowl was the inaugural title game of the Indoor Football League (IFL). It was played on August 15, 2009, at the Rimrock Auto Arena at MetraPark in Billings, Montana. The top seed in the Intense Conference (Billings Outlaws) defeated the six-seed RiverCity Rage of the United Conference by a score of 71–62.

== Road to the United Bowl ==
=== United Conference ===
Atlantic
Team	W	L	PCT
x-Maryland Maniacs	10	4	.714
y-Rochester Raiders	9	5	.643
y-RiverCity Rage	8	6	.571
Saginaw Sting	3	11	.214
Muskegon Thunder	1	13	.071
Central
Team	W	L	PCT
z-Omaha Beef	11	3	.786
y-Bloomington Extreme	10	4	.714
y-Wichita Wild	8	6	.571
Sioux Falls Storm	6	8	.429
Sioux City Bandits	4	10	.286

=== Intense Conference ===
Lone Star
Team	W	L	PCT
x-El Paso Generals	12	2	.857
y-Abilene Ruff Riders	8	6	.571
y-San Angelo Stampede Express	5	9	.357
Corpus Christi Hammerheads	5	9	.357
Odessa Roughnecks	3	11	.214
Pacific
Team	W	L	PCT
z-Billings Outlaws	12	2	.857
y-Fairbanks Grizzlies	7	7	.500
y-Colorado Ice	5	9	.357
Alaska Wild	0	14	.000

z=clinched top seed in conference, x=clinched division, y=clinched wild card spot

Wild Card	Division Championships
3	San Angelo	37
2	El Paso	75
6	San Angelo	37
3	Abilene	34
Intense Conference
5	Colorado	14
4	Fairbanks	42
2	Fairbanks	7
1	Billings	50
5	RiverCity	55
2	Maryland	31
5	RiverCity	45
4	Rochester	42
United Conference
6	Wichita	46
3	Bloomington	37
6	Wichita	39
1	Omaha	34

Conference Championships
2	El Paso	35
1	Billings	66
5	RiverCity	43
6	Wichita	30

2009 United Bowl
I1	Billings	71
U5	RiverCity	62

== Game summary ==
The 2009 United Bowl was a highly anticipated event in both Billings and the Greater St. Louis area, as the Billings Outlaws hosted the RiverCity Rage in what would end up being the franchise's final game. RiverCity fell behind Billings quickly, as the score was 20-7 heading into the second quarter and was 34-20 at halftime. The pace stayed pretty much the same throughout the rest of the game as the Outlaws beat the Rage, 71-62, for their third franchise title.
