= Mason Espinosa =

American football player

DePauw Tigers
- Title: Offensive coordinator & pass game coordinator

Personal information
- Listed height: 6 ft 4 in (1.93 m)
- Listed weight: 225 lb (102 kg)

Career information
- Position: Quarterback
- High school: Cookeville (TN)
- College: Ohio Wesleyan
- NFL draft: 2014: undrafted

Career history

Playing
- Erie Explosion (2015); Columbus Lions (2016); Billings Wolves (2016); Columbus Lions (2017–2018); Albany Empire (2019); Columbus Lions (2020–2021)

Coaching
- Defiance (2014–2015) Graduate assistant & quarterbacks coach; Denison (2016–2018) Wide receivers coach; Denison (2019–2021) Quarterbacks coach; Denison (2021) Interim co-offensive coordinator; Wooster HS (OH) (2021) Offensive coordinator & quarterbacks coach; DePauw (2022–present) Offensive coordinator & pass game coordinator

Awards and highlights
- ArenaBowl champion (2019); NAL Most Valuable Player (2021); First-team All-NAL (2021); Second-team All-NAL (2017)
- Stats at ArenaFan.com

Mason Espinosa is an American college football coach and former professional quarterback. He is the offensive coordinator and pass game coordinator for DePauw University, positions he has held since 2022. He has also played for the Albany Empire, the Erie Explosion and the Billings Wolves. Espinosa played college football for Ohio Wesleyan University. He currently holds 17 individual Ohio Wesleyan records, as well as being the all-time North Coast Athletic Conference (NCAC) career leader in passing yards and total yards, while also setting a single season NCAC record for completions.

He was also an assistant football coach at Granville, Ohio-based Denison University, for the 2016–17 and 2017-18 seasons.

== College career ==
Espinosa played college football at Ohio Wesleyan University. He was a 4-time all NCAC selection, and was the NCAC Player of the Year in 2012. In addition, he was named the ohiocollegefootball.com First-Team All-Ohio quarterback in 2012, and a Beyond Sports Network All-American that same year. He was the MVP of the 2013 National Bowl Game. In total, Espinosa finished as the record holder to 17 different records for Ohio Wesleyan, in addition to being the conference's all-time record holder in career passing yards (11,069), total yards (10,839), and completions (1004), ranking him statistically among the best to have played Division III football.

== Professional career ==
=== Erie Explosion ===
Espinosa signed with the Erie Explosion of the Professional Indoor Football League (PIFL) for the 2015 season. In his rookie year, he was an Honorable Mention for Rookie of the year and was the Week 9 PIFL Offensive Player of the week.

=== Columbus Lions ===
Espinosa started the 2016 season with the Columbus Lions of American Indoor Football (AIF).

=== Billings Wolves ===
In late March 2016, Espinosa signed with the Billings Wolves of the Indoor Football League (IFL). He led the Wolves to their only playoff appearance and was the IFL's week 10 Offensive Player of the Week.

=== Columbus Lions (second stint) ===
For the 2017 season, Espinosa signed and played with the Columbus Lions of the NAL. He was voted 2nd team All-NAL and was 2-time NAL Player of the Week, while leading Columbus to the NAL championship game against the Jacksonville Sharks, where they lost 27–21. He has re-signed with the Lions for 2018.

=== Albany Empire ===
On March 5, 2019, Espinosa was assigned to the Albany Empire of the Arena Football League.

=== Columbus Lions (third stint) ===
With the AFL closing down its teams in anticipation of either closure or reformatting as a touring league, the Columbus Lions re-signed Espinosa for the 2020 season.
