= LaRoche Jackson =

American gridiron football player (born 1984)

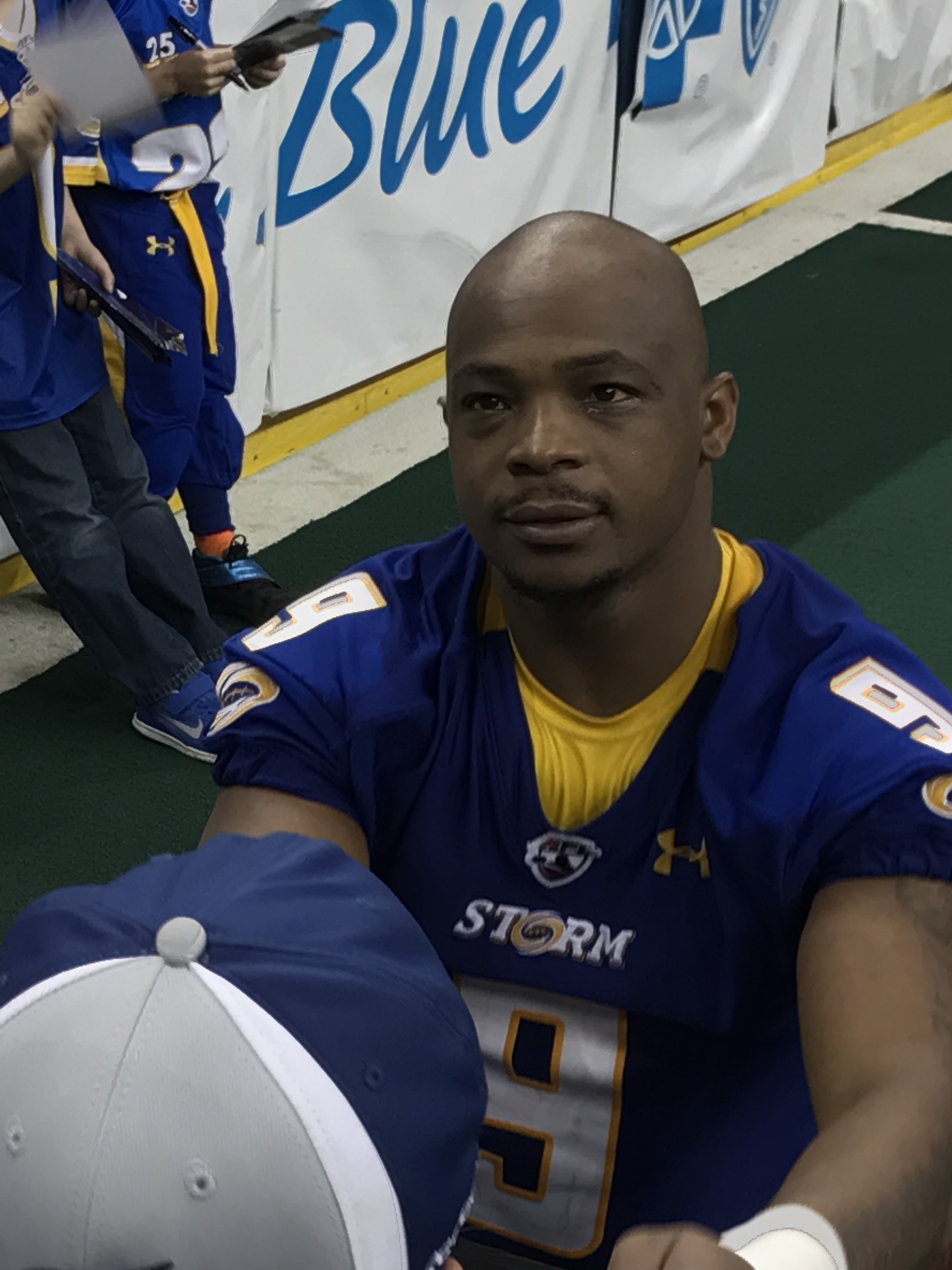
- Jackson with the Tampa Bay Storm in 2017

No. 6, 9, 4
- Position: Defensive back

Personal information
- Born: June 21, 1984 (age 42); Irwinton, Georgia, U.S.
- Listed height: 5 ft 11 in (1.80 m)
- Listed weight: 195 lb (88 kg)

Career information
- High school: Irwinton (GA) Wilkinson County
- College: Clark Atlanta
- NFL draft: 2006: undrafted

Career history
- Carolina Speed (2008); Bloomington Extreme (2009); Hamilton Tiger-Cats (2010); Jacksonville Sharks (2011–2012); Lakeland Raiders (2013); Cleveland Gladiators (2013–2014); Las Vegas Outlaws (2015)*; Jacksonville Sharks (2015–2017); Tampa Bay Storm (2017); Atlanta Havoc (2018); Atlantic City Blackjacks (2019)
- * Offseason or practice squad member only

Awards and highlights
- ArenaBowl champion (2011); AIFA Rookie of the Year (2008); First-team All-IFL (2009)

Career AFL statistics
- Tackles: 582
- Pass breakups: 67
- Forced fumbles: 7
- Fumble recoveries: 11
- Interceptions: 29
- Stats at ArenaFan.com

LaRoche J. Jackson (born June 21, 1984) is an American former football defensive back. He played as a defensive back for Clark Atlanta University. He was signed as a free agent by the Jacksonville Sharks in 2010, played for the championship Sharks team in 2011, and played for the Sharks throughout 2012. He signed with the Lakeland Raiders in 2013. On March 30, 2013, it was announced that he had signed with the Cleveland Gladiators. On April 22, 2015, Jackson returned to the Sharks. On April 27, 2017, Jackson was released by the Sharks. On May 16, 2017, Jackson was assigned to the Tampa Bay Storm. He signed with the Atlanta Havoc in December 2017. On March 5, 2019, Jackson returned to the AFL as he was assigned to the expansion Atlantic City Blackjacks.
