= Everett Hawks =

American indoor football team

Logo

General information
- Founded: 2001
- Folded: 2007
- Headquartered: Everett Events Center in Everett, Washington
- Colors: Navy blue, gold, white

Personnel
- Owner: Sam Adams
- Head coach: Rickey Foggie

Team history
- Eastside Hawks (2002–2004); Everett Hawks (2005–2007)

Home fields
- Everett Events Center (2002–2007)

League / conference affiliations
- NWFL (2002–2004) NIFL (2005): Pacific Conference (2005); Western Division (2005); af2 (2006–2007): National Conference (2006); Western Division (2006); American Conference (2007); West Division (2007)

Championships
- League championships: 2: 2003, 2004
- Division championships: 1: 2005

Playoff appearances (4)
- 2002, 2003, 2004, 2005

The Everett Hawks were a professional minor league arena football team based in Everett, Washington. The team was in existence for five years (2002–07) in three leagues, the Northwest Football League (NWFL), the National Indoor Football League (NIFL), and af2 and in two locations, the Eastside and Everett. They were first members of the Northwest Football League as the Eastside Hawks. After the 2004 season, they became a member of the NIFL as the Everett Hawks. In 2006 they switched to the af2. They played their home games at Everett Events Center.

On May 14, 2006, after losing their first six af2 games, Rickey Foggie was fired from the head coach position. The Hawks got their first win in af2 history by defeating the Stockton Lightning 41–40 on May 27, 2006. Nonetheless, soon after the end of the 2007 season, the team folded as predicted by local newspapers after many businesses involved with the Hawks were filing lawsuits to try to receive payment for services rendered.

"The Everett Hawks will not be back next year," majority owner Sam Adams said Monday via telephone from the training camp of the NFL's Denver Broncos. "I informed the league three weeks ago."

"I've been unable to devote the time it requires to make it a quality product like (Everett's other sports franchises) the Silvertips and AquaSox," Adams said. "I had bad luck in finding people that could operate the team efficiently. We failed the fans and I take responsibility for it."

== Season-by-season ==
Season records
Season	W	L	T	Finish	Playoff results
Eastside Hawks (NWFL)
2002	7	1	0	2nd League	Lost NWFL Playoffs (Multnomah County)
2003	7	2	0	3rd League	Won Semifinal (Willamette Valley); Won NWFL Championship (King County)
2004	10	0	0	1st League	Won NWFL Semifinal (Willamette Valley); Won NWFL Championship (West Sound); Won NAFL Round 1 (Central Coast); Won NAFL Round 2 (Ogden); Won NAFL Quarterfinal (St. Paul); Won NAFL Semifinal (Springfield); Won NAFL Championship (Central Penn)
Everett Hawks (NIFL)
2005	14	0	0	1st Pacific West	Won PC Quarterfinal (B. Mavericks); Lost PC Semifinal (Tri-Cities)
Everett Hawks (af2)
2006	4	12	0	5th NC West	–
2007	6	10	0	6th AC West	–
Totals	58	27	0	(including NWFL & NIFL playoffs)	

== Notable players ==
- Chris Dixon – QB
- Jeremiah Pharms – LB
- Tupo Tuupo – FB/LB
