= Bob Bees =

American football player and coach (born 1972)

Profile
- Position: Quarterback

Personal information
- Born: September 5, 1972 (age 54)
- Listed height: 6 ft 3 in (1.91 m)
- Listed weight: 220 lb (100 kg)

Career information
- High school: Cajon (San Bernardino, California)
- College: Rocky Mountain

Career history

Playing
- San Jose SaberCats (1999)*; Oklahoma Wranglers (2000); Richmond Speed (2000–2002); Billings Outlaws (2002)*; San Jose SaberCats (2003); Buffalo Destroyers (2003); Las Vegas Gladiators (2003–2004)*; Tulsa Talons (2004); Billings Mavericks (2005)
- * Offseason or practice squad member only

Coaching
- Billings Outlaws (2006) (OC); San Diego Shockwave (2007) (HC)

Career AFL statistics
- Comp. / Att.: 75 / 137
- Passing yards: 922
- TD–INT: 16–6
- Passer rating: 86.69
- Stats at ArenaFan.com

Robert Bees (born September 5, 1972) is an American former professional football quarterback who played two seasons in the Arena Football League (AFL) with the Oklahoma Wranglers, San Jose SaberCats and Buffalo Destroyers. He played college football at Rocky Mountain. He was also a member of the Richmond Speed, Billings Outlaws/Mavericks, Las Vegas Gladiators and Tulsa Talons.

== Early life and college ==
Bees attended Cajon High School in San Bernardino, California.

He redshirted a year for the Weber State Wildcats of Weber State University. He transferred and played a year for the San Bernardino Valley College Indians. He was part of two teams that went 20-1-1, and won the So. Cal. Bowl against El Camino and Potato Bowl against Bakersfield.

Bees played for the Ohio Bobcats of Ohio University in 1994. Bees made his first start for Ohio on October 22, 1994.

He played for the Rocky Mountain Battlin' Bears of Rocky Mountain College in 1996 after a year off from football. He helped Rocky Mountain open the season with a victory and the team finished 6–4. Bees recorded seven touchdown passes and a NAIA record 685 yards passing in a game against the Carroll Fighting Saints. He received first-team All-America recognition after throwing for 4,315 yards and 36 touchdowns in ten games. His 431.5 passing yards per game in 1996 set an NAIA all-time record.

== Professional career ==
Bees was a member of the San Jose SaberCats of the AFL in 1999.

Bees was selected by the AFL's Oklahoma Wranglers in the 2000 Expansion Draft. He was released by the Wranglers on May 17, 2000.

Bees played for the Richmond Speed of the af2 from 2000 to 2002. He completed 262 of 502 pass attempts for 3,579 yards and 73 touchdowns while helping the Speed to ArenaCup II. He joined Richmond midway through the 2000 season and guided team to a 7-2 record after the Speed had gone 0-7. Bees started all 34 wins in Speed history and owned a 34-13 record as Richmond's starter.

Bees was signed by the Billings Outlaws of the National Indoor Football League (NIFL) in December 2002.

Bees signed with the San Jose SaberCats on January 16, 2003. He was released by the SaberCats on April 16 and signed to the team's practice squad on April 18, 2003.

Bees was signed by the Buffalo Destroyers off the San Jose SaberCats' practice squad on April 25, 2003. He started the Destroyers' final four games of the 2003 season.

Bees was traded to the Las Vegas Gladiators on November 19, 2003. He was released by the Gladiators on January 27, 2004.

Bees played for the Tulsa Talons of the af2 in 2004. He made the National Conference All-af2 Second Team. He played first game with the Talons on May 8 against the Bossier-Shreveport Battle Wings. Since then, the Talons recorded 12 wins, 11 consecutive, and one loss. He became a member of the 200/10,000 Club for af2 with 227 touchdown passes and 11,688 yards on August 4, 2004. As of August 6, 2004, Bees was ranked second in pass rating with a 118.7 rating.

Bees was offensive coordinator and starting quarterback for the Billings Mavericks of the NIFL, helping them to the first round of the playoffs.

== Coaching career ==
Bees continued as offensive coordinator of the Billings Outlaws in 2006, helping them to a NIFL Championship win. He was head coach of the San Diego Shockwave of the National Indoor Football League in 2007.
