= 2010 United Bowl =

Sioux Falls Storm	Billings Outlaws
(14–3)	(15–2)
Intense	Intense
34	43
Head coach: Kurtiss Riggs	Head coach: Heron O'Neal
	1	2	3	4	Total
Sioux Falls	7	20	7	0	34
Billings	7	21	9	6	43
- Date: July 17, 2010
- Stadium: Billings Sports Plex
- Location: Billings, Montana, U.S.
- MVP: Billings QB Chris Dixon
- Referee: Todd Geerlings
- Attendance: 2,500

The 2010 United Bowl was the second title game of the Indoor Football League (IFL). It was played on July 17, 2010, at the Billings Sports Plex in Billings, Montana. The top seed in the Intense Conference (Billings Outlaws) defeated the United Conference's two-seed team, Sioux Falls Storm, by a score of 43–34.

== Road to the United Bowl ==
=== United Conference ===
Atlantic East
Team	W	L	PCT
z-Richmond Revolution	13	1	.929
y-Rochester Raiders	9	5	.643
West Michigan ThunderHawks	5	9	.357
Maryland Maniacs	1	13	.071
Central North
Team	W	L	PCT
x-Green Bay Blizzard	10	4	.714
y-Bloomington Extreme	9	5	.643
y-Chicago Slaughter	6	8	.429
La Crosse Spartans	3	11	.214
Central West
Team	W	L	PCT
x-Sioux Falls Storm	11	3	.786
y-Omaha Beef	9	5	.643
y-Wichita Wild	9	5	.643
Sioux City Bandits	4	10	.286
Colorado Ice	2	12	.143

=== Intense Conference ===
Lonestar East
Team	W	L	PCT
x-Arkansas Diamonds	11	3	.786
y-San Angelo Stampede Express	10	4	.714
y-Corpus Christi Hammerheads	6	8	.429
Austin Turfcats	2	12	.143
Lonestar West
Team	W	L	PCT
x-Amarillo Venom	11	3	.786
y-West Texas Roughnecks	7	7	.500
Abilene Ruff Riders	2	12	.143
Pacific North
Team	W	L	PCT
z-Billings Outlaws	12	2	.857
y-Fairbanks Grizzlies	9	5	.643
y-Tri-Cities Fever	7	7	.500
Kent Predators	5	9	.357
Alaska Wild	2	12	.143

=== Playoffs ===
z=clinched top seed in conference, x=clinched division, y=clinched wild card spot

Conference Quarterfinals	Conference Semifinals
6	Rochester	26
1	Richmond	24
6	Rochester	33
4	Wichita	45
7	Bloomington	48
4	Wichita	61
United Conference
8	Chicago	46
3	Green Bay	39
8	Chicago	33
2	Sioux Falls	47
5	Omaha	23
2	Sioux Falls	42
8	Corpus Christi	29
3	Arkansas	44
3	Arkansas	46
2	Amarillo	31
7	West Texas	36
2	Amarillo	56
Intense Conference
5	Fairbanks	35
4	San Angelo	45
4	San Angelo	39
1	Billings	68
6	Tri-Cities	45
1	Billings	54

Conference Championships
4	Wichita	34
2	Sioux Falls	52
3	Arkansas	42
1	Billings	53

2010 United Bowl
U2	Sioux Falls	34
I1	Billings	43
