= Shepherd, Montana =

- CDP
- Location of Shepherd, Montana
- Coordinates: 45°56′49″N 108°20′47″W
- Country: United States
- State: Montana
- County: Yellowstone

Area
  - Total: 2.22 sq mi (5.76 km^{2})
  - Land: 2.22 sq mi (5.76 km^{2})
  - Water: 0 sq mi (0.00 km^{2})
- Elevation: 3,110 ft (950 m)

Population (2020)
  - Total: 507
  - Density: 228.0/sq mi (88.03/km^{2})
- Time zone: UTC-7 (Mountain (MST))
  - Summer (DST): UTC-6 (MDT)
- ZIP code: 59079
- Area code: 406
- FIPS code: 30-67525
- GNIS feature ID: 2408725

Shepherd is a census-designated place (CDP) in Yellowstone County, Montana, United States. As of the 2020 census, Shepherd had a population of 507. Shepherd is a Billings suburb located to the northeast. The unincorporated town was named after R.E. Shepherd, a prominent early settler and owner of the Billings Land and Irrigation Company and the Merchants National Bank. The post office opened in 1915.

The farming community is near the Yellowstone River.

== Geography ==
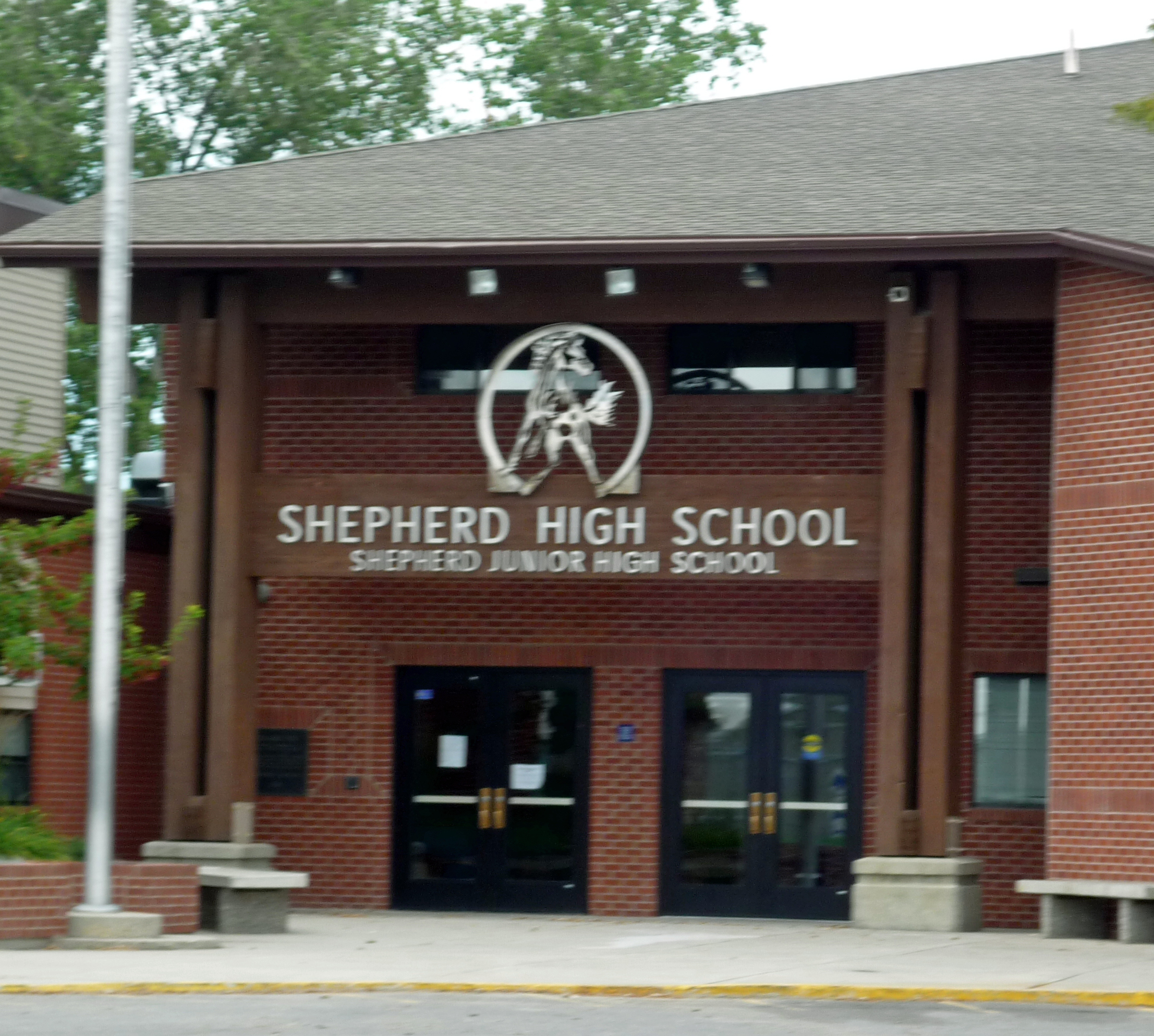
Shepherd High School

According to the United States Census Bureau, the CDP has a total area of 1.1 square miles (2.8 km^{2}), all land.

== Demographics ==
Historical population
Census	Pop.	Note	%±
2020	507		—
U.S. Decennial Census

As of the census of 2000, there were 193 people, 71 households, and 51 families residing in the CDP. The population density was 181.0 inhabitants per square mile (69.9/km^{2}). There were 79 housing units at an average density of 74.1 per square mile (28.6/km^{2}). The racial makeup of the CDP was 94.30% White, 4.15% Native American, and 1.55% from two or more races. Hispanic or Latino of any race were 0.52% of the population.

There were 71 households, out of which 39.4% had children under the age of 18 living with them, 54.9% were married couples living together, 15.5% had a female householder with no husband present, and 26.8% were non-families. 23.9% of all households were made up of individuals, and 4.2% had someone living alone who was 65 years of age or older. The average household size was 2.72 and the average family size was 3.23.

In the CDP, the population was spread out, with 33.7% under the age of 18, 6.2% from 18 to 24, 29.5% from 25 to 44, 22.3% from 45 to 64, and 8.3% who were 65 years of age or older. The median age was 30 years. For every 100 females, there were 112.1 males. For every 100 females age 18 and over, there were 96.9 males.

The median income for a household in the CDP was $31,250, and the median income for a family was $45,500. Males had a median income of $17,500 versus $21,250 for females. The per capita income for the CDP was $13,025. About 31.0% of families and 28.2% of the population were below the poverty line, including 53.7% of those under the age of eighteen and 50.0% of those 65 or over.

== Education ==
The school districts are Shepherd Elementary School District and Shepherd High School District.

Shepherd School District (a combination of the elementary and high school districts) educates students from kindergarten through 12th grade. Shepherd High School's team name is the Mustangs.
