= Billings Wolves =

Indoor football team in Montana, US

Logo

General information
- Founded: 2014
- Folded: 2016
- Headquartered: Rimrock Auto Arena at MetraPark in Billings, Montana
- Colors: Black, red, white
- BiilingsWolves.com

Personnel
- Owner: Ron Benzel
- General manager: Marc Burr
- Head coach: Chris Dixon; Defensive Coordinator Daron Brooker

Team history
- Billings Wolves (2015–2016)

Home fields
- Rimrock Auto Arena at MetraPark (2015–2016)

League / conference affiliations
- Indoor Football League (2015–2016): Intense Conference (2015–2016)

Playoff appearances (1)
- 2016

The Billings Wolves were a professional indoor football team based in Billings, Montana and members of the Indoor Football League (IFL) from 2015-2016. The Wolves began play in 2015 as an expansion team of the IFL and were owned by Ron Benzel and coached by Chris Dixon. The Wolves played their home games at the Rimrock Auto Arena at MetraPark.

== History ==
After receiving unanimous approval by the IFL's existing 9 teams, the new Billings franchise was formally announced by IFL commissioner Mike Allshouse during a press conference on February 19, 2014. The city was previously home to the IFL's Billings Outlaws who folded in 2010 after the so-called Father's Day Tornado heavily damaged their home arena.

In April 2014, the team signed a two-year contract with the Yellowstone County Commission making the Rimrock Auto Arena at MetraPark the team's home arena in 2015 and 2016. The lease cost the team $3,000 per game in 2015 and $3,500 per game in 2016, plus an "improvement fee" of $1.25 to $4.00, varying with the face value of the ticket. The contract waives the rental fee for the final home game of each season. Season tickets went on sale April 7, 2014. The team initially announced James Walton as head coach but on July 31, 2014, they signed just-retired former Billings Outlaws quarterback Chris Dixon for the job.

The Wolves played their first ever game on February 28, 2015, losing 30–17 to the Tri-Cities Fever. The Wolves struggled to win early on, beginning the season on a 4 game losing streak. On April 18, 2015, the Wolves picked up their first ever victory, 56–37 over the Green Bay Blizzard. The Wolves offense was being paced by rookie quarterback Dakaratalib Britt, who had thrown for 13 touchdowns in his first 3 games, but during the Wolves first victory, Britt suffered an injury that sidelined him for the next three games, where the Wolves would fail to win a game. Upon Britt's return to the team, the Wolves improved dramatically on offense and the Wolves won 4 of their last 5 games. The Wolves finished their first season 5–9, finishing fourth in the Intense Conference. At the conclusion of the season, defensive back Michael Green was named the Defensive Rookie of the Year.

With the return of Britt for the 2016 season, the Wolves looked to be a playoff contender out of the gates. However after a 2–2 start, Britt injured his elbow forcing the Wolves to start rookie Jawad Yatim. Yatim lost what ended up being his only start due to suffering an injury. The Wolves then signed Mason Espinosa away from the Columbus Lions. Espinosa stepped in immediately, and put up passing numbers that made him the IFL Week 10 Offensive Player of the Week and Week 9 IFL Honorable Mention Player of the Week, tying a franchise record for TD passes in consecutive weeks. After Espinosa was sidelined due to injury, going 3–3 as the starter, the Wolves turned to another rookie, Cory Murphy, who ran for a franchise record 6 rushing touchdowns in a 49–39 victory over the Colorado Crush. The Wolves finished the season 8–8, earning the 2 seed in the Intense Conference, however they lost their first playoff game in franchise history 52–64 to the Nebraska Danger.

During the 2016 season, the Wolves' website was hacked, was never completely fixed, and was non-operational for months. Several former staff members claimed that the team had folded after the completion of the season. On October 24, 2016, the Wolves announced they had left the IFL because of state regulations and failing to find new ownership for the team.

== Players of note ==
=== All-League selections ===
- OL Nathaniel Ryan (1)
- DB Michael Green (2), Travonti Johnson (1)

=== Awards and honors ===
The following is a list of all Wolves' players who have won league Awards

Season	Player	Position	Award
2015	Michael Green	Defensive back	Defensive Rookie of the Year

== Head coaches ==
Name	Term	Regular season				Playoffs		Awards
Name	Term	W	L	T	Win%	W	L	Awards
Chris Dixon	2015–2016	13	17	0	.433	0	1	

== Season-by-season results ==
League champions	Conference champions	Division champions	Wild card berth	League leader

Season	Team	League	Conference	Regular season				Postseason results
Season	Team	League	Conference	Finish	Wins	Losses	Ties	Postseason results
2015	2015	IFL	Intense	4th	5	9	0	
2016	2016	IFL	Intense	2nd	8	8	0	Lost Intense Conference Wild Card 52-64 vs. Nebraska
Totals					13	17	0	All-time regular season record (2015–2016)
Totals					0	1	-	All-time postseason record (2015–2016)
Totals					13	18	0	All-time regular season and postseason record (2015–2016)
