= 2009 Indoor Football League season =

2009 IFL season
- League: Indoor Football League
- Sport: Indoor Football
- Duration: March 13, 2009 – July 11, 2009
- Number of teams: 19

Regular season
- Season MVP: Chris Dixon

Playoffs
- Intense champions: Billings Outlaws
- Intense runners-up: El Paso Generals
- United champions: RiverCity Rage
- United runners-up: Wichita Wild

2009 United Bowl Championship
- Champions: Billings Outlaws
- Runners-up: RiverCity Rage

IFL seasons
- 2010 →

The 2009 Indoor Football League season was the inaugural season of the Indoor Football League, a league formed as a merger between the Intense Football League and United Indoor Football. The regular season began on Friday, March 13 and ended on Saturday, July 11. The league champions were the Billings Outlaws, who defeated the RiverCity Rage in the 2009 United Bowl.

== Standings ==
=== United Conference ===
Atlantic
Team	W	L	PCT
x-Maryland Maniacs	10	4	.714
y-Rochester Raiders	9	5	.643
y-RiverCity Rage	8	6	.571
Saginaw Sting	3	11	.214
Muskegon Thunder	1	13	.071

Central
Team	W	L	PCT
z-Omaha Beef	11	3	.786
y-Bloomington Extreme	10	4	.714
y-Wichita Wild	8	6	.571
Sioux Falls Storm	6	8	.429
Sioux City Bandits	4	10	.286

=== Intense Conference ===
Lone Star
Team	W	L	PCT
x-El Paso Generals	12	2	.857
y-Abilene Ruff Riders	8	6	.571
y-San Angelo Stampede Express	5	9	.357
Corpus Christi Hammerheads	5	9	.357
Odessa Roughnecks	3	11	.214

Pacific
Team	W	L	PCT
z-Billings Outlaws	12	2	.857
y-Fairbanks Grizzlies	7	7	.500
y-Colorado Ice	5	9	.357
Alaska Wild	0	14	.000

z=clinched top seed in conference, x=clinched division, y=clinched wild card spot

== Playoffs ==
Henrietta, NY	College Park, MD
3	RiverCity	45
3	RiverCity	55
2	Rochester	42	Park City, KS
1	Maryland	31
United Conference
Bloomington, IL	A3	RiverCity	43
Omaha, NE
C3	Wichita	30
3	Wichita	46	United Conference Championship
3	Wichita	39
2	Bloomington	37	Billings, MT
1	Omaha	34
Wild Card Round
Conference Semi-finals
Abilene, TX	U6	RiverCity	62
El Paso, TX
I1	Billings	71
3	San Angelo	37	2009 United Bowl
3	San Angelo	37
2	Abilene	34	Billings, MT
1	El Paso	75
Intense Conference
Fairbanks, AK	LS1	El Paso	35
Billings, MT
P1	Billings	66
3	Colorado	14	Intense Conference Championship
2	Fairbanks	7
2	Fairbanks	42
1	Billings	50

== Awards ==
=== Individual season awards ===
Award	Winner	Position	Team
Most Valuable Player	Chris Dixon	QB	BIL
Offensive Player of the Year	Chris Dixon	QB	BIL
Defensive Player of the Year	Michael Landry	DB	BIL
Special Teams Player of the Year	Demarcus James	KR	AK
Offensive Rookie of the Year	Darius Fudge	RB	WIC
Defensive Rookie of the Year	Michael Eby	DB	BIL
Coach of the Year	Brian Brents	HC	EP

=== 1st Team All-IFL ===
Offense
Quarterback	Chris Dixon, Billings
Running back	Darius Fudge, Wichita
Wide receiver	James Walton, Billings; Clinton Solomon, Wichita; DeAngelo Woodie, El Paso
Offensive lineman	Bruce McCaleb, Sioux Falls; Jermaine Pruitt, El Paso; Jordon Piccou, Sioux City

Defense
Defensive line	Michael Landry, Billings; Ron Ellington, El Paso; Eddie Bynes, Rochester
Linebacker	Joe Bevis, River City; Lamont Reid, Wichita
Defensive back	Joey Longoria, Abilene; LaRoche Jackson, Bloomington; Brent Hafford, Omaha

Special teams
Kicker	Peter Christofilakos, Bloomington
Kick returner	Demarcus James, Alaska

=== 2nd Team All-IFL ===
Offense
Quarterback	Tommy Jones, El Paso
Running back	Sean Treasure, Sioux Falls
Wide receiver	Lonnie Sanders, Fairbanks; Jimmy Conner, Odessa; Rob Mager, Rochester
Offensive lineman	Charleston Gray, Wichita; Tyree Spinner, Maryland; Kiamni Jones, Omaha

Defense
Defensive end	Oby Arah, Maryland; Corey Johnsen, Sioux Falls; Michael Bazemore, Outlaws
Linebacker	Kyle McKenzie, Saginaw; Tonga Spetlar, Omaha
Defensive back	James Temple, Bloomington; Mike Hill, Maryland; Michael Eby, Billings

Special teams
Kicker	Scott Greene, Muskegon
Kick returner	Randy Kelly, Wichita
