= El Paso Generals =

Logo

General information
- Founded: 2009
- Folded: 2009
- Headquartered: El Paso County Coliseum in El Paso, Texas
- Colors: Navy, green, gold, black
- Mascot: Patton

Personnel
- Owners: Allegiance Pro Sports, Inc.
- General manager: Dart Clark
- Head coach: Brian Brents
- President: Brandon Smith

Team history
- El Paso Generals (2009)

Home fields
- El Paso County Coliseum (2009)

League / conference affiliations
- Indoor Football League (2009): Intense Conference (2009); Lonestar Division (2009)

Championships
- Division championships: 1; 2009

Playoff appearances (1)
- 2009

The El Paso Generals were a professional indoor football team that played in the Indoor Football League in the 2009 season. Based in El Paso, Texas, the Generals played their home games at the El Paso County Coliseum. The Generals were the first indoor football team in El Paso since the charter Intense Football League member the El Paso Rumble folded following their only season in 2004 and had finished 0–16.

== History ==
In 2011, former general manager, Dart Clark, tried to revive the Generals franchise, but it never came to fruition.

== Season records ==
League champions	Conference champions	Division champions	Playoff berth	League leader

Season	League	Conference	Division	Regular season				Postseason results
Season	League	Conference	Division	Finish	Wins	Losses	Ties	Postseason results
2009	IFL	Intense	Lone Star	1st	12	2	0	Won Conference Semifinals (San Angelo) 75–37; Lost Conference Championship (Billings) 35–66
Totals					13	3	0	
