= Billings Outlaws =

American indoor football team

- Founded: 2000
- Folded: 2010
- Team history: Billings Thunderbolts (2000); Billings Outlaws (2001–2004); Billings Mavericks (2005); Billings Outlaws (2006–2010)
- Based in: Rimrock Auto Arena in Billings, Montana
- Home arena: Rimrock Auto Arena (2000–2010)
- Mascots: Rocky Fork Regulators, Gunsmoke
- League: Indoor Football League (2000): Western Conference (2000); Northern Division (2000); National Indoor Football League (2001–2006): Pacific Conference (2002; Central Division (2001); Northern Division (2002, 2006); Western Division (2003–2005); United Indoor Football (2007–2008): Western Division (2007–2008); Indoor Football League (2009–2010): Intense Conference (2009–2010); Pacific Division (2009); Mountain West Division (2010)
- Colors: Blue, silver, black, white

Personnel
- Head coach: Heron O'Neal
- General manager: Adam Steadman
- Team president: Mike Parnell

Championships
- League titles (3): 2006, 2009, 2010
- Conference titles (3): 2002, 2009, 2010
- Division titles (4): 2004, 2006, 2009, 2010

Playoff appearances (8)
- 2002, 2004, 2005, 2006, 2007, 2008, 2009, 2010

The Billings Outlaws were a professional indoor football team based in Billings, Montana. They were a member of the Indoor Football League (IFL), of which they were the 2-time defending champions. They played their home games at Rimrock Auto Arena at MetraPark. Their games were broadcast live locally on News Talk 910 KBLG AM and online through Teamline.

== Seasons ==
=== 2000–2001 seasons ===
The team originally began play as a 2000 expansion member of the original Indoor Football League as the Billings Thunderbolts. Despite a winning record of 8–6, it was not enough to make the playoffs. When the league folded, they became a charter member of the National Indoor Football League in 2001 and became the Billings Outlaws until the 2005 season when they were the Billings Mavericks and the start of the 2006 season, when a naming dispute with the Osceola Outlaws led to the NIFL stripping both teams of the Outlaws name. However, as of June 11, 2006, the NIFL recognized Billings as the Outlaws again.

=== 2002 season ===
The Outlaws first year in the playoffs. Many people thought it would be unexpected of Billings to make it all the way to the championship especially after coming second in their division but they did so and proved many wrong. It was not easy, as Bismarck was in for a fight. Both games were decided in the final minute, in which Outlaws prevailed. The championship game was the same other than the difference that the Ohio Valley Greyhounds took home the win and proved to be the best team winning 55–52 and pulling out an overall record that year of 15–1 while the Outlaws finished the season with an overall record of 12–5.

=== 2003–2005 season ===
The Outlaws played hard but fell short of a .500 plus record and missed out on the playoffs in 2003. In 2004, the Billings squad dominated their way to a record of 11–3. But, the Outlaws would be triumphed in Sioux Falls in the Conference Semi-Finals. After a great year, the Billings Outlaws became the Billings Mavericks. This fell into place when the Osceola Outlaws joined the NIFL. The two teams disputed over who should be named the Outlaws. The league commissioner decided to strip both teams of the name and make each team pick a new one for the 2005 season. The Mavericks became the new team to cheer for, but they came to the end of their worst season in this franchises ten-year history. They fell to 5–9 on the season but managed to make the playoffs. They played the Everett Hawks in Washington. As the underdog, some players saw a miracle on the horizon. But, the happy ending was cut short. The Mavericks held strong in the end but lost by a disheartening three points and Everett moved on to the next round of the playoffs.

=== 2006 season ===
The 2006 season was a success as the Outlaws were handed only one loss in Week 2 to Tri-Cities Fever but then redeemed themselves by beating Tri-Cities three times that same year including a win in the playoffs. After defeating Tri-Cities in the first round, the Outlaws took down their league rival the Rapid City Flying Aces in a high intensity game that came down to the end. The Outlaws then hosted the NIFL Indoor Bowl VI on July 28, 2006, in front of a sold out MetraPark and beat the Fayetteville Guard 59–44 in an offensive showcase.

=== 2007 season ===
After the 2006 season, the Outlaws announced they were joining United Indoor Football for the 2007 season. The first season for the Outlaws in the UIF started out terrible as they fell to 0–4. Soon after, they became a team to fear as the Outlaws finished off the final ten games going 8–2. Even with all the confidence and momentum they could not hold up against the Sioux Falls Storm in the second round of the playoffs.

=== 2008 season ===
The 2008 season was a more exciting and successful year but yet again the Outlaws would lose to Sioux Falls in the Western Conference Finals but this game was more heart pounding as the Billings Outlaws held a lead of 44–43 but with less tham 5 seconds left in the game Sioux Falls kicker Adam Hicks booted a 45-yard field goal through the uprights as the clock expired to claim a 46–44 win. The Outlaws were very frustrated after the game and had reasons. The Outlaws kicker went 1 of 4 on field goals in the Billings loss. Billings had lost two games earlier that season because of their horrid kicking game. After the end of the 2008 season they became members of the Indoor Football League through the UIF's merger with the Intense Football League.

=== 2009 season ===
During the 2009 season the Outlaws had played tough and received two losses which came at the Omaha Civic Auditorium against the Omaha Beef. The second loss was very controversial as the Outlaws came on the field to tie the game up with one second remaining, but an Outlaws player was injured, requiring ten seconds to be run off the clock resulting in a 48–45 victory for the Beef. The Outlaws had won seven in a row until that loss but on the streak it included three wins against the four time defending UIF champion Sioux Falls Storm with scores of 42–41, 70–35, and 34–22. The last of these games was in Sioux Falls and snapped the Storm's 35 home-game win streak. The Outlaws then were considered the best team in the league and proved it against the RiverCity Rage by defeating them in the United Bowl 71–62 in front of a near capacity crowd of 8,351.

=== 2010 season ===
Kicking off the season at home, the Outlaws had a brutal win over Kent, one of the new league franchises. Not long after the win, the Outlaws suffered a loss on a no-call on pass interference, this left Sioux Falls victorious and the Outlaws dumbfounded with 1 in the loss column, and the second and last loss was controversial because the Outlaws were called for three penalties in the final minute of the game to which Fairbanks countered with a last second score to win 55–54. The Outlaws rebounded after the loss with a scoring onslaught to defeat the Tri-Cities Fever twice, the Kent Predators once, the San Angelo Stampede Express once, the Arkansas Diamonds once, and the Sioux Falls Storm twice. The Outlaws again won the United Bowl, this time over long-time rival Sioux Falls by a score of 43–34 on July 17, 2010, in front of a packed house in the Sportsplex. The original home of the Outlaws, the Metrapark was heavily damaged by an F2 tornado following their last game of the regular season.

=== Team ceases operations ===
On October 7, 2010, the Outlaws announced they would cease operations due to not having enough money for the 2011 season, this was in large part due to a disagreement with county commissioners over funding non-insured losses suffered during the 2010 tornado that severely damaged the Rimrock Auto Arena. Indoor football would return to Billings five years later when the IFL awarded Billings an expansion franchise, the Billings Wolves. The Wolves were coached in their first year by former Outlaws quarterback Chris Dixon who had gone on to win three more IFL titles with the Sioux Falls Storm following his consecutive titles in 2009 and 2010 with the Outlaws.

== Training facility ==
A training facility costing around $3 million was built for the Outlaws and opened in March 2007. A facility of this nature is unprecedented in any indoor or arena league other than the Arena Football League. Photos of this facility can be found here. The facility is called the Outlaws Community SportsPlex. This facility has been used for many events and purposes such as practice, fundraisers, birthday parties, Montana State University Billings' Inter-Tribal Indian Club's Powwow, try-outs, and much more.

== Schedules ==
=== 2009 schedule ===
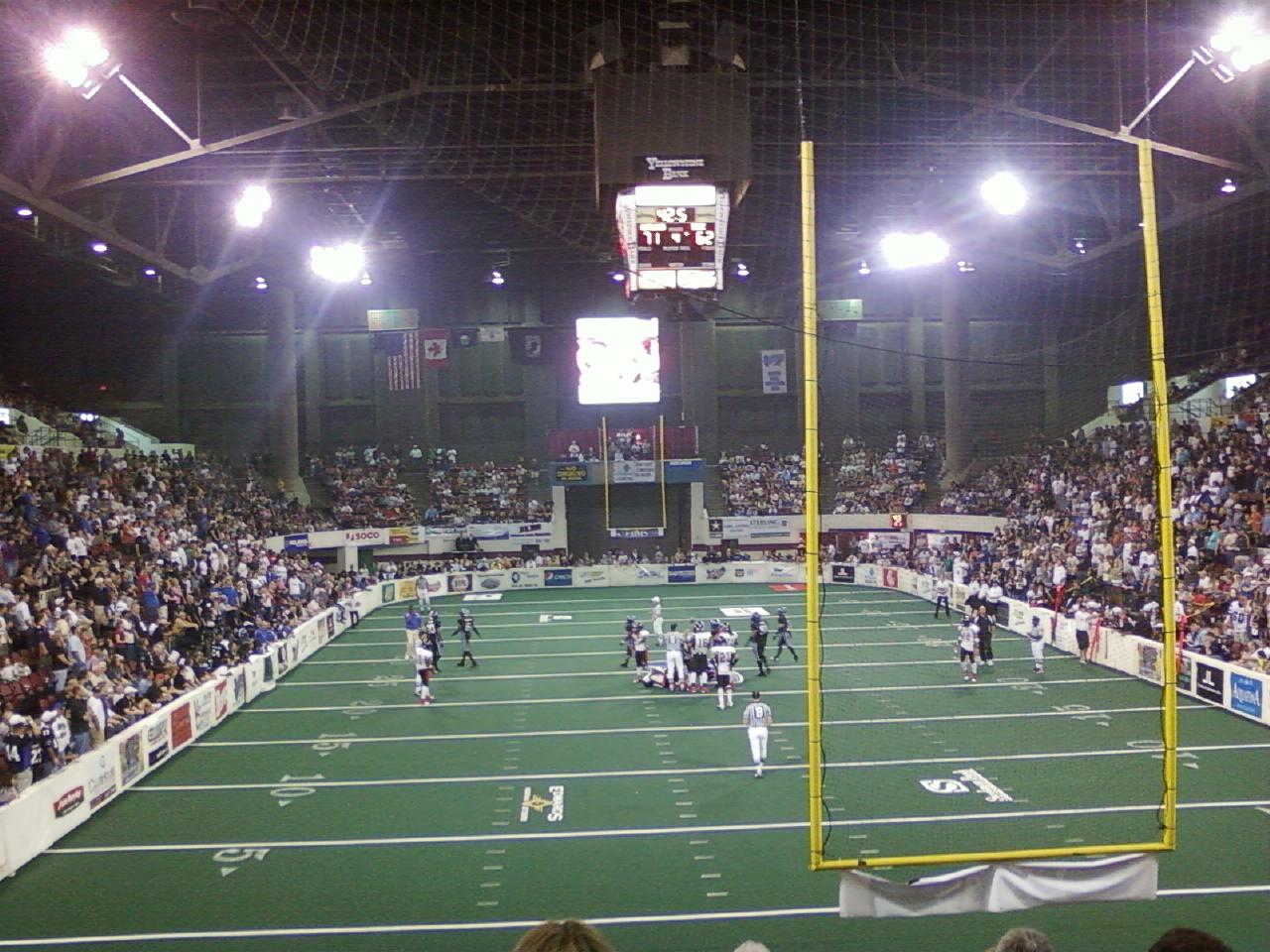
Seconds before the Outlaws 2009 United Bowl victory

Opponent	Result
Regular Season	14 games
Sioux City Bandits	Won 82–12
@ Colorado Ice	Won 46–41
Omaha Beef	Won 52–40
Fairbanks Grizzlies	Won 74–3
@ Omaha Beef	Lost 48–33
Sioux Falls Storm	Won 42–41
@ Fairbanks Grizzlies	Won 72–35
Alaska Wild	Won 68–32
@ Fairbanks Grizzlies	Won 59–55
@ Alaska Wild	Won 73–18
Sioux Falls Storm	Won 70–35
@ Sioux Falls Storm	Won 34–22
Colorado Ice	Won 83–30
@ Omaha Beef	Lost 48–45
Playoffs	3 games
Fairbanks Grizzlies	Won 50–7
El Paso Generals	Won 66–35
River City Rage	Won 71–62

Streak	Wins
Win Streak	7
Home Win Streak	23
Away Win Streak	1

== Coaching staff ==
Head Coach- Heron O'Neal

Offensive Line- Artavious Williams

== Statistics ==
- playoffs not included

=== Passing leaders ===
Year	Player	Att	Comp	Comp Pct	TD	INT	QB RTG	GP
2010	Chris Dixon	308	214	70%	63	7	120	13
2009	Chris Dixon	292	209	72%	69	7	127	14
2008	Chris Dixon	385	264	69%	63	10	119	14
2007	Chris Dixon	286	184	64%	52	8	112	12

=== Receiving leaders ===
Year	Player	No.	Yds	Avg	TD	Long	Avg/G	GP
2010	James Walton	60	730	12.2	22	43	56.2	13
2009	James Walton	67	911	13.6	34	49	65.1	14
2008	Robert Reed	70	781	11.2	19	37	60.1	13
2007	Anthony Candler	52	567	10.9	14	46	43.6	12

=== Rushing leaders ===
Year	Player	Att	Gain	Avg	TD	Long	Avg/G	GP
2010	Chris Dixon	104	543	5.2	12	30	41.7	13
2009	Timothy Brown	73	483	6.4	7	41	38.7	11
2008	Chris Dixon	86	421	4.4	7	30	27.3	14
2007	Eddie Linscomb	99	499	4.8	9	38	47.7	10

=== Interception leaders ===
Year	Player	No.	Yds	Avg/G	TD	Long
2010	Travonti Johnson	4	96	24	2	---
2009	Michael Eby	10	87	8.7	0	22
2008	Travonti Johnson	12	127	10.6	3	39
2007	Corey Roberson	5	33	6.6	0	12

=== Sack leaders ===
Year	Player	Sacks	Yds	Avg/G	GP
2010	Mike Bazemore	9.5	----	.80	12
2009	Michael Landry	12	82	1.2	11
2008	Mike Bazemore	6.5	40	.46	14
2007	Eugene Phillips	10	63	.71	14

== Rivals ==
- playoffs not included

Opponent	Wins	Losses	Last 5
Alaska Wild	4	0	4–0
Colorado Ice	8	2	5–0
Fairbanks Grizzlies	4	1	4–1
Kent Predators	3	0	3–0
Omaha Beef	8	3	3–2
Sioux Falls Storm	8	11	4–1

== Championship scores ==
Year	Winner	Loser	Score
2002	Ohio Valley	Billings Outlaws	55-52
2006	Billings Outlaws	Fayetteville Guard	59-44
2009	Billings Outlaws	River City Rage	71-62
2010	Billings Outlaws	Sioux Falls Storm	43-34

== Season-by-season ==
Season records
Season	W	L	T	Finish	Playoff results
Billings Thunderbolts (Indoor Football League)
2000	8	6	0	4th WC Northern	--
Billings Outlaws (National Indoor Football League)
2001	7	7	0	4th League Central	--
2002	12	5	0	2nd Pacific West	Won Round 1 (Lincoln Capitols); Won Conference Championship (Bismarck Roughriders); Lost Indoor Bowl II (Ohio Valley Greyhounds)
2003	6	8	0	5th Pacific West	--
2004	12	4	0	1st Pacific West	Won Pacific Semi-Final (Omaha Beef); Lost Pacific Conference Championship (Sioux Falls Storm)
Billings Mavericks (National Indoor Football League)
2005	5	10	0	3rd Pacific West	Lost Pacific Quarterfinal (Everett Hawks)
Billings Outlaws (National Indoor Football League)
2006	16	1	0	1st Pacific North	Won Pacific Semi-Final (Tri-Cities Fever); Won Pacific Conference Championship (Rapid City Flying Aces); Won Indoor Bowl VI (Fayetteville Guard)
Billings Outlaws (United Indoor Football)
2007	9	7	0	2nd West	Won Round 1 (Omaha Beef); Lost Western Championship (Sioux Falls Storm)
2008	11	5	0	2nd West	Won Round 1 (Omaha Beef); Lost Western Championship (Sioux Falls Storm)
Billings Outlaws (Indoor Football League)
2009	15	2	0	1st Intense Pacific	Won Pacific Divisional Championship (Fairbanks Grizzlies); Won Instense Conference Championship (El Paso Generals); Won 2009 United Bowl (RiverCity Rage)
2010	16	2	0	1st Pacific North	Won Round 1 (Tri-Cities Fever); Won Conference Semi-Final (San Angelo Stampede); Won Intense Conference Championship (Arkansas Diamonds); Won 2010 United Bowl (Sioux Falls Storm)
Total	104	41	0	(Regular season and playoffs) Billings Outlaws	
Total	117	57	0	(Regular season and playoffs) Billings Outlaws/Thunderbolts/Mavericks	
