= Fairbanks Grizzlies =

Logo

General information
- Founded: 2007
- Folded: 2011
- Headquartered: Carlson Center in Fairbanks, Alaska
- Colors: Blue, orange, white
- Mascot: Tundra

Personnel
- Owners: Chad Dittman; Ricky Bertz; Michael Taylor
- Head coach: Robert Fuller

Team history
- Fairbanks Grizzlies (2008–2011)

Home fields
- Carlson Center (2008–2011)

League / conference affiliations
- Intense Football League (2008) Indoor Football League (2009–2011): Intense Conference (2009–2011); Pacific Division (2009, 2011); Pacific North Division (2010)

Championships
- Division championships: 1; 2011

Playoff appearances (3)
- 2009, 2010, 2011

The Fairbanks Grizzlies were a professional indoor football team based in Fairbanks, Alaska. The team was a member of the Pacific Division of the Intense Conference in the Indoor Football League (IFL). The Grizzlies began play in 2008 as a member of the Intense Football League and joined the IFL in 2008 as part of the Intense Football League and United Indoor Football (UIF) merger. The team played their home games at the Carlson Center in Fairbanks.

The Grizzlies were notable for being the northernmost professional gridiron football team in history; the Alaska Wild held the previous record, and before that, the Edmonton Eskimos. Grizzlies games were broadcast live on KCBF. (The northernmost gridiron football team of any sort is the high school football team of Barrow High School.)

The Grizzlies suspended operations in October 2011 in the face of lawsuits against the team.

== Season-by-season ==
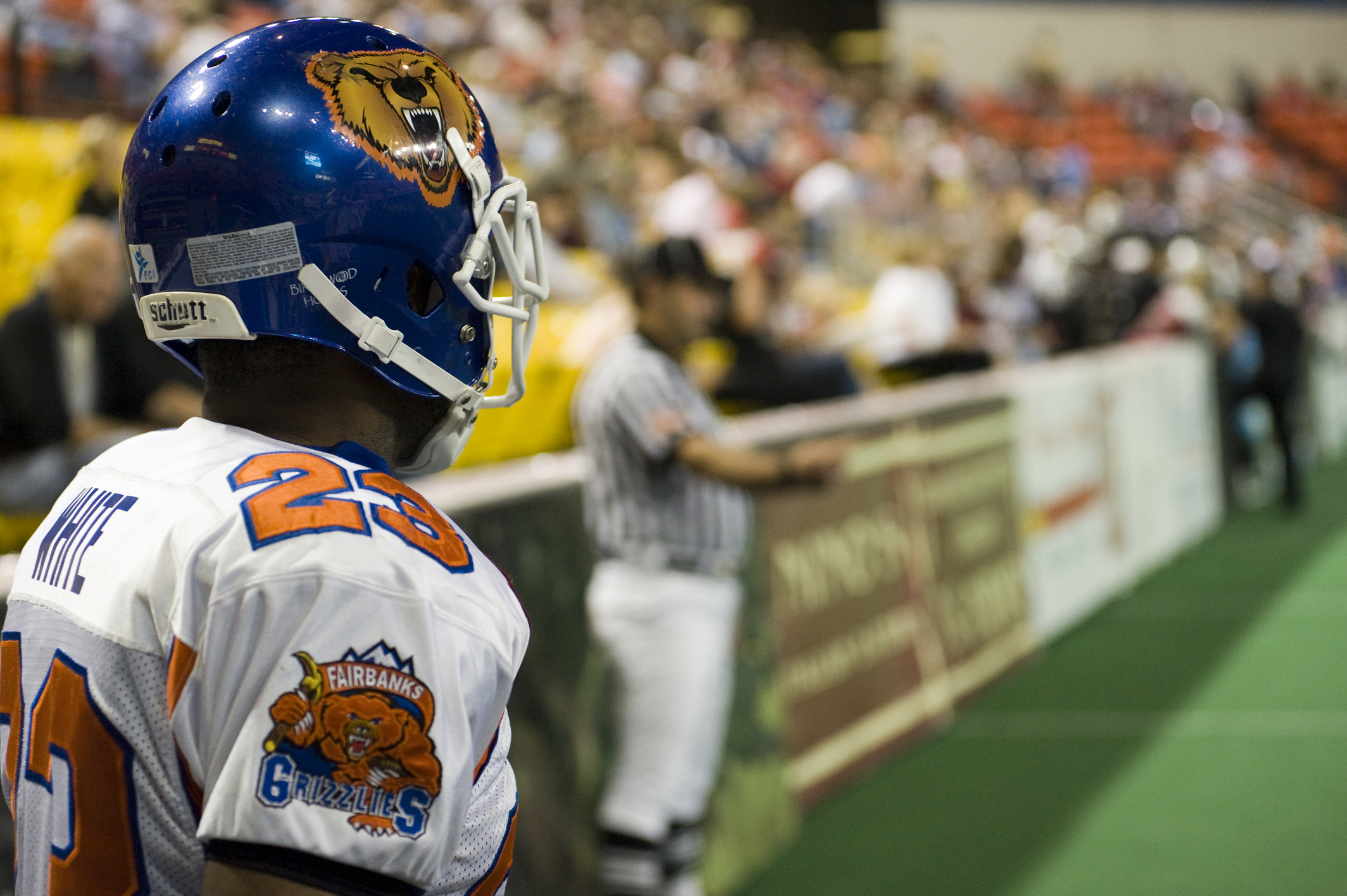
Grizzlies player, Daudi White, in 2009

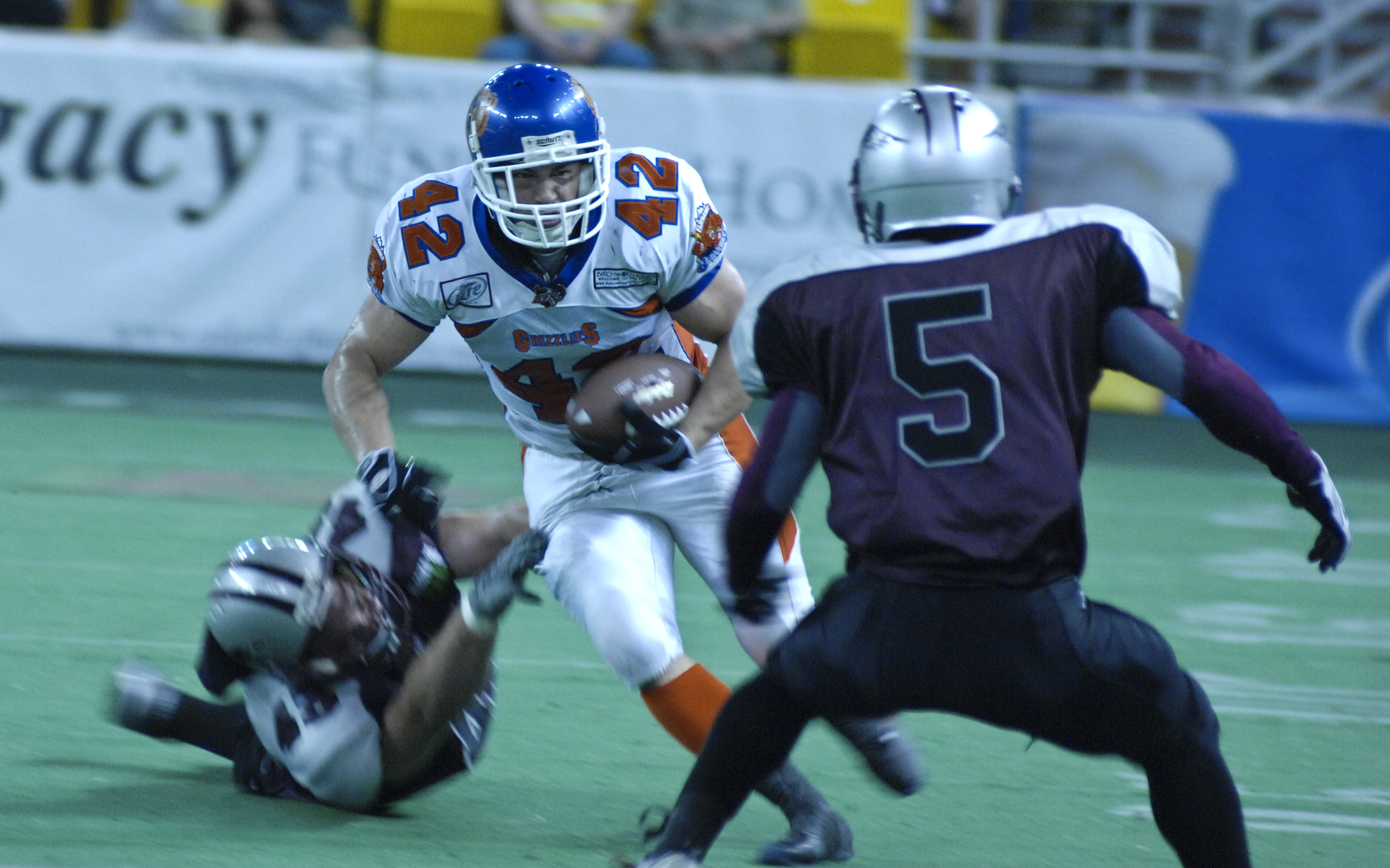
The Grizzlies in a game against the Alaska Wild in July 2009.

Season records
Season	W	L	T	Finish	Playoff results
Fairbanks Grizzlies (Intense Football League)
2008	3	11	0	9th League	--
Fairbanks Grizzlies (Indoor Football League)
2009	7	7	0	2nd Intense Pacific	Won Divisionals I (Colorado); Lost Divisionals II (Billings)
2010	9	5	0	2nd Pacific North	Lost First Round (Billings)
2011	10	4	0	1st Pacific	Lost Conference Semi-Final (Allen)
Totals	30	30	0	(including playoffs)	

== Notable players ==
See Category:Fairbanks Grizzlies players
