= RiverCity Rage =

Professional indoor football team

Logo

General information
- Founded: 2001
- Ended: 2011
- Headquartered: Saint Charles, Missouri, U.S.
- Colors: Black, Red, White
- Mascot: Ragey
- RageFootball.com

Personnel
- Owners: Robert Sprowls; Jeff Sprowls
- General manager: Barney Welch
- Head coach: Patrick Pimmel

Team history
- St. Louis Renegades (2001); RiverCity Renegades (2002); Show-Me Believers (2003–2004); RiverCity Rage (2005–2010)

Home fields
- Family Arena (2001–2005, 2007–2009); Scottrade Center (2006)

League / conference affiliations
- Indoor Professional Football League (2001); National Indoor Football League (2002–2006); United Indoor Football (2007–2008); Indoor Football League (2009)

Championships
- Division championships: 2 2005, 2006

The RiverCity Rage were a professional indoor football team in the Indoor Football League. They played home games at the Family Arena in Saint Charles, Missouri, a suburb of St. Louis, Missouri,

== History ==
The Rage began play in 2001 as the St. Louis Renegades of the Indoor Professional Football League, finishing fourth in the league with a 2–11 record. After the IPFL folded, the team moved to the National Indoor Football League in 2002 and became the RiverCity Renegades. The team finished its first season in the NIFL with a 1–13 record. For 2003–2004, the team was renamed the Show-Me Believers. In the first season under the new name, the team finished with a 4–10 record that showed improvement, despite being a losing record. In 2004, the team finished the season with a winning record for the first time at 9–5. In 2005, the team was renamed to the RiverCity Rage. The Rage won the 2005 East Atlantic Conference Division with a record of 10–4. With this record, the team finished in a three-way tie for the best regular-season record; however, the team lost its Conference Quarterfinals game 67-64 to the Cincinnati Marshals.

In 2006, the Rage finished in a four-way tie for the best regular season record at 13–1 and advanced to the Atlantic Conference championship game, losing to the Fayetteville Guard.

After the 2006 season, the Rage joined United Indoor Football for 2007.

In 2008, the RiverCity Rage struggled through a seven-game losing streak before winning three of their last four games to make the playoffs. They won by a last-minute touchdown in a home playoff game against the Sioux City Bandits, but lost the Conference Finals on the road to the Bloomington Extreme, 33–7.

In 2009, the Rage joined the Indoor Football League, a new league created out of the merger between the UIF and the Intense Football League. On August 15, 2009, the Rage lost the Indoor Football League championship to the Billings Outlaws 71-62.

Jeff Sprowls, who also owned the Omaha Beef at the time, announced about a month after the end of the season that the Rage would cease operations and would not play in the 2010 season, due to financial issues in Omaha. At the time the Indoor Football League website said that the Rage could potentially return in 2011, but the team folded in 2011 when no new owner was found.
