= San Angelo Stampede Express =

American indoor football team

Logo

General information
- Founded: 2003
- Folded: 2012
- Headquartered: San Angelo, Texas at the Foster Communications Coliseum
- Colors: Burgundy, Gold
- Mascot: Stomper

Personnel
- Owner: Darlene Jones
- Head coach: Clint Dolezel
- President: Patsy McIntire

Team history
- San Angelo Stampede (2004–2005); San Angelo Stampede Express (2006–2011)

Home fields
- Foster Communications Coliseum (2004-2012)

League / conference affiliations
- Intense Football League (2004, 2006–2008); National Indoor Football League (2005); Indoor Football League (2009–2010); Lone Star Football League (2012; never played)

The San Angelo Stampede Express were a professional indoor football team from San Angelo, Texas owned by Darlene Jones. They were announced as a charter member of the Lone Star Football League but folded before play began in 2012. They played their home games in the Foster Communications Coliseum. They changed their name from the San Angelo Stampede for the 2006 season.

== Season-by-season ==
Season records
Season	W	L	T	Finish	Playoff results
San Angelo Stampede (Intense Football League)
2004	9	7	0	4th League	Lost Semifinal (Amarillo)
San Angelo Stampede (NIFL)
2005	2	11	0	3rd Pacific Central	--
San Angelo Stampede Express (Intense Football League)
2006	3	11	0	5th League	--
2007	4	10	0	6th League	--
2008	5	9	0	8th League	--
San Angelo Stampede Express (Indoor Football League)
2009	5	9	0	3rd Intense Lone Star	Won Divisionals I (Abilene); Lost Divisionals II (El Paso)
2010	10	4	0	2nd Intense Lonestar East	Won Divisionals I (Fairbanks); Lost Divisionals II (Billings)
2011	Did not play				
San Angelo Stampede Express (LSFL)
2012	Did not play				
Totals	36	63	0	(including playoffs)	

== History ==
=== 2003 ===
On August 9, San Angelo confirmed that the Express would be a new expansion member of the Intense Football League.

=== 2006 ===
Before the season began owner Darlene Jones announced that the team's goal is to "Win Football Games!!". Jones made big changes with the announcement of new general manager Bridget Jones and new head coach J. T. Smith. The team showcased new Home field uniforms.

=== 2007 ===
In February the Stampede announced the hiring of former player Johnny Anderson. The team retired his number 6. On May 2 the Stampede's front office announced the suspension of head coach Johnny Anderson for 10 days. The reason for the suspension was Anderson was being investigated by the San Angelo Police Department regarding a physical assault on two women.

=== 2009 ===
In 2009, former Texas Tech quarterback Sonny Cumbie was named head coach and director of player personnel to replace Jon Loudermilk. Cumbie was the 10th head coach named in the team's history. As a player, Cumbie had stints with the Indianapolis Colts, Baltimore Ravens and finally the Los Angeles Avengers of the Arena Football League (AFL). Four games into the 2009 Stampede Express season, Cumbie became the starting quarterback and lead the team to the playoffs for the first time in franchise history.

=== 2010 ===
Clint Dolezel, a 13-year veteran of the AFL, was named head coach and the team had their best season in franchise history with a 10–4 record. The Express lost in the conference semifinals to the Billings Outlaws. Running Back Derrick Ross was named Rookie of the Year and led the league in rushing yards as well as touchdowns.

== Retired numbers ==
- Johnny Anderson- # 6

== Notable players ==
- Sonny Cumbie- Head Coach and QB
- Jonathan Hamm- Boxer and Actor
- Derrick Ross
- Edwin James- LB
- Mitch Ables - WR - Player - Coach - First Touchdown in San Angelo Stampede History
- Trae Ivory - LB - IFL single game tackle record versus Odessa Roughnecks in April 2009.
- Devin Livingston Center- 2009 IFL 1st team Center
- John Escobar FB 2007
- Donald Carrie QB 2007
- Eddie Hunter DS 2007
