= Indoor Football League =

Indoor American football league founded in 2008

- Upcoming season or competition: 2027 Indoor Football League season
- Sport: Indoor American football
- Founded: July 22, 2008 (18 years ago)
- First season: 2009
- Commissioner: Todd Tryon
- Claim to fame: America's longest continuously running indoor football league
- No. of teams: 17
- Country: United States
- Headquarters: Sioux Falls, SD
- Most recent champions: Arizona Rattlers (3rd title)
- Most titles: Sioux Falls Storm (7 titles)
- Broadcaster: Yahoo! Sports Network
- Streaming partner: IFL Network
- Website: goifl.com

The Indoor Football League (IFL) is a professional indoor American football league in the United States. The league comprises 14 teams, divided equally between the Eastern Conference (EC) and Western Conference (WC). The IFL is the highest professional level of indoor football and the longest continuously running indoor football league in the United States.

The IFL was formed in 2008 when the Intense Football League and United Indoor Football agreed to merge following the conclusion of the 2008 National Indoor Bowl, which pinned the two league's champions against each other. The league has operated continuously under the same name and corporate structure longer than any other current indoor football league. Following the closure of the original Arena Football League in 2019, the IFL became the oldest active professional indoor football league in North America, and can trace its history to 2003.

Each IFL season has a 19-week regular season which runs from the middle of March to the end of July, with each team playing 16 games and having three bye weeks. Following the conclusion of the regular season, four teams from each conference advance to the playoffs, a single-elimination tournament, which culminates in the IFL National Championship, played in late August between the winners of the EC and WC championship games.

IFL players earn US$250–500 (before taxes) per game played, with a $25 bonus given to players on the winning team each week. Additionally some teams provide housing for their players during the season.

The IFL has a player personnel partnership with the United Football League (UFL), to function as their de facto minor league.

The Sioux Falls Storm hold the most IFL championships with seven. The reigning league champions are the Arizona Rattlers.

== History ==
Number of Teams Each Year
| Season | # Teams |
|---|---|
| 2009 | 19 |
| 2010 | 25 |
| 2011 | 22 |
| 2012 | 16 |
| 2013 | 9 |
| 2014 | 9 |
| 2015 | 10 |
| 2016 | 10 |
| 2017 | 10 |
| 2018 | 6 |
| 2019 | 10 |
| 2020 | 13 |
| 2021 | 12 |
| 2022 | 14 |
| 2023 | 14 |
| 2024 | 16 |
| 2025 | 14 |
| 2026 | 14 |
| 2027 | 18 |

=== Formation ===
The league was formed as a merger between the Intense Football League and United Indoor Football, announced the day before the 2008 National Indoor Bowl Championship, a game which pitted the champions of the two leagues against each other. The Sioux Falls Storm (United) defeated the Louisiana Swashbucklers (Intense) 54–42.

==== 2009 season ====
Of the 17 teams involved in the two previous leagues, 14 moved over to the new organization's 2009 season. An additional three teams came over from the CIFL and two expansion teams began their life in the new IFL. In the United Bowl, the Billings Outlaws (Intense Conference) took the league championship by defeating the RiverCity Rage (United Conference) by a score of 71–62.

=== 2010s ===
==== 2010 season ====
After losing two teams to attrition after the end of the 2009 season, and a third in January 2010, the IFL then added another nine franchises to boost its membership to 25 for the 2010 season. Three of the new teams were expansion franchises. Two moved over from the Southern Indoor Football League and Continental Indoor Football League. After playing nine games of the 2010 season the Alaska Wild suspended operations, leaving only 24 teams to finish the year. In the United Bowl, the Billings Outlaws (Intense Conference) took the league championship by defeating the Sioux Falls Storm (United Conference) by a score of 43–34.

==== 2011 season ====
Seven new teams were added to the IFL for the 2011 season. Some of these were new expansion teams, and others moved to the IFL from the AIFA. The IFL also lost nine teams during the offseason, bringing the total number to 22 for 2011. In the United Bowl, the Sioux Falls Storm (United Conference) took the league championship by defeating the Tri-Cities Fever (Intense Conference) by a score of 37–10.

==== 2012 season ====
The league had 16 teams that played the 2012 season. For the 2012 season, the IFL switched to a two-conference format with no divisions, due in large part to the loss of all the Texas-based teams (except the Allen Wranglers) to the newly formed Lone Star Football League. The Wranglers brought attention to the league for offering a $500,000 contract to unemployed wide receiver Terrell Owens to become the team's part-owner and wide receiver. Owens accepted the contract. ESPN3 carried Owens's debut game against the Wichita Wild, but his association with the team and the league proved to be short-lived. The front office of the league saw changes as well, as Commissioner Tommy Benizio resigned. The league appointed assistant commissioner Robert Loving as the interim Commissioner.

==== 2013 season ====
On October 12, 2012, the Bloomington Edge announced that the team had been sold to the owners of the Bloomington Blaze hockey franchise and would relocate to the new Champions Professional Indoor Football League for the 2013 season. On January 21, 2013, the league announced that the owner of the Cheyenne Warriors had died and that the team would not be entering the league this season as planned.

==== 2014 season ====
The league added the Minnesota-based Bemidji Axemen to expand to 10 teams but the Chicago Slaughter were sold and changed leagues, returning the IFL to nine teams for the 2014 season. In February 2014, the league announced that it would return to Montana in 2015 with the new Billings Wolves franchise.

==== 2015 season ====
On July 27, 2014, Iowa Barnstormers president Jeff Lamberti hinted at joining the league by telling a local TV station that the franchise will explore "all options" in the off-season of their continuance to play, including leaving the Arena Football League and going to the IFL for 2015. They joined the IFL in August 2014, becoming the fourth active AFL/af2 franchise to leave for the IFL since the Texas Revolution (formerly the Arkansas Twisters), the Tri-Cities Fever and the Green Bay Blizzard. (The Revolution left the IFL for Champions Indoor Football before ceasing operations in May 2019.)

==== 2016 season ====
This was the first season the IFL utilized roster restrictions which call for all teams to carry no more than seven players with three or more years' experience in Indoor/Arena football. For the second consecutive season, an AFL team was strongly rumored to join the IFL, as Spokane Shock owner Nader Naini said on August 10, 2015, that he was considering all options for the team. On September 1, the Shock officially joined the IFL, becoming the fifth active AFL/af2 franchise to leave for the IFL since the aforementioned Barnstormers, Fever, Blizzard and Revolution. The Shock, however, would have to enter the IFL under a new identity as the Arena League announced on October 12 that they would retain the rights to the Shock logos and name, possibly for future use by another franchise in the state of Washington. The team subsequently held a name-the-team contest, which resulted in their new identity as the Spokane Empire.

On September 9, the Minnesota Havok (based in Mankato) were announced as an IFL team. However, on January 29, just four weeks before the 2016 season was to kick off, the Havok were terminated by the league for failing to meet operational standards.

On November 25, the Minnesota Axemen folded due to the team "Not fulfilling their commitments to the league." Commissioner Mike Allshouse called the move a proactive one to prevent the team having to fold mid-season.

==== 2017 season ====
On June 30, 2016, the IFL announced that the Tri-Cities Fever franchise would be dormant, but in good standing with the IFL, for the 2017 season.

Project FANchise, a group aiming to create a professional sports team where fans help run the day-to-day operations, announced they would operate a new team, the Salt Lake Screaming Eagles in Salt Lake City. A fan vote determined the team's name and logo, and select fans will have access to player personnel decisions and in-game play calling. Project FANchise also bought the Colorado Crush in October and began operating the team in the same manner.

During the 2016 season, the Billings Wolves' website was hacked, was never completely fixed, and was non-operational for months. Several former staff members claimed that the team had folded after the completion of the season. On October 24, 2016, the Wolves announced they had left the IFL because of state regulations and failing to find new ownership for the team.

On October 17, 2016, the IFL announced it had added the Arizona Rattlers, previously of the Arena Football League, for the 2017 season. The Rattlers were the third team in three consecutive seasons to leave the AFL for the IFL. The league rejected the bid of another former AFL franchise, the Jacksonville Sharks, who are located outside the IFL's regional territory. They subsequently announced their charter membership in an entirely new league, originally to have been called the Arena Development League but actually beginning play under the name National Arena League.

==== 2018 season ====
After the 2017 season came to a close, the website for the Colorado Crush was shut down with no formal announcement on the franchise's future. Project FANchise, which also ran the Salt Lake Screaming Eagles, had announced they would start their own league and left the IFL, with both teams going up for sale. No buyers for either team were subsequently found and the teams folded. On July 12, 2017, the Spokane Empire announced that they would be suspending operations effective immediately.

On July 25, 2017, the IFL announced that only the Arizona Rattlers, Cedar Rapids Titans, Green Bay Blizzard, Iowa Barnstormers, and Nebraska Danger had committed to play for 2018. However, expansion clubs and current member clubs had until September 1 to commit to the 2018 season. On August 30, the Sioux Falls Storm announced that they had joined Champions Indoor Football for 2018 after winning six consecutive championships from 2011 to 2016. The Storm was shortly followed by the Wichita Falls Nighthawks.

The IFL then added the Bloomington Edge and West Michigan Ironmen from the CIF on September 12. The CIF apparently then attempted to sue the IFL, Edge, and Ironmen for leaving the CIF after the two teams had already signed league affiliation agreements with the CIF for 2018. The IFL then threatened to sue the CIF, Storm, and Nighthawks in return despite neither former IFL team signing an affiliation agreement with the IFL for 2018. The CIF then retracted their lawsuit with the IFL but also removed the Storm and Nighthawks from their 2018 schedule. After the IFL meetings in October 2017, the Storm returned to the IFL but the Nighthawks had to suspend operations. While the CIF did drop the lawsuit against the IFL, it filed for an injunction against the Edge and Ironmen teams from participating in the IFL for breaking the terms of their signed affiliation agreements. A temporary injunction from participation in the league was granted on January 31, 2018, with the court ruling determining that both teams had been offered bribes from the owner of the Arizona Rattlers to break their contract with the CIF. The schedule was revised in February for the six participating teams stating the Edge and Ironmen were to return in 2019.

During the season, the Cedar Rapids Titans' ownership announced the team was for sale with hopes of selling to new local ownership. In June 2018, it was announced that the Titans had been sold to Roy Choi, a California-based businessman, with the intentions of keeping the team Cedar Rapids but would rebrand the team.

==== 2019 season ====
In August 2018, the IFL announced that the expansion Tucson Sugar Skulls, owned by Rattlers' coach Kevin Guy, were joining the league after being rumored to have joined the CIF. On September 7, the IFL announced that the Quad City Steamwheelers would join the league from the CIF. The Cedar Rapids team announced their rebrand as the Cedar Rapids River Kings on September 22. On October 5, the Bismarck Bucks of the CIF announced their move to the IFL. On November 19, the IFL announced another expansion team, the San Diego Strike Force, owned by the new Cedar Rapids owner Roy Choi to bring the league back up to ten teams. The addition of the Sugar Skulls and Strike Force gave the Rattlers geographic rivals, reducing that team's travel expenses in a league otherwise centered in the upper Midwest.

=== 2020s ===
==== 2020 season ====
League Logo used from 2020-2025

On August 20, 2019, the Duke City Gladiators joined the IFL after winning back-to-back CIF championships. On September 10, the Oakland Panthers, co-owned by former National Football League (NFL) running back Marshawn Lynch, joined the IFL for the 2020 season. On November 1, the league added the Spokane Shock after it was resurrected by former NFL player Sam Adams, with the Spokane team reacquiring the Shock brand following the Empire's folding in 2017. The Bosselman family were looking to sell the Nebraska Danger, but no owner was found before the deadline for participating in the 2020 season. On November 24, 2019, the IFL added a thirteenth team in Frisco, Texas, owned by the Germain family called the Frisco Fighters. The Germain family also purchased the sponsorship rights for the IFL, the management rights of the league's communications and marketing department, as well as a second expansion for the 2021 season in Columbus, Ohio, known as the Columbus Wild Dogs.

Two games into the 2020 season, the league postponed the rest of the season due to the COVID-19 pandemic. On April 13, 2020, the season was fully cancelled.

==== 2021 season ====
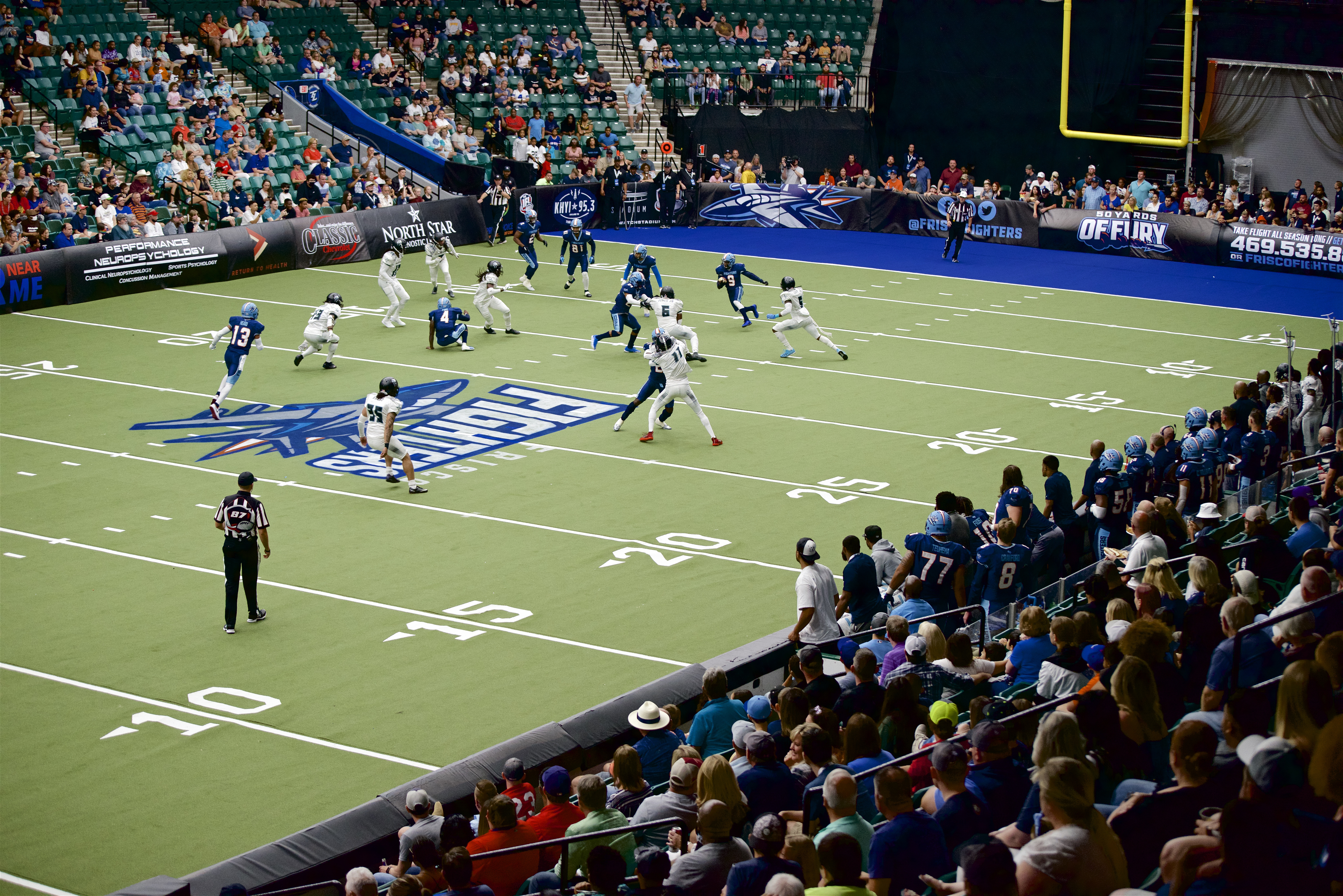
The Frisco Fighters played their inaugural home opener against the Duke City Gladiators during the 2021 season.

On June 26, 2020, the Columbus Wild Dogs announced it would not begin play until 2022. On August 19, 2020, the Massachusetts Pirates, formerly of the National Arena League, were added to the IFL for the 2021 season as the league's first East Coast-based team. On August 25, the league added the Northern Arizona Wranglers in Prescott Valley, Arizona, for the 2021 season, joining the Arizona Rattlers and Tucson Sugar Skulls as the third IFL team to be based in Arizona for 2021. On November 6, the Louisville Xtreme of Louisville, Kentucky, was added. The 2020 expansion Oakland Panthers, as well as the Cedar Rapids River Kings, Quad City Steamwheelers, and the San Diego Strike Force withdrew from the season due to the effects of the pandemic. On May 11, 2021, the IFL announced as broadcast partnership with Stadium to air the IFL Game of the Week beginning May 15, 2021. On June 14, the IFL terminated the Xtreme's membership after five games played due to failing to maintain the league's minimum obligations and did not finish the season.

==== 2022 season ====
On May 11, 2021, the IFL announced that Bill Foley and the Vegas Golden Knights had purchased a 2022 expansion franchise to be based in the Las Vegas Valley called the Vegas Knight Hawks. In October 2021, the league updated its website, removing the Cedar Rapids River Kings and Columbus Wild Dogs. On February 24, 2022, the Spokane Shock were removed from the league after the team lost its lease for their home arena.

2022 was the first year the IFL held its National Championship game at a neutral site being in Henderson, NV. The NAZ Wrangler who had a 1-13 record in 2021 turned around 2022 with a 12-4 record finishing ranked #2 in the Western Conference. Postseason First Round: Defeated Tucson Sugar Skulls 49–30 Semifinal: Defeated Arizona Rattlers 52–51 to become the Western Conference Champions IFL National Championship: Defeated Quad City Steamwheelers 47–45 Making NAZ Wranglers the 2022 National Champions.

==== 2023 season ====
On July 26, 2022, the IFL announced that Andy Scurto and the Tulsa Oilers had purchased a 2023 expansion franchise to be based in Tulsa, which would also be called the Tulsa Oilers. The Bay Area Panthers won the 2023 Championship defeating the Sioux Falls Storm 51–41 after going 1–15 in the previous year. On October 7, the Bismarck Bucks announced they will suspend operations for the 2023 season.

For the 2023 season, the league signed a player personnel partnership with the XFL, to function as their de facto minor league.

==== 2024 season ====
For the 2024 season, the league expanded to 16 teams with the addition of the Jacksonville Sharks and San Antonio Gunslingers from the National Arena League. The Sharks were added to the Eastern Conference and the Gunslingers were added to the Western Conference. While the Bismarck Bucks will stay idle for another season, the Scheels Arena will host the "Fargo-IFL Gridiron Classic" between Sioux Falls Storm and Massachusetts Pirates.

On October 24, 2023, the IFL announced that its first expansion team for 2025 would be based in Indianapolis and would play at the new Fishers Event Center in nearby Fishers. On December 15, the team announced they would be known as the Fishers Freight.

Starting in 2024, the league has a theme song for all games – "The Indoor War" by Sioux Falls-based musician Denham. The song was released on March 10, 2024.

==== 2025 season ====
On October 16, 2024, the IFL announced that the Duke City Gladiators and Frisco Fighters would sit out the 2025 season, both looking to return to play in 2026. The season schedule was announced on October 31, 2024.

On October 30, 2024, the Sioux Falls Storm announced they would sit out the 2025 season after their home arena did not renew the team's lease.

==== 2026 season ====
On August 22, 2025, the former Duke City Gladiators announced that they were returning to the IFL for the 2026 season under new ownership, rebranding as the New Mexico Chupacabras, moving back to Albuquerque and the Tingley Coliseum and hiring current Vegas Knight Hawks offensive line coach Kyle Moore-Brown as their new head coach.

On September 18, 2025, it was announced that the Bay Area Panthers were going dormant for the 2026 season and that the players were released as free agents

On October 18, 2025, the Massachusetts Pirates announced that they were "leaving Massachusetts" after seven seasons.

On November 17, 2025, the IFL website announced the Pirates moved to Orlando and will play in the 2026 season in the Kia Center.

== Teams ==
=== Current ===
For the 2025 season, the league was split into two conferences.

Overview of current Indoor Football League teams
| Conference | Team | Location | Arena | Capacity | Founded | Joined | Head coach |
|---|---|---|---|---|---|---|---|
| Eastern Conference | Arkansas Diamonds | Little Rock, Arkansas | Barton Coliseum | 7,150 | 2024 | 2026 | Bones Bagaunte |
| Eastern Conference | Athens Crush | Athens, Georgia | Akins Ford Arena | 5,600 | 2026 | 2027 | Rob Keefe |
| Eastern Conference | Fishers Freight | Fishers, Indiana | Fishers Event Center | 6,500 | 2023 | 2025 | Dixie Wooten |
| Eastern Conference | Green Bay Blizzard | Ashwaubenon, Wisconsin | Resch Center | 8,600 | 2003 | 2010 | Levi Nelson |
| Eastern Conference | Iowa Barnstormers | Des Moines, Iowa | Casey's Center | 15,181 | 1995 | 2015 | Andre Coles |
| Eastern Conference | Jacksonville Sharks | Jacksonville, Florida | VyStar Veterans Memorial Arena | 13,011 | 2009 | 2024 | Jason Gibson |
| Eastern Conference | Orlando Pirates | Orlando, Florida | Kia Center | 17,192 | 2017 | 2021; 2025 | Rod Windsor |
| Eastern Conference | Quad City Steamwheelers | Moline, Illinois | Vibrant Arena | 9,200 | 2017 | 2019 | Cory Ross |
| Eastern Conference | Savannah Leprechauns | Savannah, Georgia | Enmarket Arena | 6,800 | 2026 | 2027 | Clay Harrell |
| Western Conference | Arizona Rattlers | Glendale, Arizona | Desert Diamond Arena | 19,000 | 1992 | 2017 | Kevin Guy |
| Western Conference | New Mexico Chupacabras | Albuquerque, New Mexico | Tingley Coliseum | 11,571 | 2015 | 2020; 2026 | Corey Roberson |
| Western Conference | Northern Arizona Wranglers | Prescott Valley, Arizona | Findlay Toyota Center | 6,000 | 2020 | 2021 | Ron James |
| Western Conference | San Antonio Gunslingers | San Antonio, Texas | Freeman Coliseum | 9,800 | 2020 | 2024 | Billy Back |
| Western Conference | San Diego Strike Force | Oceanside, California | Frontwave Arena | 7,500 | 2018 | 2019 | Taylor Genuser |
| Western Conference | Tucson Sugar Skulls | Tucson, Arizona | Tucson Convention Center | 9,000 | 2018 | 2019 | Rayshaun Kizer |
| Western Conference | Tulsa Oilers | Tulsa, Oklahoma | BOK Center | 16,582 | 2022 | 2023 | Marvin Jones |
| Western Conference | Vegas Knight Hawks | Henderson, Nevada | Lee's Family Forum | 5,567 | 2021 | 2022 | Mike Davis |

=== Map of teams ===
Current IFL team locations (Eastern Conference teams in blue; Western Conference teams in red)

=== Former ===
- Abilene Ruff Riders – Left IFL after 2010 season for the Southern Indoor Football League and later folded in 2013.
- Alaska Wild – Team suspended operations nine games into the 2010 season. The coach and multiple players left to play elsewhere and the team no longer had money to continue the season.
- Amarillo Venom – Left IFL after 2011 season for the Lone Star Football League.
- Arctic Predators – Originally announced as 2010 IFL member, but stalemate between ownership group and head coach led to lease difficulties; IFL franchise moved and became the Kent Predators. (A different team with the same name [Arctic Predators] then became a member of the American Indoor Football Association.)
- Arizona Adrenaline – Ceased operations before the end of the 2011 season. Some games were played with a replacement team.
- Austin Turfcats – Folded following the 2010 season.
- Bay Area Panthers - Went dormant for the 2026 season, was slated to return for 2027, but wasn't included in divisional alignment.
- Billings Outlaws – Owner suspended the 2011 season and never returned.
- Billings Wolves – Owner could not find a buyer for the team after the 2016 season and did not return.
- Binghamton – Owner suspended the 2012 season and never returned.
- Bloomington Edge – Left IFL after 2012 season; rejoined the IFL for the 2018 season but was subsequently barred from playing in the IFL that season due to ligation over its departure from the CIF. Played an independent schedule in 2018 with the intent of rejoining the IFL in 2019, but were not included in the league schedule. In 2020 planned on joining the American Arena League, but lost out on the lease to the arena to another tenant and subsequently folded.
- Bricktown Brawlers – Ceased operations before the end of the 2011 season. Final games were played with a replacement team.
- Cedar Rapids Titans/River Kings – Played as the Titans from 2012 to 2018. Were sold and rebranded as the River Kings for the 2019 season and folded after the cancelled 2020 season. The team returned to play with the AIF in 2024 but became an independent team due to management issues.
- CenTex Barracudas – Originally announced as a 2009 IFL member but then was not included in 2009 alignment.
- Charlotte Speed – Originally intended to play during the 2013 IFL season but left for the PIFL instead.
- Cheyenne Warriors – Owner died shortly before 2013 season began and team suspended IFL operations prior to first season. They played a few games in the DIFL, and shutdown entirely in May 2013.
- Chicago Slaughter – Left IFL after 2013 season to join Continental Indoor Football League, but never played in it.
- Colorado Crush – Website shut down at the conclusion of the 2017 season after their owners, Project FANchise, left the league to start their own league.
- Columbus Wild Dogs – Announced in 2019 to begin play in 2021. The original ownership group, led by Steve Germain, cut ties with the team before the 2022 season and the team never launched.
- Corpus Christi Hammerheads – Left IFL after 2010 season for the Southern Indoor Football League.
- Dakota Bucks - Team went inactive in 2023 due to Workforce Safety Insurance issue. Changed name from Bismarck Bucks to Dakota Bucks in 2024 with intent of returning in 2025, determining a return to Bismarck or move to Fargo. Team was ultimately not included on the 2025 schedule.
- El Paso Generals – Owners attempted to sell the team after 2009 season and never returned.
- Everett Raptors – Team folded after 2012 season.
- Everett Destroyers – Originally announced as a 2009 IFL member but then was not included in 2009 alignment.
- Fairbanks Grizzlies – Owner suspended the 2012 season and never returned.
- Frisco Fighters - Team went dormant for 2025 season and was not included on 2026 league schedule.
- Frisco Thunder – Originally announced as 2009 IFL member but then announced they would take season off while Dr Pepper Arena was being renovated and never returned.
- La Crosse Spartans – Owners suspended the team and started the Cedar Rapids Titans. The team failed to find new ownership in 2011 and never returned.
- Lehigh Valley Steelhawks – Left IFL after 2012 season for the Professional Indoor Football League.
- Louisiana Swashbucklers – A member of the Intense Football League in 2008; left Indoor Football League prior to its inaugural season for the Southern Indoor Football League.
- Louisville Xtreme – Added for the 2021 season but membership was terminated by the league after five games played.
- Maryland Maniacs – Owner suspended the 2011 season and never returned.
- Minnesota Axemen – Membership terminated in 2015 by the league due to franchise's failure to meet league obligations.
- Minnesota Havok – Announced for 2016 season but were terminated by the league one month prior to the season for failure to reach minimum operational standards.
- New Mexico Stars – Left IFL after 2012 season for the Lone Star Football League.
- Nebraska Danger – Joined in 2011; owner put the team up for sale at the end of the 2019 season and did not find a buyer before the 2020 season.
- Omaha Beef – Left IFL after 2012 season for the Champions Professional Indoor Football League.
- Reading Express – Took 2013 season off and never returned.
- Richmond Revolution – Owner suspended the 2012 season and never returned.
- RiverCity Rage – Owner suspended the team to focus on the Omaha Beef.
- Rochester Raiders – Owner suspended the 2011 season and never returned.
- Saginaw Sting – Left for the Ultimate Indoor Football League after sitting out the 2010 season.
- Salt Lake Screaming Eagles – After Project FANchise left the IFL to start a new league, the Screaming Eagles were never able to secure new ownership.
- San Angelo Stampede Express – Owner suspended the 2011 season and never returned.
- Sioux City Bandits – Left IFL after 2010 season for the American Professional Football League.
- Sioux Falls Storm - Team went dormant after Denny Sanford Premier Center declined to offer a new lease agreement with the team. The Storm went dormant for 2025 hoping to have an arena solution for 2026, but ultimately was not resolved as they were excluded from the 2026 schedule.
- Spokane Empire – Owner suspended operations after the 2017 season and eventually reacquired the Spokane Shock brand. The Shock returned to the league in 2020.
- Spokane Shock – Returned for the cancelled 2020 season and played the 2021 season. Removed from league after the team lost its lease in prior to the 2022 season.
- Texas Draft – Originally planned to begin IFL play in 2027, but venue availability concerns and other operational considerations led them to shelve their debut.
- Texas Revolution – Left IFL after 2014 season, now defunct.
- Tri-Cities Fever – Team went dormant after the 2016 season with the franchise remaining in good standing with the IFL, but the current ownership has no plans for a return.
- Tucson Thunder Kats – Team joined the AIFA West before being officially accepted into the IFL but ended up suspending operations in November 2010 due to financial losses instead.
- West Michigan Ironmen – Attempted to join the IFL for the 2018 season from the CIF but was barred from joining. The team was sold in 2018 and the new ownership was announced as rejoining the CIF for 2019, but were not included for 2019 and instead joined Midwest Professional Indoor Football. As of 2025, they are members of American Indoor Football.
- West Michigan ThunderHawks – Owner suspended the 2011 season and never returned.
- Wenatchee Valley Venom – Owner suspended the 2012 season and never returned.
- West Texas Roughnecks – Left IFL after 2011 season for the Lone Star Football League.
- Wichita Falls Nighthawks – Left for Champions Indoor Football after the 2017 season but folded due to league disputes.
- Wichita Wild – Left IFL after the 2012 season, for the Champions Indoor Football League. Folded in 2014.
- Wyoming Cavalry – Owner ceased operations in September 2014.

== IFL National Championship ==
The IFL Championship Game (formerly the United Bowl) has been played every season since 2009. The current IFL champions are the Arizona Rattlers who won the championship game in 2026 defeating Green Bay Blizzard in Tucson.

The IFL continued to use the "United Bowl" name originally used by United Indoor Football. The UIF used this name before they merged with Intense Football League to form the Indoor Football League. The UIF held United Bowl I, II, III, and IV in 2005 through 2008, with all four being won by the Sioux Falls Storm. Although the name "National Indoor Bowl Championship" was used for the 2008 contest between the UIF and the Intense Football League, the "United Bowl" name was used for the combined league's championship instead up through 2021. Starting in the 2022 season the league started a three-year deal to play the now named IFL National Championship Game in the Lee's Family Forum (formerly the Dollar Loan Center) in Henderson, Nevada.

== Media ==
=== 2021 ===
On May 11, 2021, the IFL announced a national television partnership with Stadium, in which Stadium will air the IFL Game of The Week nationally each week for the rest of the season. The deal was negotiated by The Team Management, LLC, and each game will be produced exclusively by BEK Communications.

=== 2023 ===
In 2023, IFL announced a new broadcasting agreement with CBS Sports Network ensuring that the next three IFL National Championship games will air on the network. The deal also allows for additional games to be aired on CBS Sports Network throughout the agreement, although no extra games were ever pulled onto CBSSN.

=== 2025 ===
On March 12, 2025, the IFL announced the launch of IFL Network, a subscription streaming service that carried all of the IFL's games live online. The deal ended the IFL's practice of streaming the games for free on YouTube as it had in 2024. Some teams also held individual contracts with local or regional TV and radio channels.

=== 2026 ===
For the 2026 season, the IFL announced that FanDuel Sports Network's regional sports networks would broadcast half of the 2026 IFL Seasons games. The other half of games are slated to be streamed on Yahoo! Sports Network, a free ad-supported streaming television channel. In February 2026, after FanDuel Sports Networks' plans to close down were made public, the IFL announced that the FDSN deal would not be moving forward and that Yahoo! Sports Network had agreed to carry some additional games that would have been on FDSN, including the IFL National Championship. The rights to the remainder of the games were sold to Overnight Media Group, who paid a seven-figure sum for the rights to the league through 2028 and will once again make the games subscription-only. IFL Network will remain operational as a repository for highlights and all content except live games, with the paywall for that service being dropped.

== Hall of Fame ==
The Indoor Football League Hall of Fame is the official Hall of Fame of the IFL. The creation and inaugural class for this Hall was formed in 2014 and consisted of three inductees. All classes between 2014 and 2019 have consisted of three inductees which have contributed to the league in a significant way. There were no inductees for 2020; however, the 2021 class included four inductees. The Hall of Fame is the highest honor for players, coaches, and contributors involved in the IFL. The league was formed out of the merger of two indoor football leagues United Indoor Football and Intense Football League, which qualifies players who have also contributed at a high level to these former leagues prior to the merger. This Hall of Fame only incorporates contributors to the IFL, and its former leagues, so no other indoor or arena football leagues factor into the inductions. The Arena Football League has its own corresponding Hall of Fame. There is currently no physical location for the Indoor Football League Hall of Fame. Unlike the Pro Football Hall of Fame and Canadian Football Hall of Fame, there is no museum to view the inductees. Instead, it is more similar to the Arena Football Hall of Fame in that the inductees are enshrined online and without a physical location.

=== Qualifications ===
In order to be nominated for the Indoor Football League Hall of Fame, a candidate must have contributed in some significant fashion to be enshrined in the Hall. There is no official criteria that must be met other than the self-explained significant contributions to the league. Unlike other football Hall of Fames, the IFL Hall of Fame is far more new and laxed. To qualify, a member would need to significantly contribute to a franchise that played in the IFL, United Indoor Football, or Intense Football League during their tenure.

=== Ceremony and Hall of Fame Game ===
Starting with the 2021 season, the league added a new tradition of a Hall of Fame game. Similar to the Pro Football Hall of Fame Game, the first game of the season will now commemorate and recognize the hall of fame class for that year. Before this, the inductees were celebrated during the United Bowl championship game.

=== Inductees ===
Biographies and statistics can be referenced at the Hall of Fame web site.
| Inductee | Class | Position | Team(s) | Years |
|---|---|---|---|---|
| Tommy Benizio | 2014 | Commissioner, Owner, Co-founder | Odessa Roughnecks | 2004–2008 |
| Tommy Benizio | 2014 | Commissioner, Owner, Co-founder | Commissioner | 2008–2012 |
| Rich Roste | 2014 | Announcer | Sioux Falls Storm | 2000–2021 |
| Terrance Bryant | 2014 | Quarterback | Sioux Falls Storm | 2005–2010, 2013 |
| LaRon Council | 2015 | Running Back | La Crosse Spartans | 2011 |
| LaRon Council | 2015 | Running Back | Green Bay Blizzard | 2012 |
| LaRon Council | 2015 | Running Back | Cedar Rapids Titans | 2013–2014 |
| Chris Dixon | 2015 | Quarterback | Black Hills Red Dogs | 2005 |
| Chris Dixon | 2015 | Quarterback | Billings Mavericks/ Outlaws | 2005–2010 |
| Chris Dixon | 2015 | Quarterback | Sioux Falls Storm | 2011–2012, 2014, 2019 |
| B. J. Hill | 2015 | Defensive back/Kick return | Green Bay Blizzard | 2010–2013, 2018–2019 |
| Mark Blackburn | 2016 | Linebacker | Sioux Falls Storm | 2003–2010 |
| Lionell Singleton | 2016 | Defensive back | Tri-Cities Fever | 2010–2015 |
| Tom Wigley | 2016 | Owner | Colorado Ice/ Crush | 2010–2016 |
| Robert Fuller | 2017 | Head coach | Omaha Beef | 2005–2006 |
| Robert Fuller | 2017 | Head coach | Fairbanks Grizzlies | 2011 |
| Robert Fuller | 2017 | Head coach | Green Bay Blizzard | 2012–2013 |
| Robert Fuller | 2017 | Head coach | Bemidji Axemen | 2014 |
| Cory Johnsen | 2017 | Defensive lineman | Sioux Falls Storm | 2006–2015 |
| James Terry | 2017 | Wide receiver | Sioux Falls Storm | 2006–2015 |
| Pig Brown | 2018 | Linebacker | RiverCity Rage | 2009 |
| Pig Brown | 2018 | Linebacker | Nebraska Danger | 2012–2015 |
| Charlie Sanders | 2018 | Offensive lineman | Billings Outlaws | 2010 |
| Charlie Sanders | 2018 | Offensive lineman | Sioux Falls Storm | 2011–2016 |
| Jameel Sewell | 2018 | Quarterback | Green Bay Blizzard | 2011 |
| Jameel Sewell | 2018 | Quarterback | Nebraska Danger | 2012–2016 |
| Javicz Jones | 2019 | Linebacker | Texas Revolution | 2014 |
| Javicz Jones | 2019 | Linebacker | Iowa Barnstormers | 2015–2017 |
| Myniya Smith | 2019 | Offensive lineman | Billings Outlaws | 2009–2010 |
| Myniya Smith | 2019 | Offensive lineman | Sioux Falls Storm | 2011–2017 |
| Bryan Pray | 2019 | Wide receiver | West Michigan ThunderHawks | 2010 |
| Bryan Pray | 2019 | Wide receiver | La Crosse Spartans | 2011 |
| Bryan Pray | 2019 | Wide receiver | Green Bay Blizzard | 2012 |
| Bryan Pray | 2019 | Wide receiver | Ceder Rapids Titans | 2013–2015 |
| Bryan Pray | 2019 | Wide receiver | Iowa Barnstormers | 2016 |
| Bryan Pray | 2019 | Wide receiver | Spokane Empire | 2017 |
| Fred Jackson | 2021 | Running back | Sioux City Bandits | 2004–2005 |
| Heron O'Neal | 2021 | Head coach | Billings Outlaws | 2006–2010 |
| Heron O'Neal | 2021 | Head coach | Colorado Ice/ Crush | 2012–2016 |
| John Pettit | 2021 | General manager/vice president | Iowa Barnstormers | 2008–2020 |
| Kurtiss Riggs | 2021 | Head coach | Sioux Falls Storm | 2003–2023 |
| Charlie Bosselman | 2022 | Owner | Nebraska Danger | 2010–2019 |
| Nate Fluit | 2022 | Defensive lineman | Sioux Falls Storm | 2003–2007 |
| Carl Sims | 2022 | Wide receiver | Bloomington Extreme | 2009 |
| Carl Sims | 2022 | Wide receiver | Sioux City Bandits | 2010 |
| Carl Sims | 2022 | Wide receiver | Billings Outlaws | 2010 |
| Carl Sims | 2022 | Wide receiver | Sioux Falls Storm | 2011–2012 |
| Carl Sims | 2022 | Wide receiver | Cedar Rapids Titans | 2013–2015 |
| Carl Sims | 2022 | Wide receiver | Billings Wolves | 2015 |
| Carl Sims | 2022 | Wide receiver | Green Bay Blizzard | 2015 |
| Carl Sims | 2022 | Wide receiver | Spokane Empire | 2016–2017 |
| Carl Sims | 2022 | Wide receiver | Nebraska Danger | 2017 |
| Parker Douglass | 2023 | Kicker | Sioux Falls Storm | 2009–2021 |
| Xzavie Jackson | 2023 | Defensive lineman | RiverCity Rage | 2009 |
| Xzavie Jackson | 2023 | Defensive lineman | La Crosse Spartans | 2010–2011 |
| Xzavie Jackson | 2023 | Defensive lineman | Cedar Rapids Titans | 2012–2016 |
| Xzavie Jackson | 2023 | Defensive lineman | Nebraska Danger | 2017–2018 |
| Tyler Knight | 2023 | Linebacker | Arkansas Diamonds | 2010 |
| Tyler Knight | 2023 | Linebacker | Sioux Falls Storm | 2011, 2013–2017 |
| Houston Lillard | 2024 | Quarterback | Tri-Cities Fever | 2010–2014 |
| Clinton Solomon | 2024 | Wide receiver | Wichita Wild | 2009–2011 |
| Clinton Solomon | 2024 | Wide receiver | Sioux Falls Storm | 2012–2013 |
| Clinton Solomon | 2024 | Wide receiver | Texas Revolution | 2014, 2016 |
| Todd Tryon | 2024 | Owner, Commissioner | Sioux Falls Storm | 2010–2019 |
| Todd Tryon | 2024 | Owner, Commissioner | Commissioner | 2019–present |

== Awards ==
=== Most Valuable Player ===
The Indoor Football League Most Valuable Player award, or simply the IFL MVP, is presented annually by the IFL to a player adjudged to have been the most valuable in that year's regular season. The first award was named the Adam Pringle Most Valuable Player award before the IFL announced the Adam Pringle Award in 2010.

Key for the below tables
| Symbol | Description |
|---|---|
| † | Player elected to the IFL Hall of Fame |

IFL Most Valuable Player award winners
| Year | Winner | Team | Position | Ref. |
|---|---|---|---|---|
| 2009 | Chris Dixon^{†} | Billings Outlaws | Quarterback | |
| 2010 | Bryan Randall | Richmond Revolution | Quarterback (2) | |
| 2011 | Chris Dixon^{†} (2) | Sioux Falls Storm | Quarterback (3) | |
| 2012 | Chris Dixon^{†} (3) | Sioux Falls Storm (2) | Quarterback (4) | |
| 2013 | Jameel Sewell^{†} | Nebraska Danger | Quarterback (5) | |
| 2014 | Willie Copeland | Colorado Crush | Quarterback (6) | |
| 2015 | Jameel Sewell^{†} (2) | Nebraska Danger (2) | Quarterback (7) | |
| 2016 | Charles McCullum | Wichita Falls Nighthawks | Quarterback (8) | |
| 2017 | Charles McCullum (2) | Wichita Falls Nighthawks (2) | Quarterback (9) | |
| 2018 | Drew Powell | Iowa Barnstormers | Quarterback (10) | |
| 2019 | Daquan Neal | Iowa Barnstormers (2) | Quarterback (11) | |
| 2021 | Drew Powell (2) | Arizona Rattlers | Quarterback (12) | |
| 2022 | Drew Powell (3) | Arizona Rattlers (2) | Quarterback (13) | |
| 2023 | T. J. Edwards | Frisco Fighters | Quarterback (14) | |
| 2024 | Ja'Rome Johnson | Vegas Knight Hawks | Quarterback (15) | |
| 2025 | Max Meylor | Green Bay Blizzard | Quarterback (16) | |
| 2026 | Liam Thompson | Green Bay Blizzard | Quarterback(17) | |

=== Offensive Player of the Year ===
The Indoor Football League Offensive Player of the Year Award is given annually by the IFL to the offensive player of the IFL believed to have had the most outstanding season. Chris Dixon has won the most awards with four. Sam Castronova has won the most recent award in 2024.

Key
| ^ | Denotes year in which a player also won IFL MVP |

| Season | Player | Team | Position | Ref |
|---|---|---|---|---|
| 2009 | Chris Dixon | Billings Outlaws | Quarterback | |
| 2010 | Ben Sankey | Omaha Beef | Quarterback | |
| 2011 | Chris Dixon (2) | Sioux Falls Storm | Quarterback | |
| 2012 | Chris Dixon (3) | Sioux Falls Storm (2) | Quarterback | |
| 2013 | Jameel Sewell | Nebraska Danger | Quarterback | |
| 2014 | Chris Dixon (4) | Sioux Falls Storm (3) | Quarterback | |
| 2015 | Steven Whitehead | Tri-Cities Fever | Wide receiver | |
| 2016 | Demarius Washington | Colorado Crush | Wide receiver | |
| 2017 | Charles McCullum | Wichita Falls Nighthawks | Quarterback | |
| 2018 | Darrell Monroe | Arizona Rattlers | Running back | |
| 2019 | E.J. Hilliard | Quad City Steamwheelers | Quarterback | |
| 2021 | Nate Davis | Duke City Gladiators | Quarterback | |
| 2022 | E.J. Hilliard (2) | Quad City Steamwheelers (2) | Quarterback | |
| 2023 | Drew Powell | Arizona Rattlers (2) | Quarterback | |
| 2024 | Sam Castronova | San Antonio Gunslingers | Quarterback | |
| 2025 | Josh Tomas | Bay Area Panthers | Running back | |

=== Coach of the Year ===
The Indoor Football League Coach of the Year award, is presented annually by the IFL to a head coach adjudged to have had the most outstanding season.

Key for the below tables
| Symbol | Description |
|---|---|
| Winner (#) | Denotes number of times the coach has won the award |
| * | Team won IFL National Championship the same year the recipient won the award |
| † | Coach elected to the IFL Hall of Fame |

IFL Coach of the Year award winners
| Year | Winner | Team | Record | Ref. |
|---|---|---|---|---|
| 2009 | Brian Brents | El Paso Generals | 12–2 | |
| 2010 | Steve Criswell | Richmond Revolution | 13–1 | |
| 2011 | Robert Fuller^{†} | Fairbanks Grizzlies | 10–4 | |
| 2012 | Robert Fuller^{†} (2) | Green Bay Blizzard | 11–3 | |
| 2013 | Mark Stoute | Cedar Rapids Titans | 9–5 | |
| 2014 | Heron O'Neal^{†} | Colorado Ice | 10–4 | |
| 2015 | Kurtiss Riggs^{†} | Sioux Falls Storm* | 14–0 | |
| 2016 | Billy Back | Wichita Falls Nighthawks | 11–5 | |
| 2017 | Dixie Wooten | Iowa Barnstormers | 13–3 | |
| 2018 | Dixie Wooten (2) | Iowa Barnstormers* | 11–3 | |
| 2019 | Corey Roberson | Green Bay Blizzard | 9–5 | |
| 2021 | Kevin Guy | Arizona Rattlers | 12–2 | |
| 2022 | Les Moss | Northern Arizona Wranglers* | 12–4 | |
| 2023 | Hurtis Chinn | Tucson Sugar Skulls | 9–6 | |
| 2024 | Corey Roberson (2) | Green Bay Blizzard | 13–3 | |
| 2025 | Cory Ross | Quad City Steamwheelers | 11–5 | |

=== Franchise of the Year ===
The Indoor Football League Franchise of the Year award is presented annually by the IFL to the team adjudged to have had the best overall game day operations, media relations, and on-field performance in that year's regular season.

Key for the below tables
| Symbol | Description |
|---|---|
| * | Team won IFL National Championship |
| † | Coach won IFL Coach of the Year Award |

IFL Franchise of the Year award winners
| Year | Team | Coach | Record | Ref. |
|---|---|---|---|---|
| 2009 | Wichita Wild | Ken Matous | 8–6 | |
| 2010 | Richmond Revolution | Steve Criswell^{†} | 13–1 | |
| 2011 | Green Bay Blizzard | Rik Richards | 11–3 | |
| 2012 | Tri-Cities Fever | Teri Carr | 12–2 | |
| 2013 | Nebraska Danger | Mike Davis | 10–4 | |
| 2014 | Cedar Rapids Titans | Mark Stoute | 11–3 | |
| 2015 | Tri-Cities Fever | Teri Carr | 8–6 | |
| 2016 | Sioux Falls Storm* | Kurtiss Riggs | 15–1 | |
| 2017 | Arizona Rattlers* | Kevin Guy | 12–4 | |
| 2018 | Green Bay Blizzard | Corey Roberson (Note: In 2018, Chris Williams served as the Green Bay Blizzard's head coach until he was fired on March 29 after starting the season 0–5. Corey Roberson took over as the interim head coach.) | 2–12 | |
| 2019 | Arizona Rattlers | Kevin Guy | 14–0 | |
| 2021 | Arizona Rattlers | Kevin Guy^{†} | 12–2 | |
| 2022 | Quad City Steamwheelers | Cory Ross | 9–7 | |
| 2023 | Green Bay Blizzard | Corey Roberson | 7–8 | |
| 2024 | Green Bay Blizzard | Corey Roberson^{†} | 13–3 | |
| 2025 | Tulsa Oilers | Marvin Jones | 10-6 | |

== See also ==
- National Professional Soccer League (1984–2001)
- World Indoor Soccer League (1998-2001)
- Major Indoor Soccer League (2001–2008)
