= 2013 United Bowl =

Nebraska Danger	Sioux Falls Storm
(11–4)	(11–4)
Intense	United
40	43
Head coach: Mike Davis	Head coach: Kurtiss Riggs
	1	2	3	4	Total
Nebraska	3	20	4	13	40
Sioux Falls	7	17	9	10	43
- Date: June 29, 2013
- Stadium: Sioux Falls Arena
- Location: Sioux Falls, South Dakota, U.S.
- MVP: Sioux Falls QB Terrance Bryant
- Referee: Patrick St. John
- Attendance: 5,202

The 2013 United Bowl was the fifth title game of the Indoor Football League (IFL). It was played on June 29, 2013, at the Sioux Falls Arena in Sioux Falls, South Dakota. The top seed in the United Conference, the Sioux Falls Storm, defeated the top seed in the Intense Conference—the Nebraska Danger—by a score of 43–40.

== Road to the United Bowl ==
2013 Intense Conference
	W	L	T	PCT	PF	PA	DIV	GB	STK
y - Nebraska Danger	10	4	0	0.714	767	655	5-2	0.0	W4
x - Colorado Ice	9	5	0	0.643	651	579	5-3	1.0	L1
Tri-Cities Fever	6	8	0	0.429	626	591	4-4	4.0	W1
Wyoming Cavalry	1	13	0	0.071	433	754	1-7	9.0	L9

2013 United Conference
	W	L	T	PCT	PF	PA	DIV	GB	STK
y - Sioux Falls Storm	10	4	0	.714	645	500	4-2	0.0	W3
x - Cedar Rapids Titans	9	5	0	.643	744	569	6-4	1.0	w2
Chicago Slaughter	9	5	0	.643	598	602	6-5	1.0	W2
Texas Revolution	5	9	0	.357	563	747	3-4	6.0	L2
Green Bay Blizzard	4	10	0	.286	622	652	2-6	6.0	L5

Conference Championships
1	Sioux Falls	44
2	Cedar Rapids	20
United Conference; Intense Conference
1	Nebraska	55
2	Colorado	50

2013 United Bowl
U1	Sioux Falls	43
I1	Nebraska	40
