= 2013 Indoor Football League season =

2013 IFL season
- League: Indoor Football League
- Sport: Indoor Football
- Duration: February 15, 2013 – June 15, 2013
- Teams: 9

Regular season
- Season MVP: Jameel Sewell

Playoffs
- Intense champions: Nebraska Danger
- Intense runners-up: Colorado Ice
- United champions: Sioux Falls Storm
- United runners-up: Cedar Rapids Titans

2013 United Bowl Championship
- Champions: Sioux Falls Storm
- Runners-up: Nebraska Danger
- Finals MVP: Terrence Bryant

IFL seasons
- ← 2012 2014 →

The 2013 Indoor Football League season was the fifth season of the Indoor Football League (IFL). Playing with nine teams in two conferences spread across the United States, the league's regular season kicked off on February 15, 2013, when the Sioux Falls Storm beat the Green Bay Blizzard 64–41. The season ended on June 15, 2013, with the visiting Sioux Falls Storm defeating the Texas Revolution 52-38.

== Teams ==
For 2013, the IFL maintained its two-conference no-divisions format with each team scheduled to play 14 games during the 16-week regular season. The league contracted from 16 teams to just nine with the Bloomington Edge, Lehigh Valley Steelhawks, Omaha Beef, Reading Express, Everett Raptors, New Mexico Stars, and Wichita Wild either folding, hibernating, or moving to a different league. A new team, the Cheyenne Warriors, were expected to join the league for 2013 until the death of the team's owner in late December 2012; the team subsequently became inactive. The Texas-based Allen Wranglers changed ownership and became the Texas Revolution.

=== United Conference ===
Team	Location	Arena (Capacity)
Cedar Rapids Titans	Cedar Rapids, Iowa	Cedar Rapids Ice Arena (4,000)
Chicago Slaughter	Hoffman Estates, Illinois	Sears Centre (9,500)
Green Bay Blizzard	Ashwaubenon, Wisconsin	Resch Center (8,621)
Sioux Falls Storm	Sioux Falls, South Dakota	Sioux Falls Arena (4,700)
Texas Revolution	Allen, Texas	Allen Event Center (6,275)

=== Intense Conference ===
Team	Location	Arena (Capacity)
Colorado Ice	Loveland, Colorado	Budweiser Events Center (7,200)
Nebraska Danger	Grand Island, Nebraska	Eihusen Arena (7,500)
Tri-Cities Fever	Kennewick, Washington	Toyota Center (5,970)
Wyoming Cavalry	Casper, Wyoming	Casper Events Center (8,395)

== Personnel ==
Robert Loving served as interim commissioner of the IFL in 2012 after Tommy Benizio left mid-season to pursue other opportunities. Benizio became president of the Texas Revolution, an IFL franchise based in Allen, Texas. Loving was officially named as the IFL's commissioner by the league's board of directors during the 2012 annual league meetings.

For 2013, Michael Allshouse was Director of Football Operations, Sean Whitmire was Director of Communications/Team Services, and Tom Falcinelli was the Director of Officiating.

== Standings ==
2013 Intense Conference
	W	L	T	PCT	PF	PA	DIV	GB	STK
y - Nebraska Danger	10	4	0	0.714	767	655	5-2	0.0	W4
x - Colorado Ice	9	5	0	0.643	651	579	5-3	1.0	L1
Tri-Cities Fever	6	8	0	0.429	626	591	4-4	4.0	W1
Wyoming Cavalry	1	13	0	0.071	433	754	1-7	9.0	L9

2013 United Conference
	W	L	T	PCT	PF	PA	DIV	GB	STK
y - Sioux Falls Storm	10	4	0	.714	645	500	4-2	0.0	W3
x - Cedar Rapids Titans	9	5	0	.643	744	569	6-4	1.0	w2
Chicago Slaughter	9	5	0	.643	598	602	6-5	1.0	W2
Texas Revolution	5	9	0	.357	563	747	3-4	6.0	L2
Green Bay Blizzard	4	10	0	.286	622	652	2-6	6.0	L5

== Playoffs ==
Conference Championships
2	Colorado	50
1	Nebraska	55
Intense Conference; United Conference
2	Cedar Rapids	20
1	Sioux Falls	44

2013 United Bowl
I1	Nebraska	40
U1	Sioux Falls	43

== Awards ==
=== Individual season awards ===
Award	Winner	Position	Team
Most Valuable Player	Jameel Sewell	Quarterback	Nebraska Danger
Offensive Player of the Year	Jameel Sewell	Quarterback	Nebraska Danger
Defensive Player of the Year	Ross Cochran	Linebacker	Wyoming Cavalry
Special Teams Player of the Year	B. J. Hill	Kick returner	Green Bay Blizzard
Rookie of the Year	Cody Kirby	Quarterback	Chicago Slaughter
Adam Pringle Award	Lionell Singleton	Defensive back	Tri-Cities Fever
Coach of the Year	Mark Stoute	Head coach	Cedar Rapids Titans

=== 1st Team All-IFL ===
Offense
Quarterback	Jameel Sewell, Nebraska
Running back	LaRon Council, Cedar Rapids
Wide receiver	Kayne Farquharson, Nebraska; Carl Sims, Cedar Rapids; Kyle Kaiser, Colorado
Offensive tackle	Myniya Smith, Sioux Falls; Darius Savage, Nebraska
Center	Charlie Sanders, Sioux Falls

Defense
Defensive line	Xzavie Jackson, Cedar Rapids; Rachman Crable, Sioux Falls; Gabe Knapton, Colorado
Linebacker	Ross Cochran, Wyoming; Ameer Ismail, Chicago
Defensive back	Lionell Singleton, Tri-Cities; Rudell Crim, Tri-Cities; Frankie Solomon, Jr., Texas

Special teams
Kicker	Parker Douglass, Sioux Falls
Kick returner	B. J. Hill, Green Bay

=== 2nd Team All-IFL ===
Offense
Quarterback	Cody Kirby, Chicago
Running back	Daniel DuFrene, Chicago
Wide receiver	Ryan Balentine, Green Bay; Bryan Pray, Cedar Rapids; Troy Evans, Wyoming
Offensive tackle	Jason Baksas, Chicago; Michael Trice, Colorado
Center	Maurice Robinson, Cedar Rapids

Defense
Defensive end	Jeremiah Price, Sioux Falls; P. J. South, Chicago; Michael Stover, Colorado
Linebacker	Maurice Simpkins, Nebraska; Elijah Fields, Green Bay
Defensive back	Roy Polite, Sioux Falls; Ricky Johnson, Cedar Rapids; Jovan Jackson, Colorado

Special teams
Kicker	Joe Houston, Nebraska
