= 2015 United Bowl =

Nebraska Danger	Sioux Falls Storm
(11–4)	(15–0)
Intense	United
27	62
Head coach: Mike Davis	Head coach: Kurtiss Riggs
	1	2	3	4	Total
Nebraska	7	10	10	0	27
Sioux Falls	7	17	24	14	62
- Date: July 11, 2015
- Stadium: Denny Sanford PREMIER Center
- Location: Sioux Falls, South Dakota, U.S.
- MVP: Sioux Falls WR Brandon Johnson-Farrell
- Referee: Patrick St. John
- Attendance: 9,245

The 2015 United Bowl was the seventh title game of the Indoor Football League (IFL). It was played on July 11, 2015, at the Denny Sanford PREMIER Center in Sioux Falls, South Dakota. The highest seed in the United Conference was the Sioux Falls Storm, who defeated the highest seed in the Intense Conference, the Nebraska Danger, 62–27.

The Storm won their fifth consecutive IFL title.

== Road to the United Bowl ==
2015 Intense Conference
	W	L	T	PCT	PF	PA	GB	STK
y-Nebraska Danger	10	4	0	.714	739	636	--	L1
x-Tri-Cities Fever	8	6	0	.571	648	655	2.0	W1
Colorado Ice	6	8	0	.429	658	666	4.0	W3
Billings Wolves	5	9	0	.357	638	663	5.0	W1
Wichita Falls Nighthawks	4	10	0	.286	546	615	6.0	L5

2015 United Conference
	W	L	T	PCT	PF	PA	GB	STK
y-Sioux Falls Storm	14	0	0	1.000	884	481	--	W14
x-Cedar Rapids Titans	9	5	0	.643	642	487	5.0	L1
Green Bay Blizzard	6	8	0	.429	620	715	8.0	L3
Iowa Barnstormers	6	8	0	.429	528	631	8.0	W1
Bemidji Axemen	2	12	0	.143	449	803	12.0	L10

Conference Championships
1	Sioux Falls	34
2	Cedar Rapids	12
1	Nebraska	86
2	Tri-Cities	43

2015 United Bowl
U1	Sioux Falls	62
I1	Nebraska	27
