= 2013 Tri-Cities Fever season =

Indoor Football League team season

- Owner: Teri Carr
- General manager: Teri Carr
- Head coach: Adam Shackleford
- Home stadium: Toyota Center; 7016 West Grandridge Blvd. Kennewick, WA 99336

Results
- Record: 6–8
- Conference place: 3rd Intense

The 2013 Tri-Cities Fever season was the team's ninth season as a professional indoor football franchise and its fourth in the Indoor Football League (IFL). One of nine teams competing in the IFL for the 2013 season, the Kennewick, Washington-based Tri-Cities Fever were members of the Intense Conference. Founded in 2005 as part of the National Indoor Football League, the Tri-Cities Fever moved to the af2 in 2007, then jumped to the IFL before the 2010 season.

Under the leadership of owner/general manager Teri Carr and head coach Adam Shackleford, the team played their home games at the Toyota Center in Kennewick, Washington. Shackleford's staff included assistant coach Cleveland Pratt and defensive line coach Kimo von Oelhoffen. The Fever Girls were the official dance team.

== Schedule ==
Key: Win Tie Loss Bye

=== Regular season ===
All start times are local time

Week	Day	Date	Kickoff	Opponent	Results		Location
Week	Day	Date	Kickoff	Opponent	Score	Record	Location
1	BYE						
2	BYE						
3	Friday	March 1	7:00pm	at Colorado Ice	L 38–42	0–1	Budweiser Events Center
4	BYE						
5	Friday	March 15	7:05pm	Nebraska Danger	W 44–31	1–1	Toyota Center
6	Friday	March 22	7:05pm	at Texas Revolution	L 37–40	1–2	Allen Event Center
7	Friday	March 29	7:05pm	Texas Revolution	L 43–54	1–3	Toyota Center
8	Friday	April 5	7:05pm	at Wyoming Cavalry	L 34–36	1–4	Casper Events Center
9	Saturday	April 12	7:05pm	Sioux Falls Storm	L 43–56	1–5	Toyota Center
10	Saturday	April 20	7:00pm	at Green Bay Blizzard	L 54–66	1–6	Resch Center
11	Friday	April 26	7:05pm	Wyoming Cavalry	W 57–31	2–6	Toyota Center
12	Saturday	May 4	7:05pm	Cedar Rapids Titans	W 70–68	3–6	Toyota Center
13	Saturday	May 11	7:15pm	at Wyoming Cavalry	W 33–16	4–6	Casper Events Center
14	Saturday	May 18	6:00pm	at Colorado Ice	L 35–39	4–7	Budweiser Events Center
15	Saturday	May 25	7:05pm	Colorado Ice	W 41–37	5–7	Toyota Center
16	BYE						
17	Saturday	June 8	7:05pm	Wyoming Cavalry	W 33–6	6–7	Casper Events Center
18	Saturday	June 15	7:05pm	at Nebraska Danger	L 64–69	6–8	Eihusen Arena

== Roster ==
2013 Tri-Cities Fever roster
Quarterbacks: 7 Kasey Peters; 5 Dante Warren; Running backs: 6 Keola Antolin; 24 Keithon Flemming; Wide receivers: 17 George Bell; 3 Ed Berry; 15 Jackie Chambers; 19 Ryan Lincoln	Offensive linemen: 60 Keshawn Carrington; 57 Andrew Faaumu; 76 Tavaris Jeffries; 99 Ryan Tolar; 79 Trevon Williams; Defensive linemen: 93 Brandon Rankin; 13 Malcolm Riley	Linebackers: 44 Boris Lee; 27 Brandon Wilson; Defensive backs: 6 Donyaé Coleman; 21 Rudell Crim; 1 Dennis Rogan; 2 Lionell Singleton; 20 Gary Wilburn; Kickers: 8 Brady Beeson	Injured reserve: 19 Dejuan Miller WR (IR); Exempt list: Currently vacant; Rookies in italics Roster updated June 15, 2013; 23 Active, 1 Inactive

== Standings ==
2013 Intense Conference
	W	L	T	PCT	PF	PA	DIV	GB	STK
y - Nebraska Danger	10	4	0	0.714	767	655	5-2	0.0	W4
x - Colorado Ice	9	5	0	0.643	651	579	5-3	1.0	L1
Tri-Cities Fever	6	8	0	0.429	626	591	4-4	4.0	W1
Wyoming Cavalry	1	13	0	0.071	433	754	1-7	9.0	L9
