= 2015 Indoor Football League season =

2015 IFL season
- League: Indoor Football League
- Sport: Indoor Football
- Duration: February 28, 2015 – June 20, 2015
- Teams: 10

Regular season
- Season MVP: Jameel Sewell (Nebraska)

Playoffs
- Intense champions: Nebraska Danger
- Intense runners-up: Tri-Cities Fever
- United champions: Sioux Falls Storm
- United runners-up: Cedar Rapids Titans

2015 United Bowl Championship
- Champions: Sioux Falls Storm
- Runners-up: Nebraska Danger

IFL seasons
- ← 2014 2016 →

The 2015 Indoor Football League season was the seventh season of the Indoor Football League. Playing with ten teams in two conferences located in mid-sized cities predominantly in the central United States, the league's regular season kicked off on February 28, 2015, when the reigning league champion Sioux Falls Storm travelled to the Bemidji Axemen. The regular season ended 16 weeks later on June 20, 2015, with the Green Bay Blizzard visiting the Iowa Barnstormers. The playoffs were held in two rounds with the top two teams in each conference facing off in a conference championship game followed by the winners of those games meeting in the United Bowl.

== Teams ==
For 2015, the IFL maintained its two-conference no-divisions format with each of 10 teams played 14 games during the 16-week regular season. This is the one more teams than the number of teams as played in the 2014 IFL season. The Texas-based Wichita Falls Nighthawks expansion team replaced the Texas Revolution which left for Champions Indoor Football for the 2015 season. The Iowa Barnstormers joined the IFL from the Arena Football League after making a move due to easier regional travel. The Wyoming Cavalry folded, and the league accepted the expansion franchise of Billings Wolves and the Wichita Falls Nighthawks.

=== United Conference ===
Team	Location	Arena (Capacity)
Bemidji Axemen	Bemidji, Minnesota	Sanford Center (4,700)
Cedar Rapids Titans	Cedar Rapids, Iowa	U.S. Cellular Center (6,900)
Green Bay Blizzard	Ashwaubenon, Wisconsin	Resch Center (8,621)
Iowa Barnstormers	Des Moines, Iowa	Wells Fargo Arena (15,181)
Sioux Falls Storm	Sioux Falls, South Dakota	Sioux Falls Arena (4,700)

=== Intense Conference ===
Team	Location	Arena (Capacity)
Billings Wolves	Billings, Montana	Rimrock Auto Arena at MetraPark (12,000)
Colorado Ice	Loveland, Colorado	Budweiser Events Center (7,200)
Nebraska Danger	Grand Island, Nebraska	Eihusen Arena (7,500)
Tri-Cities Fever	Kennewick, Washington	Toyota Center (5,970)
Wichita Falls Nighthawks	Wichita Falls, Texas	Kay Yeager Coliseum (7,380)

== Expansion ==
In January 2014, the league announced that the Billings Wolves would join the league for the 2015 season. The Wolves played their home games at Rimrock Auto Arena at MetraPark in Billings, Montana. The city was previously home to the Billings Outlaws, who folded after a tornado heavily damaged the arena leaving them with heavy, uninsured losses.

On August 25, 2014, the Nighthawks became official members of the Indoor Football League.

== Standings ==
2015 Intense Conference
	W	L	T	PCT	PF	PA	GB	STK
y-Nebraska Danger	10	4	0	.714	739	636	--	L1
x-Tri-Cities Fever	8	6	0	.571	648	655	2.0	W1
Colorado Ice	6	8	0	.429	658	666	4.0	W3
Billings Wolves	5	9	0	.357	638	663	5.0	W1
Wichita Falls Nighthawks	4	10	0	.286	546	615	6.0	L5

2015 United Conference
	W	L	T	PCT	PF	PA	GB	STK
y-Sioux Falls Storm	14	0	0	1.000	884	481	--	W14
x-Cedar Rapids Titans	9	5	0	.643	642	487	5.0	L1
Green Bay Blizzard	6	8	0	.429	620	715	8.0	L3
Iowa Barnstormers	6	8	0	.429	528	631	8.0	W1
Bemidji Axemen	2	12	0	.143	449	803	12.0	L10

== Playoffs ==
Conference Championships
2	Tri-Cities	43
1	Nebraska	86
2	Cedar Rapids	12
1	Sioux Falls	34

2015 United Bowl
I1	Nebraska	27
U1	Sioux Falls	62

== Awards ==
=== Individual season awards ===
Award	Winner	Position	Team
Most Valuable Player	Jameel Sewell	Quarterback	Nebraska Danger
Offensive Player of the Year	Steven Whitehead	Wide Receiver	Tri-Cities Fever
Defensive Player of the Year	Jeremiah Price	Defensive Lineman	Cedar Rapids Titans
Special Teams Player of the Year	Mulku Kalokoh	Kick returner	Bemidji Axemen
Offensive Rookie of the Year	Waymon James	Running Back	Nebraska Danger
Defensive Rookie of the Year	Michael Green	Defensive Back	Billings Wolves
Adam Pringle Award	Brady Beeson	Kicker	Tri-Cities Fever
Coach of the Year	Kurtiss Riggs	Head coach	Sioux Falls Storm
Executive of the Year	John Pettit	VP, COO and Co-owner	Iowa Barnstormers

=== 1st Team All-IFL ===
Offense
Quarterback	Jameel Sewell, Nebraska
Running back	Waymon James, Nebraska
Wide receiver	Judd Harrold, Sioux Falls; Steven Whitehead, Tri-Cities; Kyle Kaiser, Colorado
Offensive tackle	Myniya Smith, Sioux Falls; Darius Savage, Nebraska
Center	Charlie Sanders, Sioux Falls

Defense
Defensive line	Jeremiah Price, Cedar Rapids; Corey Johnsen, Sioux Falls; Xzavie Jackson, Cedar Rapids
Linebacker	Javicz Jones, Iowa; James Ackel, Wichita Falls
Defensive back	Michael Green, Billings; DeQuan Starling, Sioux Falls; Jamie Bender, Green Bay

Special teams
Kicker	Jeff Budzien, Green Bay
Kick returner	Mulku Kalokoh, Bemidji

=== 2nd Team All-IFL ===
Offense
Quarterback	Donovan Porterie, Green Bay
Running back	Andrew Pierce, Tri-Cities
Wide receiver	Brady Roland, Iowa; Josh Jarboe, Bemidji; Bryan Pray, Cedar Rapids
Offensive tackle	Rashaud Mungro, Sioux Falls; Trevis Turner, Nebraska
Center	Keyun Swinney, Green Bay

Defense
Defensive end	Jake Killeen, Tri-Cities; Terrance Lloyd, Wichita Falls; Justin Edison, Nebraska
Linebacker	Tyler Knight, Sioux Falls; Elijah Fields, Sioux Falls
Defensive back	Troy Sanders, Tri-Cities; Corey Sample, Colorado; Travonti Johnson, Billings

Special teams
Kicker	Rockne Belmonte, Cedar Rapids
Kick returner	Demetruce McNeal, Cedar Rapids
