= 2015 Nebraska Danger season =

Sports season

- Owner: Charlie Bosselman
- General manager: Mike McCoy
- Head coach: Mike Davis
- Home stadium: Eihusen Arena; 700 East Stolley Park Rd. Grand Island, NE 68801

Results
- Record: 10-4
- Conference place: 1st
- Playoffs: Won Intense Conference Championship 86-43 (Fever); Lost United Bowl 27-62 (Storm)

The 2015 Nebraska Danger season is the fifth season for the Nebraska Danger as a professional indoor football franchise and their fifth in the Indoor Football League (IFL). One of ten teams competing in the IFL for the 2015 season, the Nebraska Danger are members of the Intense Conference. For the fifth consecutive year, the team played their home games under head coach Mike Davis in the Eihusen Arena at the Heartland Events Center in Grand Island, Nebraska.

== Regular season ==
All start times are local time

Week	Day	Date	Kickoff	Opponent	Results		Location
Week	Day	Date	Kickoff	Opponent	Score	Record	Location
1	Sunday	March 1	3:00pm	at Green Bay Blizzard	W 57-32	1-0	Resch Center
2	Saturday	March 7	7:00pm	Wichita Falls Nighthawks	W 45-30	2-0	Eihusen Arena
3	Saturday	March 14	7:00pm	at Wichita Falls Nighthawks	W 36-26	3-0	Kay Yeager Coliseum
4	BYE						
5	Friday	March 27	7:00pm	Iowa Barnstormers	W 76-50	4-0	Eihusen Arena
6	Friday	April 3	7:05pm	at Tri-Cities Fever	L 59-67	4-1	Toyota Center
7	Friday	April 10	7:00pm	Cedar Rapids Titans	W 52-42	5-1	Eihusen Arena
8	Saturday	April 18	7:05pm	at Iowa Barnstormers	W 33-16	6-1	Wells Fargo Arena
9	Friday	April 24	7:00pm	Bemidji Axemen	W 74-55	7-1	Eihusen Arena
10	Saturday	May 2	7:00pm	Billings Wolves	W 64-61 (OT)	8-1	Eihusen Arena
11	BYE						
12	Saturday	May 16	7:05pm	at Sioux Falls Storm	L 40-53	8-2	Denny Sanford PREMIER Center
13	Saturday	May 23	7:00pm	Colorado Ice	W 67-57	9-2	Eihusen Arena
14	Friday	May 29	7:30pm	at Colorado Ice	L 36-53	9-3	Budweiser Events Center
15	Saturday	June 6	7:00pm	Wichita Falls Nighthawks	W 50-34	10-3	Eihusen Arena
16	Friday	June 12	7:15pm	at Billings Wolves	L 50-60	10-4	Rimrock Auto Arena at MetraPark
17	BYE						

== Standings ==
2015 Intense Conference
	W	L	T	PCT	PF	PA	GB	STK
y-Nebraska Danger	10	4	0	.714	739	636	--	L1
x-Tri-Cities Fever	8	6	0	.571	648	655	2.0	W1
Colorado Ice	6	8	0	.429	658	666	4.0	W3
Billings Wolves	5	9	0	.357	638	663	5.0	W1
Wichita Falls Nighthawks	4	10	0	.286	546	615	6.0	L5

=== Postseason ===
Week	Day	Date	Kickoff	Opponent	Results		Location
Week	Day	Date	Kickoff	Opponent	Score	Record	Location
Intense Conference Championship	Friday	June 26	7:15pm	Tri-Cities Fever	W 86-43	1-0	Eihusen Arena
United Bowl	Saturday	July 11	5:05pm	at Sioux Falls Storm	L 27-62	1-1	Denny Sanford PREMIER Center

== Roster ==
2015 Nebraska Danger roster
Quarterbacks: 4 Brian Carnes; 10 Jameel Sewell; Running backs: 23 Waymon James; Wide receivers: 85 Marcus Barnett; 7 Troy Evans; 11 Thomas Mayo; 15 Gavin Otte; 21 Marquel Wade	Offensive linemen: 65 Terrance Clark; 72 Darius Savage; 71 Mike Trice; 76 Trevis Turner; Defensive linemen: 8 Adrian Davis; 29 Justin Edison; 94 Cory Grissom; 91 Jervonte Jackson; 52 Aronde Stanton	Linebackers: 13 Cornelius Brown; Defensive backs: 9 Jamar Love; 5 Isiah Scott; 17 Xavier Smith; 6 Kenronte Walker; 20 Braylon Webb; 1 Malcolm Williams; Kickers: 22 Cody Thornton	Injured Reserve: 6 Harcourt Farquharson DB; 21 Darnell Terrell DB; Exempt List: currently vacant; Roster updated June 17, 2015; 25 Active, 2 Inactive → More rosters
