= DeJay Lester =

American football player (born 1988)

No. 1, 8, 17, 18, 5
- Position: Wide receiver

Personal information
- Born: December 14, 1988 (age 37)
- Listed height: 6 ft 3 in (1.91 m)
- Listed weight: 208 lb (94 kg)

Career information
- High school: Layton (UT) Christian
- College: Wyoming
- NFL draft: 2012: undrafted

Career history
- Green Bay Blizzard (2013); Utah Blaze (2013); Bemidji Axemen (2014); Iowa Barnstormers (2014–2015); New Orleans VooDoo (2015); Tri-Cities Fever (2015–2016); Cedar Rapids Titans (2016); Iowa Barnstormers (2017)

Career AFL statistics
- Receptions: 63
- Receiving yards: 770
- Receiving TDs: 9
- Rushing yards: 18
- Rushing TDs: 1
- Stats at ArenaFan.com

DeJay Lester (born December 14, 1988) is an American former football wide receiver. He played college football at Wyoming.

== College career ==
Lester began his college career at Snow College, as a defensive back and played a great deal as a true freshman on a National Champion-Runner Up team. Following his freshman season, he moved to wide receiver with the foreknowledge that he would need to redshirt based on the depth that was already in place at that position. He was a full-time starter in 2009. Lester's play at Snow lead him to earn a scholarship offer from the University of Wyoming. He finished his career at Wyoming with five catches.

== Professional career ==
=== Utah Stealth ===
Played 3 games for the Utah Stealth Semi-Pro team of the Rocky Mountain Football League. Finished third on team with 12-184-2 in receiving, 8-182 on kick returning, and 4-88-1 for punt returns. Had a 73-yard punt return for a td.

=== Bemidji Axemen ===
Lester signed with the Bemidji Axemen of the IFL for 2014. He only played in a single game for the Axemen on February 22. On February 24, 2014, Lester was released by the Axemen.

=== Iowa Barnstormers ===
On February 25, 2014, Lester was assigned to the Iowa Barnstormers. He was released by the Barnstormers on April 16, 2015.

=== New Orleans VooDoo ===
On April 15, 2015, Lester was assigned to the New Orleans VooDoo. He was placed on reassignment on April 30, 2015.

=== Tri-Cities Fever ===
On May 7, 2015, Lester was signed by the Tri-Cities Fever. On May 2, 2016, Lester was released.

=== Cedar Rapids Titans ===
On May 18, 2016, Lester signed with the Cedar Rapids Titans. On June 28, 2016, Lester was released.

=== Return to Iowa ===
On March 16, 2017, Lester signed with the Barnstormers.
