= 2015 Sioux Falls Storm season =

Indoor Football League team season

- Owner: Todd Tryon
- Head coach: Kurtiss Riggs
- Home stadium: Denny Sanford Premier Center; 1201 North West Avenue; Sioux Falls, SD 57104

Results
- Record: 14-0
- Conference place: 1st
- Playoffs: Won United Conference Championship 34-12 (Titans); Won United Bowl 62-27 (Danger)

The 2015 Sioux Falls Storm season was the team's sixteenth season as a professional indoor football franchise and seventh in the Indoor Football League (IFL). One of ten teams that competed in the IFL for the 2015 season, the Sioux Falls Storm were members of the United Conference.

Led by head coach Kurtiss Riggs, the Storm played their home games at the Denny Sanford Premier Center in Sioux Falls, South Dakota.

== Schedule ==
Key: Win Tie Loss Bye

=== Pre-season ===
Week	Day	Date	Kickoff	Opponent	Results		Location	Attendance
Week	Day	Date	Kickoff	Opponent	Score	Record	Location	Attendance
1	Friday	February 14	7:00pm	Sioux City Bandits (CIF)	W 64-58	1–0	Denny Sanford PREMIER Center	5,000

=== Regular season ===
All start times are local time

Week	Day	Date	Kickoff	Opponent	Results		Location
Week	Day	Date	Kickoff	Opponent	Score	Record	Location
1	Saturday	February 28	7:05pm	at Bemidji Axemen	W 66-42	1-0	Sanford Center
2	Saturday	March 7	8:05pm	at Cedar Rapids Titans	W 50-45	2-0	U.S. Cellular Center
3	Sunday	March 15	3:00pm	at Colorado Ice	W 59-40	3-0	Budweiser Events Center
4	BYE						
5	Saturday	March 28	7:05pm	Billings Wolves	W 56-41	4-0	Denny Sanford Premier Center
6	BYE						
7	Saturday	April 11	7:05pm	Colorado Ice	W 70-41	5-0	Denny Sanford Premier Center
8	Friday	April 17	7:05pm	at Tri-Cities Fever	W 62-42	6-0	Toyota Center
9	Saturday	April 25	7:05pm	Iowa Barnstormers	W 87-11	7-0	Denny Sanford Premier Center
10	Saturday	May 2	7:05pm	at Iowa Barnstormers	W 55-24	8-0	Wells Fargo Arena
11	Friday	May 8	7:05pm	Green Bay Blizzard	W 56-35	9-0	Denny Sanford Premier Center
12	Saturday	May 16	7:05pm	Nebraska Danger	W 53-40	10-0	Denny Sanford Premier Center
13	BYE						
14	Sunday	May 31	3:00pm	at Bemidji Axemen	W 90-20	11-0	Sanford Center
15	Saturday	June 6	7:05pm	Tri-Cities Fever	W 59-38	12-0	Denny Sanford Premier Center
16	Saturday	June 13	7:05pm	at Green Bay Blizzard	W 75-31	13-0	Resch Center
17	Saturday	June 20	7:05pm	Cedar Rapids Titans	W 46-31	14-0	Denny Sanford Premier Center

==== Standings ====
2015 United Conference
	W	L	T	PCT	PF	PA	GB	STK
y-Sioux Falls Storm	14	0	0	1.000	884	481	--	W14
x-Cedar Rapids Titans	9	5	0	.643	642	487	5.0	L1
Green Bay Blizzard	6	8	0	.429	620	715	8.0	L3
Iowa Barnstormers	6	8	0	.429	528	631	8.0	W1
Bemidji Axemen	2	12	0	.143	449	803	12.0	L10

=== Postseason ===
Week	Day	Date	Kickoff	Opponent	Results		Location
Week	Day	Date	Kickoff	Opponent	Score	Record	Location
United Conference Championship	Saturday	June 27	5:05pm	Cedar Rapids Titans	W 34-12	1-0	Denny Sanford Premier Center
United Bowl	Saturday	July 11	5:05pm	Nebraska Danger	W 62-27	2-0	Denny Sanford Premier Center

== Roster ==
2015 Sioux Falls Storm roster
Quarterbacks: 8 Lorenzo Brown; 1 Martevious Young; Running backs: 16 Rolandan Finch; Wide receivers: 20 Judd Harrold; 4 Brandon Johnson-Farrell; 23 Mike Tatum; 9 James Terry	Offensive linemen: 74 Rashaud Mungro; 71 Brandon Puffer; 55 Charlie Sanders; 75 Myniya Smith; 95 Anthony Thomas; Defensive linemen: 58 Sam Campbell; 15 Claude Davis; 96 Cory Johnsen; 56 Brandon Lindsey; 44 Eze Obiora; 52 Calvin Ursin	Linebackers: 3 Tyler Knight; Defensive backs: 2 Adonis Armstrong; 6 Elijah Fields; 13 Rahn Franklin Jr.; 12 Matt Hermanson; 18 DeQuan Starling; 24 Devion Tate; Kickers: 11 Parker Douglass	Injury Reserve: currently vacant; Exempt List: 22 Tory Harrison RB; Refused to Report: 2 Chris Baker DL; 71 Kyle Bryant OL; -- Damien Lee DL; rookies in italics Roster updated June 22, 2015; 26 Active, 4 Inactive → More rosters
