= Kenronte Walker =

American football player (born 1990)

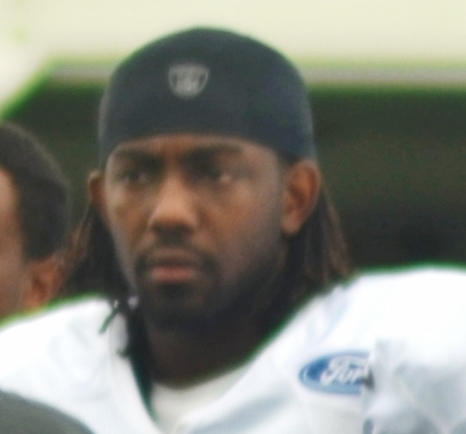
- Walker in 2013 Cleveland Browns training camp

No. 6
- Position: Safety

Personal information
- Born: July 28, 1990 (age 36); Fayetteville, North Carolina, U.S.
- Listed height: 6 ft 0 in (1.83 m)
- Listed weight: 210 lb (95 kg)

Career information
- College: Missouri
- NFL draft: 2013: undrafted

Career history
- Cleveland Browns (2013)*; Nebraska Danger (2015)
- * Offseason or practice squad member only

Kenronte Walker (born July 28, 1990) is an American former professional football safety. He was signed as an undrafted free agent by the Cleveland Browns in 2013. He played college football at Missouri.

== Professional career ==
=== Cleveland Browns ===
On May 2, 2013, he signed with the Cleveland Browns as an undrafted free agent. On August 18, 2013, he was waived by the Browns. He appeared on the season 7 premiere of Wipeout, "Fall in the Family", with his cousin, Courtney.

=== Nebraska Danger ===
On May 19, 2015, Walker was signed by the Nebraska Danger of the Indoor Football League.
