= Jackie Chambers =

American gridiron football player (born 1984)

No. 13
- Position: Wide receiver

Personal information
- Born: September 8, 1984 (age 42); Miami, Florida, U.S.
- Listed height: 5 ft 11 in (1.80 m)
- Listed weight: 180 lb (82 kg)

Career information
- High school: Miami (FL) Edison
- College: Lane
- NFL draft: 2009: undrafted

Career history
- Calgary Stampeders (2009); Kansas City Command (2012); Philadelphia Soul (2013)*; Spokane Shock (2013); Tri-Cities Fever (2013–2014); Cleveland Gladiators (2015)*; New Orleans VooDoo (2015)
- * Offseason or practice squad member only

Awards and highlights
- First-team All-SIAC KR (2008); Second-team All-SIAC WR (2008); AFL All-Ironman Team (2012)

Career CFL statistics
- Receptions: 1
- Receiving yards: 10
- Receiving TDs: 0
- Stats at CFL.ca (archived)

Career AFL statistics
- Receptions: 71
- Receiving yards: 912
- Receiving TDs: 9
- Return yards: 1,322
- Return TDs: 2
- Stats at ArenaFan.com

Jackie Chambers (born September 8, 1984) is an American former professional football wide receiver. He was signed by the Stampeders as a street free agent in 2009. He played college football for the Lane Dragons.

== Early life ==
Chambers attended Miami Edison High School in Miami, Florida, where he was named a Class 5A All State First-Team selection as a senior in 2004.

== College career ==
Chambers began his college career at the University of South Florida. As a senior, Chambers played at Lane College, where he was named First-Team All-Southern Intercollegiate Athletic Conference (SIAC) as a kick returner, and Second-Team All-SIAC as a wide receiver.

== Professional career ==
On April 30, 2015, Chambers was assigned to the New Orleans VooDoo. He was placed on reassignment on July 28, 2015.
