= 2013 Nebraska Danger season =

Indoor Football League team season

- Owner: Charlie Bosselman
- Head coach: Mike Davis
- Home stadium: Eihusen Arena

Results
- Record: 11–5
- Conference place: 1st Intense
- Playoffs: Lost 2013 United Bowl

The 2013 Nebraska Danger season was the third season for the Nebraska Danger as a football franchise and their third in the Indoor Football League. One of just nine teams competing in the IFL for the 2013 season, the Nebraska Danger are members of the Intense Conference. The team played their home games under head coach Mike Davis at the Eihusen Arena in Grand Island, Nebraska.

== Season summary ==
The Danger were successful in the regular season, clinching the Intense Conference and qualifying for the IFL playoffs. The team defeated the Colorado Ice to win the Intense Conference and reach the United Bowl but fell in the championship game to the Sioux Falls Storm 40-43.

The Danger were named the IFL Franchise of the Year for 2013. Quarterback Jameel Sewell was named both the IFL's Most Valuable Player and its Offensive Player of the Year.

== Off-field moves ==
Shortly before the 2013 season began, the owner of the Cheyenne Warriors died which forced that team to suspend operations and the IFL to revise its schedule to accommodate the now 9-team league.

== Schedule ==
Key: Win Tie Loss Bye

=== Preseason ===
Week	Day	Date	Kickoff	Opponent	Results		Location
Week	Day	Date	Kickoff	Opponent	Final score	Record	Location
1	Saturday	February 23	7:05pm	Lincoln Haymakers	W 56–21	1–0	Eihusen Arena

=== Regular season ===
All start times are local

Week	Day	Date	Kickoff	Opponent	Results		Location
Week	Day	Date	Kickoff	Opponent	Final score	Record	Location
1	BYE						
2	BYE						
3	Saturday	March 2	7:00pm	Sioux Falls Storm	W 30–21	1–0	Eihusen Arena
4	Saturday	March 9	7:00pm	Colorado Ice	W 73–50	2–0	Eihusen Arena
5	Friday	March 15	7:05pm	at Tri-Cities Fever	L 31–44	2–1	Toyota Center
6	Friday	March 22	7:00pm	Wyoming Cavalry	W 62–35	3–1	Eihusen Arena
7	BYE						
8	Saturday	April 6	7:00pm	Texas Revolution	W 53–50	4–1	Eihusen Arena
9	Saturday	April 13	6:00pm	at Colorado Ice	L 12–32	4–2	Budweiser Events Center
10	Saturday	April 20	7:05pm	at Texas Revolution	W 62-47	5–2	Allen Event Center
11	Friday	April 26	7:00pm	Colorado Ice	W 69-66	6–2	Eihusen Arena
12	Saturday	May 4	7:05pm	at Sioux Falls Storm	L 41-43	6–3	Sioux Falls Arena
13	Friday	May 10	7:30pm	at Green Bay Blizzard	L 47-53	6–4	Resch Center
14	Friday	May 17	7:05pm	at Wyoming Cavalry	W 82-53	7–4	Casper Events Center
15	Friday	May 24	7:00pm	Wyoming Cavalry	W 69–42	8–4	Eihusen Arena
16	BYE						
17	Friday	June 7	7:00pm	at Colorado Ice	W 67–55	9–4	Budweiser Events Center
18	Saturday	June 15	7:00pm	Tri-Cities Fever	W 69–64	10–4	Eihusen Arena

=== Postseason ===
Round	Day	Date	Kickoff	Opponent	Results		Location
Round	Day	Date	Kickoff	Opponent	Final score	Record	Location
Intense Conference Championship	Saturday	June 22	7:00pm	Colorado Ice	W 55–50	1–0	Eihusen Arena
2013 United Bowl	Saturday	June 29	7:00pm	at Sioux Falls Storm	L 40–43	1–1	Sioux Falls Arena

== Roster ==
2013 Nebraska Danger roster
Quarterbacks: 10 Jameel Sewell; Running backs: 5 Randy Bell; 20 Daniel Libre; Wide receivers: 85 Marcus Barnett; 4 Kayne Farquharson; 15 Andrew Piper-Jordan; 1 Corey Surrency	Offensive linemen: 55 Conan Amituanai; 52 Jorge Guerra; 75 D'Angelo McCray; 72 Darius Savage; Defensive linemen: 56 Tommy Chavis; 8 Adrian Davis; 99 Jervonte Jackson; 93 Lolomana Mikaele	Linebackers: 33 Maurice Simpkins; Defensive backs: 2 Ramon Broadway; 13 Pig Brown; 26 Kayne Elenburg; 22 Carl Gettis; 21 Darnell Terrell; Kickers: 17 Brendan Hanaphy; 25 Joe Houston	Injured Reserve: currently vacant; Exempt List: currently vacant; Practice squad: currently vacant; Roster updated March 26, 2013; 25 Active, 0 Inactive, 0 PS → More rosters

== Standings ==
2013 Intense Conference
	W	L	T	PCT	PF	PA	DIV	GB	STK
y - Nebraska Danger	10	4	0	0.714	767	655	5-2	0.0	W4
x - Colorado Ice	9	5	0	0.643	651	579	5-3	1.0	L1
Tri-Cities Fever	6	8	0	0.429	626	591	4-4	4.0	W1
Wyoming Cavalry	1	13	0	0.071	433	754	1-7	9.0	L9
