= 2015 Tri-Cities Fever season =

Indoor Football League team season

- Owner: Teri Carr
- General manager: Teri Carr
- Head coach: Adam Shackleford
- Home stadium: Toyota Center; 7016 West Grandridge Blvd. Kennewick, WA 99336

Results
- Record: 8–6
- Conference place: 2nd
- Playoffs: Lost Intense Conference Championship 43–86 (Danger)

The 2015 Tri-Cities Fever season was the team's eleventh season as a professional indoor football franchise and sixth in the Indoor Football League (IFL). One of ten teams competing in the IFL for the 2015 season, the Kennewick, Washington-based Tri-Cities Fever were members of the Intense Conference.

Under the leadership of owner/general manager Teri Carr and head coach Adam Shackleford, the team played their home games at the Toyota Center in Kennewick, Washington.

== Schedule ==
Key: Win Tie Loss Bye

=== Regular season ===
All start times are local time

Week	Day	Date	Kickoff	Opponent	Results		Location
Week	Day	Date	Kickoff	Opponent	Score	Record	Location
1	Saturday	February 28	7:05pm	Billings Wolves	W 30–13	1–0	Toyota Center
2	BYE						
3	Saturday	March 14	7:05pm	Green Bay Blizzard	L 63–71	1–1	Toyota Center
4	Friday	March 20	8:05pm	at Cedar Rapids Titans	L 8–56	1–2	U.S. Cellular Center
5	Saturday	March 28	7:00pm	at Wichita Falls Nighthawks	W 58–48	2–2	Kay Yeager Coliseum
6	Friday	April 3	7:05pm	Nebraska Danger	W 67–59	3–2	Toyota Center
7	Friday	April 11	7:05pm	at Bemidji Axemen	W 54–35	4–2	Sanford Center
8	Friday	April 17	7:05pm	Sioux Falls Storm	L 42–62	4–3	Toyota Center
9	Sunday	April 26	3:00pm	at Billings Wolves	W 58–30	5–3	Rimrock Auto Arena at MetraPark
10	Saturday	May 2	7:05pm	Colorado Ice	W 41–34	6–3	Toyota Center
11	BYE						
12	Saturday	May 16	7:00pm	at Colorado Ice	W 52–36	7–3	Budweiser Events Center
13	Saturday	May 23	7:05pm	Billings Wolves	L 45–48	7–4	Toyota Center
14	Friday	May 29	7:15pm	at Billings Wolves	L 50–61	7–5	Rimrock Auto Arena at MetraPark
15	Saturday	June 6	7:05pm	at Sioux Falls Storm	L 38–59	7–6	Denny Sanford PREMIER Center
16	Saturday	June 13	7:05pm	Iowa Barnstormers	W 42–39	8–6	Toyota Center
17	BYE						

== Standings ==
2015 Intense Conference
	W	L	T	PCT	PF	PA	GB	STK
y-Nebraska Danger	10	4	0	.714	739	636	--	L1
x-Tri-Cities Fever	8	6	0	.571	648	655	2.0	W1
Colorado Ice	6	8	0	.429	658	666	4.0	W3
Billings Wolves	5	9	0	.357	638	663	5.0	W1
Wichita Falls Nighthawks	4	10	0	.286	546	615	6.0	L5

=== Postseason ===
Week	Day	Date	Kickoff	Opponent	Results		Location
Week	Day	Date	Kickoff	Opponent	Score	Record	Location
Intense Conference Championship	Friday	June 26	7:15pm	at Nebraska Danger	L 43–86	0–1	Eihusen Arena

== Roster ==
2015 Tri-Cities Fever roster
Quarterbacks: 14 Dominique Blackman; -- Dante Perez; Running backs: 11 Andrew Pierce; Wide receivers: 8 Austin Dotson; 17 DeJay Lester; 24 Dejuan Miller; 4 Steven Whitehead; 10 J. D. Woods	Offensive linemen: 79 Rodrick Gladney; 56 Gabriel Hampton; 52 Lloyd Morrison; Defensive linemen: 93 Darian Barnes; 9 Jake Killeen; 40 Brandon Rankin; 34 Kyler Reed; 91 Darius Shipley; 13 Pat Wertz	Linebackers: 27 Leon Jackson; 7 Joe Thornton; Defensive backs: 21 Rudell Crim; 17 Donterrel Evans; 23 Aaron Foster; 22 Lorenzo White Jr.; Kickers: 2 Brady Beeson	Injured Reserve: 3 Dustin Bell DB; 1 Dennis Kennedy RB; 5 Houston Lillard QB; 99 Demonte McAllister DL; 10 Patrick McCain QB; Refused to report: 13 Aaron Bellazin DL; 90 Sean McDonald DL; 20 Troy Sanders DB; Exempt List: currently vacant; rookies in italics Roster updated June 23, 2015; 24 Active, 8 Inactive → More rosters
