= 2013 Colorado Ice season =

Indoor Football League team season

- Owner: Tom Wigley
- General manager: Collins Sanders
- Head coach: Heron O'Neal
- Home stadium: Budweiser Events Center

Results
- Record: 8–4
- Division place: Intense Conference

The 2013 Colorado Ice season was the team's seventh season as a football franchise and fifth in the Indoor Football League (IFL). Founded in 2007 as part of United Indoor Football, the Colorado Ice became charter members of the IFL when the UIF merged with the Intense Football League before the 2009 season. One of just nine teams that competed in the IFL for the 2013 season, the Fort Collins-based Colorado Ice were members of the Intense Conference. In their second season under head coach Heron O'Neal, the team played their home games at the Budweiser Events Center in Loveland, Colorado.

== Off-field moves ==
Shortly before the 2013 season began, the owner of the Cheyenne Warriors died which forced that team to suspend operations and the IFL to revise its schedule to accommodate the now 9-team league.

In late May 2013, the team extended the contract of head coach Heron O'Neal through the 2017 season.

== Schedule ==
Key: Win Tie Loss Bye

=== Preseason ===
| Week | Day | Date | Kickoff | Opponent | Results | | Location |
| Week | Day | Date | Kickoff | Opponent | Final Score | Record | Location |
|---|---|---|---|---|---|---|---|
| 1 | Thursday | February 21 | 7:00pm | Metro State Roadrunners | W 105–0 | 1–0 | Budweiser Events Center |

=== Regular season ===
| Week | Day | Date | Kickoff | Opponent | Results | | Location |
| Week | Day | Date | Kickoff | Opponent | Final Score | Record | Location |
|---|---|---|---|---|---|---|---|
| 1 | BYE | | | | | | |
| 2 | BYE | | | | | | |
| 3 | Friday | March 1 | 7:00pm | Tri-Cities Fever | W 42–38 | 1–0 | Budweiser Events Center |
| 4 | Saturday | March 9 | 7:00pm | at Nebraska Danger | L 50–73 | 1–1 | Eihusen Arena |
| 5 | Sunday | March 17 | 3:00pm | Green Bay Blizzard | W 24–20 | 2–1 | Budweiser Events Center |
| 6 | Sunday | March 24 | 3:00pm | Sioux Falls Storm | W 37–33 | 3–1 | Budweiser Events Center |
| 7 | Friday | March 29 | 7:05pm | at Wyoming Cavalry | W 54–36 | 4–1 | Casper Events Center |
| 8 | BYE | | | | | | |
| 9 | Saturday | April 13 | 6:00pm | Nebraska Danger | W 32–12 | 5–1 | Budweiser Events Center |
| 10 | Saturday | April 20 | 7:05pm | at Sioux Falls Storm | L 43–45 | 5–2 | Sioux Falls Arena |
| 11 | Friday | April 26 | 7:00pm | at Nebraska Danger | L 66–69 | 5–3 | Eihusen Arena |
| 12 | Friday | May 3 | 7:05pm | at Wyoming Cavalry | W 51–41 | 6–3 | Casper Events Center |
| 13 | BYE | | | | | | |
| 14 | Saturday | May 18 | 6:00pm | Tri-Cities Fever | W 39–35 | 7–3 | Budweiser Events Center |
| 15 | Saturday | May 25 | 7:05pm | at Tri-Cities Fever | L 37–41 | 7–4 | Toyota Center |
| 16 | Saturday | June 1 | 7:05pm | at Texas Revolution | W 63–26 | 8–4 | Allen Event Center |
| 17 | Friday | June 7 | 7:00pm | Nebraska Danger | L 55–67 | 8–5 | Budweiser Events Center |
| 18 | Saturday | June 15 | 6:00pm | Wyoming Cavalry | W 58–43 | 9–5 | Budweiser Events Center |

== Roster ==
2013 Colorado Ice roster
| Quarterbacks: 13 Willie Copeland; Running backs: 28 Cordera Eason; Wide receivers: 1 Jason Barnes; 88 Justin Helwege; 3 Kyle Kaiser; 85 Patrick Walker | Offensive linemen: 54 Abdul Kuyateh; 72 Dameon Terry; 78 Mike Trice; Defensive linemen: 51 Marquis George; 33 Gabe Knapton; 48 Christopher Mayes; 40 Conrad Obi; 55 Anthony Perkins | Linebackers: 11 Greg Jackson; 5 Rico McCoy; 7 Mycal Sisson; Defensive backs: 19 Michael Eby; 6 Moses Ellis Jr.; 24 Jovan Jackson; 22 Lamar Market; 20 Corey Sample; 21 A. J. Wallace; Kickers: 9 Aric Goodman | Injured Reserve: currently vacant; Exempt List: currently vacant; Practice squad: currently vacant; rookies in italics Roster updated March 26, 2013; 37 Active, 0 Inactive, 0 PS → More rosters |

== Standings ==
2013 Intense Conference
| | W | L | T | PCT | PF | PA | DIV | GB | STK |
|---|---|---|---|---|---|---|---|---|---|
| y - Nebraska Danger | 10 | 4 | 0 | 0.714 | 767 | 655 | 5-2 | 0.0 | W4 |
| x - Colorado Ice | 9 | 5 | 0 | 0.643 | 651 | 579 | 5-3 | 1.0 | L1 |
| Tri-Cities Fever | 6 | 8 | 0 | 0.429 | 626 | 591 | 4-4 | 4.0 | W1 |
| Wyoming Cavalry | 1 | 13 | 0 | 0.071 | 433 | 754 | 1-7 | 9.0 | L9 |
