= 2015 Bemidji Axemen season =

Indoor Football League team season

- Owner: Ross Ladehoff
- General manager: Adam Barnhardt
- Head coach: Lee Patton (Interim); Dixie Wooten (fired on May 13, 2-8 record)
- Home stadium: Sanford Center; 1111 Event Center Drive; Bemidji, Minnesota 56601

Results
- Record: 2-12
- Conference place: 5th
- Playoffs: did not qualify

The 2015 Bemidji Axemen season was the team's second and final season as a professional indoor football franchise and second in the Indoor Football League (IFL). One of ten teams competing in the IFL for the 2015 season, the Bemidji, Minnesota-based Axemen are members of the United Conference.

== Schedule ==
Key: Win Tie Loss Bye

=== Pre-season ===
| Week | Day | Date | Kickoff | Opponent | Results | | Location |
| Week | Day | Date | Kickoff | Opponent | Score | Record | Location |
|---|---|---|---|---|---|---|---|
| 1 | Sunday | February 8 | 7:05pm | Minnesota Sting | W 74-7 | 1–0 | Sanford Center |

=== Regular season ===
All start times are local time

| Week | Day | Date | Kickoff | Opponent | Results | | Location | Attendance |
| Week | Day | Date | Kickoff | Opponent | Score | Record | Location | Attendance |
|---|---|---|---|---|---|---|---|---|
| 1 | Saturday | February 28 | 7:05pm | Sioux Falls Storm | L 42-66 | 0-1 | Sanford Center | 2,950 |
| 2 | BYE | | | | | | | |
| 3 | Friday | March 13 | 7:05pm | Iowa Barnstormers | L 26-38 | 0-2 | Sanford Center | 2,719 |
| 4 | Saturday | March 21 | 7:05pm | Billings Wolves | W 47-44 (OT) | 1-2 | Sanford Center | 2,730 |
| 5 | Sunday | March 29 | 3:00pm | at Green Bay Blizzard | W 55-54 | 2-2 | Resch Center | 3,600 |
| 6 | Saturday | April 4 | 3:00pm | at Wichita Falls Nighthawks | L 27-58 | 2-3 | Kay Yeager Coliseum | 1,820 |
| 7 | Friday | April 10 | 7:05pm | Tri-Cities Fever | L 35-54 | 2-4 | Sanford Center | 3,320 |
| 8 | Saturday | April 18 | 7:05pm | Cedar Rapids Titans | L 36-39 | 2-5 | Sanford Center | 3,195 |
| 9 | Friday | April 24 | 7:00pm | at Nebraska Danger | L 55-74 | 2-6 | Eihusen Arena | 4,514 |
| 10 | Saturday | May 2 | 7:05pm | Green Bay Blizzard | L 28-55 | 2-7 | Sanford Center | 2,135 |
| 11 | Saturday | May 9 | 7:00pm | at Colorado Ice | L 27-37 | 2-8 | Budweiser Events Center | 2,218 |
| 12 | Saturday | May 16 | 7:15pm | at Billings Wolves | L 25-70 | 2-9 | Rimrock Auto Arena at MetraPark | 3,103 |
| 13 | BYE | | | | | | | |
| 14 | Sunday | May 31 | 7:05pm | Sioux Falls Storm | L 20-90 | 2-10 | Sanford Center | 1,860 |
| 15 | Saturday | June 6 | 7:05pm | at Iowa Barnstormers | L 26-76 | 2-11 | Wells Fargo Arena | 7,165 |
| 16 | Saturday | June 13 | 7:05pm | at Cedar Rapids Titans | L 0-48 | 2-12 | U.S. Cellular Center | 3,940 |
| 17 | BYE | | | | | | | |

== Roster ==
2015 Bemidji Axemen roster
| Quarterbacks: 1 Ryan Balentine; 8 Efi Eyo; Running backs: 5 Mulku Kalokoh; 24 Avery Walker; Wide receivers: 9 Derrick Foster; 3 Josh Jarboe; 24 Joshua Lailson; 11 Rashad Rich; 15 Darnell Williams | Offensive linemen: 56 William Slade; 70 Kasimili Uitalia; 55 Neemia Vitale; Defensive linemen: 12 Dalton Etimani; 16 Ayoub Hamidah; 32 Rony Nelson; 18 Paramore Tapa; 99 Ino Vitale | Linebackers: 7 Clarence Bumpas; Defensive backs: 4 Tony Grimes; 20 Ben Kargbo; 8 Adam Lucas; 17 Larry Miller Jr.; 6 Damien Payne; 2 Antonie Tharpe; Special teams: -- Kyle Fodness | Reserve lists: -- Xavier Boyce WR (Exempt); 28 Jory Johnson LB (IR); 50 Henry Orelus OL (IR); -- Tino Tuilata OL (DNR); Rookies in italics Roster updated June 10, 2015; 25 Active, 4 Inactive → More rosters |

== Standings ==
2015 United Conference
| | W | L | T | PCT | PF | PA | GB | STK |
|---|---|---|---|---|---|---|---|---|
| y-Sioux Falls Storm | 14 | 0 | 0 | 1.000 | 884 | 481 | -- | W14 |
| x-Cedar Rapids Titans | 9 | 5 | 0 | .643 | 642 | 487 | 5.0 | L1 |
| Green Bay Blizzard | 6 | 8 | 0 | .429 | 620 | 715 | 8.0 | L3 |
| Iowa Barnstormers | 6 | 8 | 0 | .429 | 528 | 631 | 8.0 | W1 |
| Bemidji Axemen | 2 | 12 | 0 | .143 | 449 | 803 | 12.0 | L10 |
