= 2015 Iowa Barnstormers season =

Indoor Football League team season

- Owner: Jeff Lamberti
- General manager: John Pettit
- Head coach: Joe Brannen
- Home stadium: Wells Fargo Arena

Results
- Record: 6-8
- Conference place: 4th
- Playoffs: did not qualify

The 2015 Iowa Barnstormers season was the team's fifteenth season as a professional indoor football franchise and first in the Indoor Football League (IFL). One of ten teams competing in the IFL for the 2015 season, the Iowa Barnstormers are members of the United Conference. The team plays their home games at the Wells Fargo Arena in the Des Moines, Iowa.

== Schedule ==
Key: Win Tie Loss Bye

=== Regular season ===
All start times are local time

Week	Day	Date	Kickoff	Opponent	Results		Location	Attendance
Week	Day	Date	Kickoff	Opponent	Score	Record	Location	Attendance
1	Saturday	February 28	8:05 PM	at Cedar Rapids Titans	L 20–51	0–1	U.S. Cellular Center	5,275
2	BYE							
3	Friday	March 13	7:05 PM	at Bemidji Axemen	W 38–26	1–1	Sanford Center	2,719
4	Sunday	March 22	3:00 PM	at Green Bay Blizzard	L 46–47	1–2	Resch Center	2,833
5	Friday	March 27	7:00 PM	at Nebraska Danger	L 50–76	1–3	Eihusen Arena	4,975
6	BYE							
7	Saturday	April 11	7:05 PM	Green Bay Blizzard	W 75–64	2–3	Wells Fargo Arena	6,176
8	Saturday	April 18	7:05 PM	Nebraska Danger	L 16–33	2–4	Wells Fargo Arena	5,745
9	Saturday	April 25	7:05 PM	at Sioux Falls Storm	L 11–87	2–5	Denny Sanford PREMIER Center	6,983
10	Saturday	May 2	7:05 PM	Sioux Falls Storm	L 24–55	2–6	Wells Fargo Arena	5,985
11	Friday	May 8	7:15 PM	at Billings Wolves	W 20–17	3–6	Rimrock Auto Arena at MetraPark	3,158
12	Saturday	May 16	7:05 PM	Cedar Rapids Titans	L 46–50	3–7	Wells Fargo Arena	5,890
13	BYE							
14	Saturday	May 30	7:05 PM	Wichita Falls Nighthawks	W 29–25	4–7	Wells Fargo Arena	6,925
15	Saturday	June 6	7:05 PM	Bemidji Axemen	W 76–26	5–7	Wells Fargo Arena	7,165
16	Saturday	June 13	7:05 PM	at Tri-Cities Fever	L 39–42	5–8	Toyota Center	2,750
17	Saturday	June 20	7:05 PM	Green Bay Blizzard	W 38–32	6–8	Wells Fargo Arena	7,059

== Standings ==
2015 United Conference
	W	L	T	PCT	PF	PA	GB	STK
y-Sioux Falls Storm	14	0	0	1.000	884	481	--	W14
x-Cedar Rapids Titans	9	5	0	.643	642	487	5.0	L1
Green Bay Blizzard	6	8	0	.429	620	715	8.0	L3
Iowa Barnstormers	6	8	0	.429	528	631	8.0	W1
Bemidji Axemen	2	12	0	.143	449	803	12.0	L10

== Roster ==
2015 Iowa Barnstormers roster
Quarterbacks: 10 Taylor Genuser; Running backs: 9 Robbie Rouse; Wide receivers: 3 Lemans Casimier; 12 Lucas Hefty; -- Jerred Herring; 11 Brady Roland; 1 Johnny Thomas	Offensive linemen: 77 Tyler Ahrens; 52 Will Harris; -- Solomon Orr; 70 Evyn Perry; 75 Tyler Wells; Defensive linemen: 5 Austin Benson; 55 Sean Daniels; 99 Brett Park; 9 Ryan Smith; 56 Jeremy Stephens	Linebackers: 23 Javicz Jones; Defensive backs: 8 Alex Bartlett; 14 Kirkland Davidson; 22 Kevin Gilkey; 7 Matt Goldsmith; -- Isaiah Gresham; 21 T. J. Simmons; Kickers: 15 Joshua Gable	Injured reserve: 57 Alex Gonzalez OL; 12 Robbie Nallenweg QB; 2 Ranier Rackley RB; Refused to report: 4 Daron Clark WR; 8 Kameron Smith QB; 62 Ken Van Heule OL; Other League Exempt: Currently vacant; Rookies in italics; Roster updated June 18, 2015; 25 Active, 6 Inactive; → More rosters
