= 2015 Cedar Rapids Titans season =

Indoor Football League team season

- Owner: Chris Kokalis; Bob Sullivan; David Bradley; Kenneth Moninski
- General manager: Chris Kokalis
- Head coach: Mark Stoute
- Home stadium: U.S. Cellular Center; 370 1st Avenue NE; Cedar Rapids, Iowa 52401

Results
- Record: 9–5
- Conference place: 2nd
- Playoffs: Lost United Conference Championship 12–34 (Storm)

The 2015 Cedar Rapids Titans season was the fourth season of the Cedar Rapids Titans as a professional indoor football franchise in the Indoor Football League (IFL). One of ten teams competing in the IFL for the 2014 season, the Cedar Rapids Titans are members of the league's United Conference

The Titans play their home games at the U.S. Cellular Center in downtown Cedar Rapids, Iowa. The team is led by head coach Mark Stoute, the 2013 Indoor Football League Coach of the Year. The Titans Dolls dance squad is led by dance team director Lindsay Wray.

The Titans were tasked with replacing 2014 starting quarterback Spencer Ohm, while also losing the IFL's leading rusher, LaRon Council. The team signed Sam Durley, from the defunct Wyoming Cavalry to be their new starting quarterback. Durley got the Titans off to a 6–3 start, good enough for second place in the United Conference, but he was released on May 4, 2015 to sign with the New Orleans VooDoo. However, just two weeks prior to Durley's release, the Titans had traded for the 2014 IFL MVP, Willie Copeland.

== Schedule ==
Key: Win Tie Loss Bye

=== Regular season ===
All start times are local time

Week	Day	Date	Kickoff	Opponent	Results		Location
Week	Day	Date	Kickoff	Opponent	Score	Record	Location
1	Saturday	February 28	7:05pm	Iowa Barnstormers	W 51–20	1–0	U.S. Cellular Center
2	Saturday	April 7	7:05pm	Sioux Falls Storm	L 45–50	1–1	U.S. Cellular Center
3	Sunday	March 15	3:00pm	at Billings Wolves	W 45–38 (2 OT)	2–1	Rimrock Auto Arena at MetraPark
4	Friday	March 20	7:05pm	Tri-Cities Fever	W 56–8	3–1	U.S. Cellular Center
5	Saturday	March 28	7:05pm	Colorado Ice	W 39–29	4–1	U.S. Cellular Center
6	BYE						
7	Friday	April 10	7:00pm	at Nebraska Danger	L 42–52	4–2	Eihusen Arena
8	Saturday	April 18	7:05pm	at Bemidji Axemen	W 39–36	5–2	Sanford Center
9	Saturday	April 25	7:00pm	Green Bay Blizzard	L 49–52	5–3	Eihusen Arena
10	Saturday	May 2	7:00pm	at Wichita Falls Nighthawks	W 63–40	6–3	Kay Yeager Coliseum
11	Saturday	May 9	7:05pm	Wichita Falls Nighthawks	L 34–38	6–4	U.S. Cellular Center
12	Saturday	May 16	7:05pm	at Iowa Barnstormers	W 50–46	7–4	Wells Fargo Arena
13	BYE						
14	Saturday	May 30	6:00pm	at Green Bay Blizzard	W 50–32	8–4	Resch Center
15	BYE						
16	Saturday	June 13	7:05pm	Bemidji Axemen	W 48–0	9–4	U.S. Cellular Center
17	Saturday	June 20	7:05pm	at Sioux Falls Storm	L 31–46	9–5	Denny Sanford PREMIER Center

== Standings ==
2015 United Conference
	W	L	T	PCT	PF	PA	GB	STK
y-Sioux Falls Storm	14	0	0	1.000	884	481	--	W14
x-Cedar Rapids Titans	9	5	0	.643	642	487	5.0	L1
Green Bay Blizzard	6	8	0	.429	620	715	8.0	L3
Iowa Barnstormers	6	8	0	.429	528	631	8.0	W1
Bemidji Axemen	2	12	0	.143	449	803	12.0	L10

=== Postseason ===
Week	Day	Date	Kickoff	Opponent	Results		Location
Week	Day	Date	Kickoff	Opponent	Score	Record	Location
United Conference Championship	Saturday	June 27	5:05pm	at Sioux Falls Storm	L 12–34	0–1	Denny Sanford PREMIER Center

== Roster ==
2015 Cedar Rapids Titans roster
Quarterbacks: 1 Willie Copeland; Running backs: 28 Zach Brown; 37 Washaun Ealey; 20 Trent McGuire; Wide receivers: 15 Justin Helwege; 9 Bryan Pray; 4 Jasonus Tillery; 14 Charles Watkins	Offensive linemen: 98 A. J. Harmon; -- Lyron McClenney; 56 Taylor Pass; -- Mack Randall Jr.; 96 Maurice Robinson; -- Sosaia Vaitai; -- Kameron Young; Defensive linemen: 93 Xzavie Jackson; 90 Richard Posey; 56 Jeremiah Price	Linebackers: 44 Nick Haag; 19 Nikolas Sierra; Defensive backs: 16 Robert Brown; -- Fred Griggs; 5 B. J. Lowery; 7 Demetruce McNeal; 8 Tyree Robinson; 2 Arius Wright; Kickers: 3 Philip Welch	Injured Reserve: 11 Jordan Cotton WR; Refused to Report: 12 Rockne Belmonte K; -- Anthony Brown DL/LB; 6 Willie Carter WR; -- Nicholas Cooper RB; -- Spencer Ohm QB; Exempt List: currently vacant; Roster updated June 23, 2015; 27 Active, 6 Inactive → More rosters
