= Gabriel Knapton =

American gridiron football player (born 1989)

Profile
- Position: Defensive end

Personal information
- Born: May 10, 1989 (age 37); Mead, Colorado, U.S.
- Listed height: 6 ft 3 in (1.91 m)
- Listed weight: 263 lb (119 kg)

Career information
- High school: Skyline
- College: Wyoming
- NFL draft: 2012: undrafted

Career history
- Colorado Ice (2013); Montreal Alouettes (2014–2017); BC Lions (2018); Montreal Alouettes (2018–2019)

Awards and highlights
- First-team All-IFL (2013); CFL MOR nominee (2014); Second-team All-MWC (2011)

Career CFL statistics
- Tackles: 201
- Sacks: 36
- Forced fumbles: 2
- Stats at CFL.ca

Gabriel Knapton (born May 10, 1989) is an American former professional gridiron football defensive end. He played for the Montreal Alouettes of the Canadian Football League (CFL) from 2014 to 2019.

== College career ==
Knapton played college football for the Wyoming Cowboys from 2007 to 2011. He was named an All-Mountain West Conference Honorable Mention for the 2010 season. In 2011, Knapton was named Second Team All-Mountain West.

== Professional career ==
Knapton played for the Colorado Ice in 2013. In 11 regular season games, Knapton recorded 81 tackles and 9 sacks, and was recognized as a first team All-IFL player.

Knapton signed with the Montreal Alouettes in June 2014. Following a strong season for Montreal, Knapton was honored as the team's rookie of the year, and being nominated for the league rookie of the year in the process. Knapton recorded 9 sacks and a forced fumble, plus one more sack in the playoffs. Knapton had two more strong campaigns for Montreal, with 11 sacks in 2015 and 9 more in 2016.

2017 was a down year for Knapton statistically, with only 3 sacks in 17 games played. In December 2017, following the end of the season Montreal traded Knapton to the BC Lions in exchange for Chris Williams. Knapton played in 8 games for BC in 2018, recording 15 tackles, the first special teams tackle of his CFL career, and one more sack. However, after acquiring Shawn Lemon in a trade, BC released Knapton so as to avoid paying the remainder of his contract, which would have become guaranteed after one more week of play. Montreal signed Knapton back on August 27, to help make up for the loss of Jamaal Westerman in the Johnny Manziel trade, and injuries to Jabar Westerman. Knapton rebounded well in five games for Montreal, recording a sack in three consecutive games to end his season, as well as his 200th career tackle.

After several weeks of CFL free agency, Knapton signed a one-year extension with Montreal on April 4, 2019, coinciding with Jabar Westerman's release. However, by the end of training camp, Knapton was released by the Alouettes. Following the regular season, Knapton was signed back to Montreal's practice roster, later being activated to the active roster for the playoffs.
