= Elijah Fields =

American football player (born 1988)

No. 6
- Position: Defensive back / Linebacker

Personal information
- Born: July 10, 1988 (age 38); Pittsburgh, Pennsylvania, U.S.
- Listed height: 6 ft 2 in (1.88 m)
- Listed weight: 220 lb (100 kg)

Career information
- College: Pittsburgh
- NFL draft: 2011: undrafted

Career history
- Cedar Rapids Titans (2012); Green Bay Blizzard (2013–2014); Sioux Falls Storm (2015–2017)

Awards and highlights
- 2× United Bowl champion (2015, 2016); 3× Second Team All-IFL (2013, 2015, 2016)

Elijah Fields (born July 10, 1988) is a former professional American football defensive back. He played college football at the University of Pittsburgh. He has been a member of the Cedar Rapids Titans, Green Bay Blizzard and Sioux Falls Storm of the Indoor Football League (IFL).

== Early life ==
Fields went to Duquesne High School and played football, leading his team to the district championships and winning. Additionally, Fields broke several high school football records at his alma mater, and was subsequently named the "Nation's top 10 safety" by Scout.com in the United States. He was the first senior to gain more than 2,000 all-purpose yards and the first 1,000 yard receiver in school history. He also helped the team to the state title and championship game. Furthermore, after winning the championship, Fields was offered a full athletic scholarship to the University of Pittsburgh, which he accepted.

== College career ==
Fields was the favorite safety playing for the Pittsburgh Panthers in the NCAA. Despite being a freshman, the Panthers coach let Fields start. In his sophomore year, Fields left the team unexpectedly due to "unconfirmed disclipinary reasons".

== Professional career ==
Fields played for the Cedar Rapids Titans in 2012. After the season, he was traded to the Green Bay Blizzard. He played for the Blizzard from 2013 to 2014, earning Second Team All-IFL honors in 2013. He was also named the Blizzard's Defensive MVP in 2013. Fields has played for the Sioux Falls Storm since 2015, earning Second Team All-IFL accolades in 2015 and 2016. He also helped the Storm win the United Bowl in 2015 and 2016.

== Personal life ==
Fields has two children and currently volunteers in his local community coaching the West Mifflin Titans Middle School football team.
