= 2013 Green Bay Blizzard season =

Indoor Football League team season

- Owner: Titletown Football Group, LLC; Ahman Green
- Head coach: Robert Fuller (games 1–6); Chad Baldwin (games 7–present)
- Home stadium: Resch Center

Results
- Record: 4–10
- Division place: United Conference

The 2013 Green Bay Blizzard season was the team's eleventh season as a football franchise and fourth in the Indoor Football League (IFL). One of just nine teams competing in the IFL for the 2013 season, the Green Bay Blizzard were members of the United Conference. The team played their home games at the Resch Center in the Green Bay suburb of Ashwaubenon, Wisconsin.

The Blizzard began the season under the direction of head coach Robert Fuller but he was replaced after six games by Chad Baldwin. The team ended the regular season with a 4–10 record and did not qualify for the playoffs. They drew an average attendance of 3,812 for their seven regular season games. After failing to turn reach certain unspecified "financial benchmarks", three of the four principal owners of the team agreed to place the franchise for sale in June 2013. If a new owner had not been found by September 1, 2013, the franchise would have suspended operations for the 2014 IFL season.

== Off-field moves ==
Shortly before the 2013 season began, the owner of the Cheyenne Warriors died which forced that team to suspend operations and the IFL to revise its schedule to accommodate the now 9-team league.

The March 23, 2013, game against the Chicago Slaughter was "Military Appreciation Night" with free tickets for veterans and all fans in attendance received a personal American flag. Children also received replicas of the special "camouflage" Blizzard jersey.

After the April 7th loss dropped the team's record to 1–5, head coach Robert Fuller was fired and defensive coordinator Chad Baldwin was promoted to replace him.

== Roster moves ==
Junior Aumavae, a nose tackle who spent the 2012 season playing for the Blizzard, was signed by the New York Jets in late March 2013.

== Schedule ==
Key: Win Tie Loss Bye

=== Preseason ===
Week	Day	Date	Kickoff	Opponent	Results		Location
Week	Day	Date	Kickoff	Opponent	Final Score	Record	Location
1	Thursday	February 7	7:05pm	at Cedar Rapids Titans	W 67–47	1–0	Cedar Rapids Ice Arena

=== Regular season ===
Week	Day	Date	Kickoff	Opponent	Results		Location
Week	Day	Date	Kickoff	Opponent	Final Score	Record	Location
1	Friday	February 15	7:30pm	Sioux Falls Storm	L 41–64	0–1	Resch Center
2	BYE						
3	Saturday	March 2	6:07pm	at Chicago Slaughter	L 41–50	0–2	Sears Centre
4	BYE						
5	Sunday	March 17	3:00pm	at Colorado Ice	L 20–24	0–3	Budweiser Events Center
6	Saturday	March 23	7:00pm	Chicago Slaughter	L 14–27	0–4	Resch Center
7	Saturday	March 30	7:05pm	at Cedar Rapids Titans	W 41–38	1–4	Cedar Rapids Ice Arena
8	Sunday	April 7	3:05pm	at Sioux Falls Storm	L 29–48	1–5	Sioux Falls Arena
9	BYE						
10	Saturday	April 20	7:00pm	Tri-Cities Fever	W 66–54	2–5	Resch Center
11	Saturday	April 27	7:05pm	Texas Revolution	W 74–25	3–5	Resch Center
12	BYE						
13	Friday	May 10	7:30pm	Nebraska Danger	W 53–47	4–5	Resch Center
14	Saturday	May 18	7:00pm	Cedar Rapids Titans	L 37–54	4–6	Resch Center
15	Saturday	May 25	7:05pm	at Texas Revolution	L 56–60	4–7	Allen Event Center
16	Friday	May 31	7:35pm	at Chicago Slaughter	L 51–52	4–8	Sears Centre
17	Saturday	June 8	7:05pm	at Cedar Rapids Titans	L 42–49	4–9	Cedar Rapids Ice Arena
18	Saturday	June 15	7:00pm	Chicago Slaughter	L 57–60	4–10	Resch Center

== Roster ==
2013 Green Bay Blizzard roster
Quarterback: 6 Spencer Ohm; 15 Donovan Porterie; Running backs: 33 Levell Coppage; 34 Joel Yogerst; Wide receivers: 10 Ryan Balentine; 2 Charles Dowdell; 7 Aaron Kapeliela-Higdon; -- Daryl Robinson; 18 Marquel Willis	Offensive linemen: 50 Bryan Brooks; 70 Tyler Hendrickson; 66 Kyle McManus; Defensive linemen: 55 Lebron Daniel; 99 Maurice Hampton; 97 Tim Hume; 92 James McClinton	Linebacker: 42 Derek Earls; Defensive backs: 13 C. J. Bailey; 11 Darius Davis; 14 Elijah Fields; 3 B. J. Hill; 21 Timothy Shelley II; 9 Dequan Starling; -- Kenny Viser; Kicker: 19 Jordan Wettstein	Injured reserve: Currently vacant; Exempt list: Currently vacant; Practice squad: Currently vacant; Rookies in italics Roster updated March 26, 2013; 25 Active, 0 Inactive, 0 PS

== Standings ==
2013 United Conference
	W	L	T	PCT	PF	PA	DIV	GB	STK
y - Sioux Falls Storm	10	4	0	.714	645	500	4-2	0.0	W3
x - Cedar Rapids Titans	9	5	0	.643	744	569	6-4	1.0	w2
Chicago Slaughter	9	5	0	.643	598	602	6-5	1.0	W2
Texas Revolution	5	9	0	.357	563	747	3-4	6.0	L2
Green Bay Blizzard	4	10	0	.286	622	652	2-6	6.0	L5
