= 2013 Chicago Slaughter season =

Indoor Football League team season

- Owner: Jim McMahon
- Head coach: Steve McMichael
- Home stadium: Sears Centre

Results
- Record: 8–5
- Division place: United Conference
- Playoffs: did not qualify

The 2013 Chicago Slaughter season was the team's seventh season as a football franchise and fourth in the Indoor Football League (IFL). One of just nine teams competing in the IFL for the 2013 season, the Chicago Slaughter were members of the United Conference. Led by longtime head coach Steve "Mongo" McMichael, the team played their home games at the Sears Centre in Hoffman Estates, Illinois.

The team earned a 9–5 regular season record but struggled financially. Delayed paychecks led coach McMichael and several players to refuse the final road game of the season, forcing the Slaughter to fill out their roster with semi-pro players from Wisconsin and former members of the Green Bay Blizzard.

== Off-field moves ==
Promotional events scheduled for the 2013 season include a "red out" with fans encouraged to wear red to the home opener on February 24, a Star Wars theme night on March 2, a St. Patrick's Day celebration on March 17, a "Halfway to Halloween" event with fans encouraged to wear costumes and trick-or-treating for children on April 6, "Heroes and Villains" night with appearances by comic book characters on April 27, Military Appreciation Night on May 11, and Fan Appreciation Night at the final home game on May 31.

Shortly before the 2013 season began, the owner of the Cheyenne Warriors died which forced that team to suspend operations and the IFL to revise its schedule to accommodate the now 9-team league.

In August 2012, Slaughter head coach Steve "Mongo" McMichael declared his candidacy for mayor of Romeoville, Illinois. After a difficult campaign, McMichael was defeated in the April 2013 election by incumbent mayor John Noak.

== Schedule ==
Key: Win Tie Loss Bye

=== Regular season ===
Week	Day	Date	Kickoff	Opponent	Results		Location
Week	Day	Date	Kickoff	Opponent	Final Score	Record	Location
1	Saturday	February 16	7:05pm	at Cedar Rapids Titans	L 31–41	0–1	Cedar Rapids Ice Arena
2	Sunday	February 24	2:40pm	Cedar Rapids Titans	L 52–58	0–2	Sears Centre
3	Saturday	March 2	6:07pm	Green Bay Blizzard	W 50–41	1–2	Sears Centre
4	BYE						
5	Sunday	March 17	2:05pm	Texas Revolution	W 51–26	2–2	Sears Centre
6	Friday	March 22	7:00pm	at Green Bay Blizzard	W 50–41	3–2	Resch Center
7	BYE						
8	Saturday	April 6	6:05pm	Cedar Rapids Titans	W 50–45	4–2	Sears Centre
9	Friday	April 12	7:05pm	at Wyoming Cavalry	W 33–20	5–2	Casper Events Center
10	Saturday	April 20	7:05pm	at Cedar Rapids Titans	L 28–62	5–3	Cedar Rapids Ice Arena
11	Saturday	April 27	6:05pm	Sioux Falls Storm	W 61–56	6–3	Sears Centre
12	Friday	May 3	7:05pm	at Texas Revolution	L 23–48	6–4	Allen Event Center
13	Saturday	May 11	6:05pm	Texas Revolution	W 42–30	7–4	Sears Centre
14	Saturday	May 18	7:05pm	at Sioux Falls Storm	L 38–53	7–5	Sioux Falls Arena
15	BYE						
16	Friday	May 31	7:35pm	Green Bay Blizzard	W 52–51	8–5	Sears Centre
17	BYE						
18	Saturday	June 15	7:00pm	at Green Bay Blizzard	W 60–57	9-5	Resch Center

== Roster ==
2013 Chicago Slaughter roster
Quarterbacks: 13 Cody Kirby; 7 Juice Williams; Running backs: 3 Daniel DuFrene; 30 Kevin Morris; Wide receivers: 9 John Cooper; 10 Delric Ellington; 5 Christopher James	Offensive linemen: 72 Jason Baksas; 67 Kevin Gall; 75 Michael Johnson; 77 Tim Mueller; Defensive linemen: 71 Yemi Babalola; 95 Kyle Jenkins; 1 Madison Miller III; 54 P. J. South; 55 Kyle Thomas	Linebackers: 43 Ismail Ameer; 8 Lenny Radtke; Defensive backs: 24 Kwame Agyeman; 20 Will Billingsley; 2 Jereme Green; 12 Chris Johnson; 23 Robert Mago; 6 Chris Rodgers; Kickers: 25 Chris Nendick	Injured Reserve: currently vacant; Exempt List: currently vacant; Practice squad: currently vacant; Roster updated March 26, 2013; 26 Active, 0 Inactive, 0 PS → More rosters

== Standings ==
2013 United Conference
	W	L	T	PCT	PF	PA	DIV	GB	STK
y - Sioux Falls Storm	10	4	0	.714	645	500	4-2	0.0	W3
x - Cedar Rapids Titans	9	5	0	.643	744	569	6-4	1.0	w2
Chicago Slaughter	9	5	0	.643	598	602	6-5	1.0	W2
Texas Revolution	5	9	0	.357	563	747	3-4	6.0	L2
Green Bay Blizzard	4	10	0	.286	622	652	2-6	6.0	L5
