= 2013 Wyoming Cavalry season =

Indoor Football League team season

- Owner: Mike and Argeri Layton
- General manager: Mike Layton
- Head coach: Ryan Lingenfelder
- Home stadium: Casper Events Center

Results
- Record: 1–13
- Division place: 4th, Intense
- Playoffs: did not qualify

The 2013 Wyoming Cavalry season is the team's fourteenth season as a football franchise and third in the current Indoor Football League (IFL). One of just nine teams competing in the IFL for the 2013 season, the Wyoming Cavalry are members of the Intense Conference. Led by head coach Ryan Lingenfelder, the team plays their home games at the Casper Events Center in Casper, Wyoming.

== Off-field moves ==
For the 2013 season, the Cavalry hired rookie head coach Ryan Lingenfelder to replace longtime head coach Dan "Majic" Maciejczak. Lingenfelder served as defensive coordinator of the Tri-Cities Fever for the previous three seasons.

Shortly before the 2013 season began, the owner of the Cheyenne Warriors died which forced that team to suspend operations and the IFL to revise its schedule to accommodate the now 9-team league. The Cavalry had been scheduled to play two games against the projected in-state rival.

The April 5 game against the Tri-Cities Fever was promoted as Meals on Wheels Drivers & Staff Appreciation Night. The May 3 game against the Colorado Ice was "Feed Casper Night" and Helping the Natrona County Homeless Children. The May 11 game against Tri-Cities was "Fly Casper Night" plus a "Ladies Wine Tasting & Fundraiser" for Crossroads Kitchen. The May 31 home finale versus the Cedar Rapids Titans will be "Breast Cancer Awareness Night".

== Roster moves ==
Barney O'Donnell III, a former St. Ambrose University standout and 2006 Cedar Rapids Gazette Athlete of the Year, joined the Cavalry to start the 2013 season as the team's primary quarterback.

== Schedule ==
Key: Win Tie Loss Bye

=== Regular season ===
Week	Day	Date	Kickoff	Opponent	Results		Location
Week	Day	Date	Kickoff	Opponent	Final Score	Record	Location
1	BYE						
2	BYE						
3	BYE						
4	Friday	March 8	7:05pm	at Cedar Rapids Titans	L 12–54	0–1	Cedar Rapids Ice Arena
5	Sunday	March 17	3:05pm	at Sioux Falls Storm	L 7–67	0–2	Sioux Falls Arena
6	Friday	March 22	7:00pm	at Nebraska Danger	L 35–62	0–3	Eihusen Arena
7	Friday	March 29	7:05pm	Colorado Ice	L 36–54	0–4	Casper Events Center
8	Friday	April 5	7:05pm	Tri-Cities Fever	W 36–34	1–4	Casper Events Center
9	Friday	April 12	7:05pm	Chicago Slaughter	L 20–33	1–5	Casper Events Center
10	BYE						
11	Friday	April 26	7:05pm	at Tri-Cities Fever	L 31–57	1–6	Toyota Center
12	Friday	May 3	7:05pm	Colorado Ice	L 41–51	1–7	Casper Events Center
13	Saturday	May 11	7:05pm	Tri-Cities Fever	L16–33	1–8	Casper Events Center
14	Friday	May 17	7:05pm	Nebraska Danger	L 53–82	1–9	Casper Events Center
15	Friday	May 24	7:00pm	at Nebraska Danger	L 42–69	1–10	Eihusen Arena
16	Friday	May 31	7:05pm	Cedar Rapids Titans	L 55–67	1–11	Casper Events Center
17	Saturday	June 8	7:05pm	at Tri-Cities Fever	L 6–33	1–12	Toyota Center
18	Saturday	June 15	6:00pm	at Colorado Ice	L 43–58	1–13	Budweiser Events Center

== Roster ==
2013 Wyoming Cavalry roster
Quarterbacks: 2 Brendan Crawford; 14 Stephen Panasuk; Running backs: 3 Ryan Dinnebeil; 1 Aaron Mason; Wide receivers: 4 Troy Evans; 7 Jake Johnson; 9 Mark Henderson; 84 Maurice Patterson	Offensive linemen: 63 Terrance Clark; 78 Fred Koloto; 66 Walter Stuller; Defensive linemen: 77 Mackenzie Jacobs; -- Bryson Kelly; 91 Yahchaaroah Lightbourne; 75 Shane McCord; 92 Dane Robinson	Linebackers: 10 Bruna' Foster; 41 Paul Vassallo; Defensive backs: 17 Jaquan Bryant; 20 Khalid Harris; 21 DeWayne Lewis; 35 Angelo Looney; 25 Abraham Woodard; Kickers: 8 Josiah Powell	Injured Reserve: currently vacant; Exempt List: currently vacant; Practice squad: currently vacant; rookies in italics Roster updated June 12, 2013; 24 Active, 0 Inactive, 0 PS → More rosters

== Standings ==
2013 Intense Conference
	W	L	T	PCT	PF	PA	DIV	GB	STK
y - Nebraska Danger	10	4	0	0.714	767	655	5-2	0.0	W4
x - Colorado Ice	9	5	0	0.643	651	579	5-3	1.0	L1
Tri-Cities Fever	6	8	0	0.429	626	591	4-4	4.0	W1
Wyoming Cavalry	1	13	0	0.071	433	754	1-7	9.0	L9
