= 2013 Cedar Rapids Titans season =

Indoor Football League team season

- Owner: Chris Kokalis; Bob Sullivan; Mike Polaski; Angelique Wonders; Kenneth Moninski
- General manager: Chris Kokalis
- Head coach: Mark Stoute
- Home stadium: Cedar Rapids Ice Arena; Cedar Rapids, Iowa

Results
- Record: 9–5
- Division place: United Conference
- Playoffs: Lost Conference Championship

The 2013 Cedar Rapids Titans season was the second season of the Cedar Rapids Titans as a football franchise in the Indoor Football League (IFL). One of just nine teams competing in the IFL for the 2013 season, the Cedar Rapids Titans were members of the league's United Conference. The team played their home games at the Cedar Rapids Ice Arena in Cedar Rapids, Iowa. The Titans had been scheduled to play this season in the renovated U.S. Cellular Center but construction delays kept that building from re-opening during the 2013 IFL season.

== Off-field moves ==
All Titans games, home and away, were broadcast live on WMT-FM (95.7 FM) this season. Play-by-play duties were split by local radio hosts Dan Egger and Jon Swisher plus Jarod Aarons doing color commentary during home games. In addition, home games were televised on a tape-delay via Mediacom's MC22 with Rob Brooks and Jerry Kiwala calling the action. Local media coverage included a weekly wrap-up show titled Titans Extra hosted by Rob Brooks, head coach Mark Stoute, and general manager Chris Kokalis.

Shortly before the 2013 season began, the owner of the Cheyenne Warriors died and the IFL revised its schedule to accommodate the now 9-team league.

On March 4, 2013, minority owner Mike Polaski placed an advertisement on Craigslist offering his 20 percent stake in the Titans for sale. The restaurateur cited a "downturn in [his] core business" for seeking $80,000 for his fifth of the team's shares. The ad was taken down after local media reports about the sale.

== Roster moves ==
The coaching staff for 2013 included head coach Mark Stoute and assistant coaches Sean Ponder, Michael Custer, and Ed Flanagan.

== Schedule ==
Key: Win Tie Loss Bye

=== Preseason ===
Week	Day	Date	Kickoff	Opponent	Results		Location
Week	Day	Date	Kickoff	Opponent	Score	Record	Location
1	Thursday	February 7	7:05pm	Green Bay Blizzard	L 47–67	0–1	Cedar Rapids Ice Arena

=== Regular season ===
Week	Day	Date	Kickoff	Opponent	Results		Location
Week	Day	Date	Kickoff	Opponent	Score	Record	Location
1	Saturday	February 16	6:05pm	Chicago Slaughter	W 41–31	1–0	Cedar Rapids Ice Arena
2	Sunday	February 23	2:05pm	at Chicago Slaughter	W 58–52	2–0	Sears Centre
3	Friday	March 1	7:05pm	Texas Revolution	W 60–21	3–0	Cedar Rapids Ice Arena
4	Friday	March 8	7:05pm	Wyoming Cavalry	W 54–12	4–0	Cedar Rapids Ice Arena
5	BYE						
6	BYE						
7	Saturday	March 30	7:05pm	Green Bay Blizzard	L 38–41 (2OT)	4–1	Cedar Rapids Ice Arena
8	Saturday	April 6	6:05pm	at Chicago Slaughter	L 45–50	4–2	Sears Centre
9	Saturday	April 13	7:05pm	at Texas Revolution	L 72–82	4–3	Allen Event Center
10	Saturday	April 20	6:05pm	Chicago Slaughter	W 62–28	5–3	Cedar Rapids Ice Arena
11	BYE						
12	Saturday	May 4	7:05pm	at Tri-Cities Fever	L 68–70	5–4	Toyota Center
13	Saturday	May 11	7:05pm	Sioux Falls Storm	W 52–18	6–4	Cedar Rapids Ice Arena
14	Saturday	May 18	7:05pm	at Green Bay Blizzard	W 54–37	7–4	Resch Center
15	Saturday	May 25	6:05pm	at Sioux Falls Storm	L 24–30	7–5	Sioux Falls Arena
16	Friday	May 31	6:05pm	at Wyoming Cavalry	W 67–55	8–5	Casper Events Center
17	Saturday	June 8	7:05pm	Green Bay Blizzard	W 49–42	9–5	Cedar Rapids Ice Arena
18	BYE						

=== Post-season ===
Round	Day	Date	Kickoff	Opponent	Results		Location
Round	Day	Date	Kickoff	Opponent	Score	Record	Location
United Conference Championship	Saturday	June 22	7:05pm	at Sioux Falls Storm	L 20–44	9–6	Sioux Falls Arena

== Roster ==
2013 Cedar Rapids Titans roster
Quarterbacks: 10 Colton Hansen; -- Timothy Curry; Running backs: 23 Anthony Silvers; Wide receivers: 9 Bryan Pray; 4 Carl Sims; 7 Desmond Tardy	Offensive linemen: 67 Courtney Abbott; 75 Albert Erni Jr.; 72 Maurice Robinson; -- Brody Dixon; Defensive linemen: 52 Robert Jackson; 93 Xzavie Jackson; 90 Richard Posey	Linebackers: 19 Courtney Daniels; -- Vernard Wilkins; Defensive backs: 23 Cashmin Thomas; 17 Travonti Johnson; 3 Ricky Johnson; 28 T. J. Simmons; Kickers: 12 Rockne Belmonte	Injured Reserve: 1 Charles McCullum QB (IR); 6 LaRon Council RB (IR); 38 Michael Graise DL (IR); Refuse To Report: currently vacant; Roster updated June 20, 2013; 20 Active, 3 Inactive → More rosters

== Standings ==
2013 United Conference
	W	L	T	PCT	PF	PA	DIV	GB	STK
y - Sioux Falls Storm	10	4	0	.714	645	500	4-2	0.0	W3
x - Cedar Rapids Titans	9	5	0	.643	744	569	6-4	1.0	w2
Chicago Slaughter	9	5	0	.643	598	602	6-5	1.0	W2
Texas Revolution	5	9	0	.357	563	747	3-4	6.0	L2
Green Bay Blizzard	4	10	0	.286	622	652	2-6	6.0	L5
