= Justin Edison =

American football player (born 1989)

No. 29, 30, 99
- Position: Defensive end

Personal information
- Born: March 18, 1989 (age 37); Los Angeles, California, U.S.
- Listed height: 6 ft 4 in (1.93 m)
- Listed weight: 265 lb (120 kg)

Career information
- High school: Los Angeles (CA) Verbum Dei
- College: UCLA
- NFL draft: 2012: undrafted

Career history
- San Jose SaberCats (2013)*; Orlando Predators (2014); Nebraska Danger (2014); Tampa Bay Storm (2016)
- * Offseason or practice squad member only

Awards and highlights
- Second Team All-IFL (2015)

Career AFL statistics
- Total tackles: 20.5
- Stats at ArenaFan.com

Justin Edison (born March 18, 1989) is an American former football defensive end. He played college football for University of California, Los Angeles.

== Professional career ==
=== San Jose SaberCats ===
On May 20, 2013, Edison was assigned to the SaberCats. Edison did not appear in any games for the SaberCats during the 2013 season. On September 6, 2013, the SaberCats picked up Edison's rookie option for the 2014 season.

=== Orlando Predators ===
On January 16, 2014, Edison was traded to the Orlando Predators for Jarvis Williams.

=== Nebraska Danger ===
On June 12, 2014, Edison signed with the Nebraska Danger of the Indoor Football League.

=== Tampa Bay Storm ===
On November 10, 2015, Edison was assigned to the Tampa Bay Storm.
