= William Back =

William Back may refer to:

- William Back (cricketer) (c.1856–1911), Australian cricketer
- William Back (geologist) (1925–2008), American geologist at U.S. Geological Survey
