= 2013 Texas Revolution season =

Indoor Football League team season

- Owner: Championship Sports Group
- General manager: Tim Brown
- Head coach: Billy Back
- Home stadium: Allen Event Center

Results
- Record: 5–9
- Division place: United Conference

The 2013 Texas Revolution season was the team's fourteenth season as a football franchise, fourth in the Indoor Football League (IFL), and first as the "Texas Revolution". One of just nine teams competing in the IFL for the 2013 season, the Texas Revolution were realigned to the United Conference. The team played their home games at the Allen Event Center in Allen, Texas. Head coach Billy Back led the team to a 5–9 record and they failed to qualify for post-season play.

== Off-field moves ==
A new ownership group, led by team president and chief executive officer Tommy Benizio, took control of the Dallas-area franchise after the 2012 season but the previous ownership retained the rights to the "Allen Wranglers" name and logo. The new owners held a "Name Your Team" contest and awarded $5,000 to Todd Carlson of Plano, Texas, for his winning entry. The Championship Sports Group includes Benizio, NFL legend Tim Brown, and Texas politician Ken Paxton.

On November 8, 2012, the team announced the hiring of Billy Back as head coach for the 2012-13 season. Back spent the previous three seasons leading the Cincinnati Commandos to three consecutive league championships. Before coaching, Back played six seasons in the NIFL, af2, and IFL. On the same day, the Revolution hired Brian Wells as defensive coordinator. Wells had served as an assistant coach under Back in Cincinnati. On December 18, 2012, the rest of the coaching staff was announced. IFL veteran Brandon Blackmon was named defensive backs coach, local Bryan Raymond was named offensive line coach, and NFL veteran Taurean Henderson signed on as the running backs coach.

Shortly before the 2013 season began, the owner of the Cheyenne Warriors died and the IFL revised its schedule to accommodate the now 9-team league. While the Revolution had not been scheduled to play Cheyenne, the revisions altered the latter half of their game schedule.

== Roster moves ==
In October 2012, the team announced a number of player signings, just ahead of the announcement of the team's 2013 schedule. These include former Allen High School players Nathan Dick at quarterback and Brett Peddicord as a kicker. Dick had been a standout for the University of Central Arkansas and on the Dallas Cowboys training camp roster following the 2012 NFL draft. Peddicord was a preseason All-American at East Texas Baptist University his senior year before kicking professionally for the Warsaw Eagles of the Polish American Football League.

At the same time, the team announced the signings of University of Texas alums RB Vondrell McGee and DL Brian Ellis plus ETBU alum DB Anquanius "Huggie" Frazier. Also signed were Ohio State alums DB E.J. Underwood and OL Zach Slagle, Michigan State alum DB Enrique Shaw, plus Florida State alum and NFL veteran DB Michael Ray Garvin. Signees with IFL experience include Ellis and Frazier who played with the Allen Wranglers in 2012, OL Zac Tubbs formerly of the Sioux Falls Storm plus DB Scooter Rogers and QB Marcus Jackson who both played for the Wichita Wild.

The Revolution held on open tryout at the Blue Sky Indoor Soccer Facility in Allen, Texas, on November 11, 2012. The team signed eight players as a result, including Darien Williams from the University of Oklahoma, Kedrick Alexander and Shawn Santos from the University of Tulsa, Justin Siller and Keith Smith from Purdue University, and former Allen Wrangler player Jeremy Brown. In early December 2012, the team announced the signings of Mon Williams from the Florida, Anthony Kelly from Florida State, Jermaine Love from Arkansas, Eddrick Loften from Tennessee, John Mobley from Winston-Salem State, and Simon Collier from Alcorn State.

On December 18, 2012, the team announced the signing of defensive lineman Wayne Daniels, formerly of the TCU Horned Frogs. Daniels was a First Team All-American and two-time All Mountain West Conference player during his college years and played in several pre-season games for the New York Jets after turning pro.

The team scheduled a second tryout for February 2, 2013, at the same facility in Allen. The team's training camp began with 40 players on Saturday, February 9, 2012, in advance of their first pre-season game on February 21, 2013. On February 20, 2013, the team announced its final 30-man roster, cutting several players including local quarterback hopeful Nathan Dick.

== Awards and honors ==
Defensive back Frankie Solomon Jr., described by press reports as the "face of the franchise", was named to the All-IFL first team defense and the All-IFL second team special teams roster in late June 2013. He was the only player in the league to be named twice to the 2013 All-IFL team.

== Schedule ==
Key: Win Tie Loss Bye

=== Preseason ===
Week	Day	Date	Kickoff	Opponent	Results		Location
Week	Day	Date	Kickoff	Opponent	Final Score	Record	Location
1	Thursday	February 21	7:05pm	North Texas Crunch (APFL)	W 103–22	1–0	Allen Event Center

=== Regular season ===
Week	Day	Date	Kickoff	Opponent	Results		Location
Week	Day	Date	Kickoff	Opponent	Final Score	Record	Location
1	BYE						
2	BYE						
3	Friday	March 1	7:05pm	at Cedar Rapids Titans	L 21–60	0–1	Cedar Rapids Ice Arena
4	BYE						
5	Sunday	March 17	2:05pm	at Chicago Slaughter	L 26–51	0–2	Sears Centre
6	Friday	March 22	7:05pm	Tri-Cities Fever	W 40–37	1–2	Allen Event Center
7	Friday	March 29	7:05pm	at Tri-Cities Fever	W 54–43	2–2	Toyota Center
8	Saturday	April 6	7:00pm	at Nebraska Danger	L 50–53	2–3	Eihusen Arena
9	Saturday	April 13	7:05pm	Cedar Rapids Titans	W 82–72	3–3	Allen Event Center
10	Saturday	April 20	7:05pm	Nebraska Danger	L 47–62	3–4	Allen Event Center
11	Saturday	April 27	7:05pm	at Green Bay Blizzard	L 25–74	3–5	Resch Center
12	Friday	May 3	7:05pm	Chicago Slaughter	W 48–23	4–5	Allen Event Center
13	Saturday	May 11	6:05pm	at Chicago Slaughter	L 30–42	4–6	Sears Centre
14	BYE						
15	Saturday	May 25	7:05pm	Green Bay Blizzard	W 60–56	5–6	Allen Event Center
16	Saturday	June 1	7:05pm	Colorado Ice	L 26–63	5–7	Allen Event Center
17	Saturday	June 8	7:05pm	at Sioux Falls Storm	L 16–59	5–8	Sioux Falls Arena
18	Saturday	June 15	7:05pm	Sioux Falls Storm	L 38–52	5–9	Allen Event Center

== Roster ==
2013 Texas Revolution roster
Quarterbacks: 12 Kewan Dewberry; 5 Marcus Jackson; Running backs: 2 Vondrell McGee; 11 Ramonce Taylor; 1 Mon Williams; Wide receivers: 10 Phillip Barnett; 27 Jeremy Brown; 18 Nate Jones; 8 Justin Siller; 9 Keith Smith	Offensive linemen: 77 James Barker; 79 J. T. Brooks; 69 Dimecus Brown; 61 Tommy Crowley; Defensive linemen: 19 Wayne Daniels; 80 Brian Ellis; 7 James Frazier; 93 Prince Hickman; 55 Darrell Roseman; 65 Eliot Allen	Linebackers: 52 A. J. Nicholson; 17 Anthony Kelly; Defensive backs: 21 Brett Bowers; 3 Eugene Clifford; 24 Anquanius Frazier; 6 Scooter Rogers; 15 Frankie Solomon Jr.; 4 E. J. Underwood; 41 Darien Williams; Kickers: 16 Brett Peddicord	Injured Reserve: currently vacant; Exempt List: currently vacant; Practice squad: currently vacant; rookies in italics Roster updated February 21, 2013; 30 Active, 0 Inactive, 0 PS → More rosters

== Standings ==
2013 United Conference
	W	L	T	PCT	PF	PA	DIV	GB	STK
y - Sioux Falls Storm	10	4	0	.714	645	500	4-2	0.0	W3
x - Cedar Rapids Titans	9	5	0	.643	744	569	6-4	1.0	w2
Chicago Slaughter	9	5	0	.643	598	602	6-5	1.0	W2
Texas Revolution	5	9	0	.357	563	747	3-4	6.0	L2
Green Bay Blizzard	4	10	0	.286	622	652	2-6	6.0	L5
