= 2015 Green Bay Blizzard season =

Indoor Football League team season

- Owner: Larry Treankler; Kathy Treankler; Ahman Green
- Head coach: Tommie Williams
- Home stadium: Resch Center; 1901 South Oneida Street; Green Bay, Wisconsin 54304

Results
- Record: 6-8
- Conference place: 3rd
- Playoffs: did not qualify

The 2015 Green Bay Blizzard season was the team's thirteenth season as a professional indoor football franchise and sixth in the Indoor Football League (IFL). One of ten teams competing in the IFL for the 2015 season, the Green Bay Blizzard were members of the United Conference. The team played their home games at the Resch Center in the Green Bay suburb of Ashwaubenon, Wisconsin.

== Schedule ==
Key: Win Tie Loss Bye

=== Regular season ===
All start times are local time

Week	Day	Date	Kickoff	Opponent	Results		Location	Attendance
Week	Day	Date	Kickoff	Opponent	Score	Record	Location	Attendance
1	Sunday	March 1	3:00pm	Nebraska Danger	L 32-57	0-1	Resch Center	2,314
2	BYE							
3	Saturday	March 14	7:05pm	at Tri-Cities Fever	W 71-63	1-1	Toyota Center	4,499
4	Sunday	March 22	3:00pm	Iowa Barnstormers	W 47-46	2-1	Resch Center	2,833
5	Sunday	March 29	3:00pm	Bemidji Axemen	L 54-55	2-2	Resch Center	3,600
6	BYE							
7	Saturday	April 11	7:05pm	at Iowa Barnstormers	L 64-75	2-3	Wells Fargo Arena	6,176
8	Saturday	April 18	6:00pm	Billings Wolves	L 37-56	2-4	Resch Center	3,846
9	Saturday	April 25	7:05pm	at Cedar Rapids Titans	W 52-49	3-4	U.S. Cellular Center	4,172
10	Saturday	May 2	7:05pm	at Bemidji Axemen	W 55-28	4-4	Sanford Center	2,135
11	Friday	May 8	7:05pm	at Sioux Falls Storm	L 35-56	4-5	Denny Sanford PREMIER Center	7,110
12	Saturday	May 16	6:00pm	Wichita Falls Nighthawks	W 37-36	5-5	Resch Center	2,478
13	Saturday	May 23	7:00pm	at Wichita Falls Nighthawks	W 41-31	6-5	Kay Yeager Coliseum	2,604
14	Saturday	May 30	6:00pm	Cedar Rapids Titans	L 32-50	6-6	Resch Center	2,582
15	BYE							
16	Saturday	June 13	6:00pm	Sioux Falls Storm	L 31-75	6-7	Resch Center	NA
17	Saturday	June 20	7:05pm	at Iowa Barnstormers	L 32-38	6-8	Wells Fargo Arena	7,059

== Standings ==
2015 United Conference
	W	L	T	PCT	PF	PA	GB	STK
y-Sioux Falls Storm	14	0	0	1.000	884	481	--	W14
x-Cedar Rapids Titans	9	5	0	.643	642	487	5.0	L1
Green Bay Blizzard	6	8	0	.429	620	715	8.0	L3
Iowa Barnstormers	6	8	0	.429	528	631	8.0	W1
Bemidji Axemen	2	12	0	.143	449	803	12.0	L10

== Roster ==
2015 Green Bay Blizzard roster
Quarterback: 15 Donovan Porterie; Running back: 5 Garrick Hall; Wide receiver: 13 Joe Green; 6 Andre London; 1 Donte Sawyer; 4 Carl Sims	Offensive linemen: -- Ronald Johnson; 70 Isaiah Shelton; 55 Larry Westphal; Defensive linemen: 50 Jimmy Daniels; 94 Danny Farr; 79 Bryan Keys; 33 Brandon McKinney; 69 Kenneth Woodget	Linebacker: 42 Jamil Moore; 18 Allen Walker; Defensive back: 24 Jamie Bender; -- Shawn Billups; 12 Tyler Phillips; 7 Kenneth Ridley; 22 Brandon Turman; Special teams: 19 Jeff Budzien	Reserve lists: -- Kahlil Bass LB (Exempt); 11 Courtney Daniel LB (IR); 92 Derek Earls LB (IR); 97 V. J. Holmes DL (IR); 21 Dontrell Johnson DB (IR); 5 Ricardo Johnson WR (IR); 8 Avonte Jones WR (IR); 74 D'Angelo McCray OL (IR); 70 Kadre Pinder OL (IR); 2 Markeith Summers WR (IR); 77 Keyun Swinney OL (IR); 99 Noah Taylor DL (IR); 9 Marquel Willis WR (IR); Rookies in italics Roster updated June 18, 2015; 22 Active, 13 Inactive → More rosters
