= Cordera Eason =

American football player (born 1987)

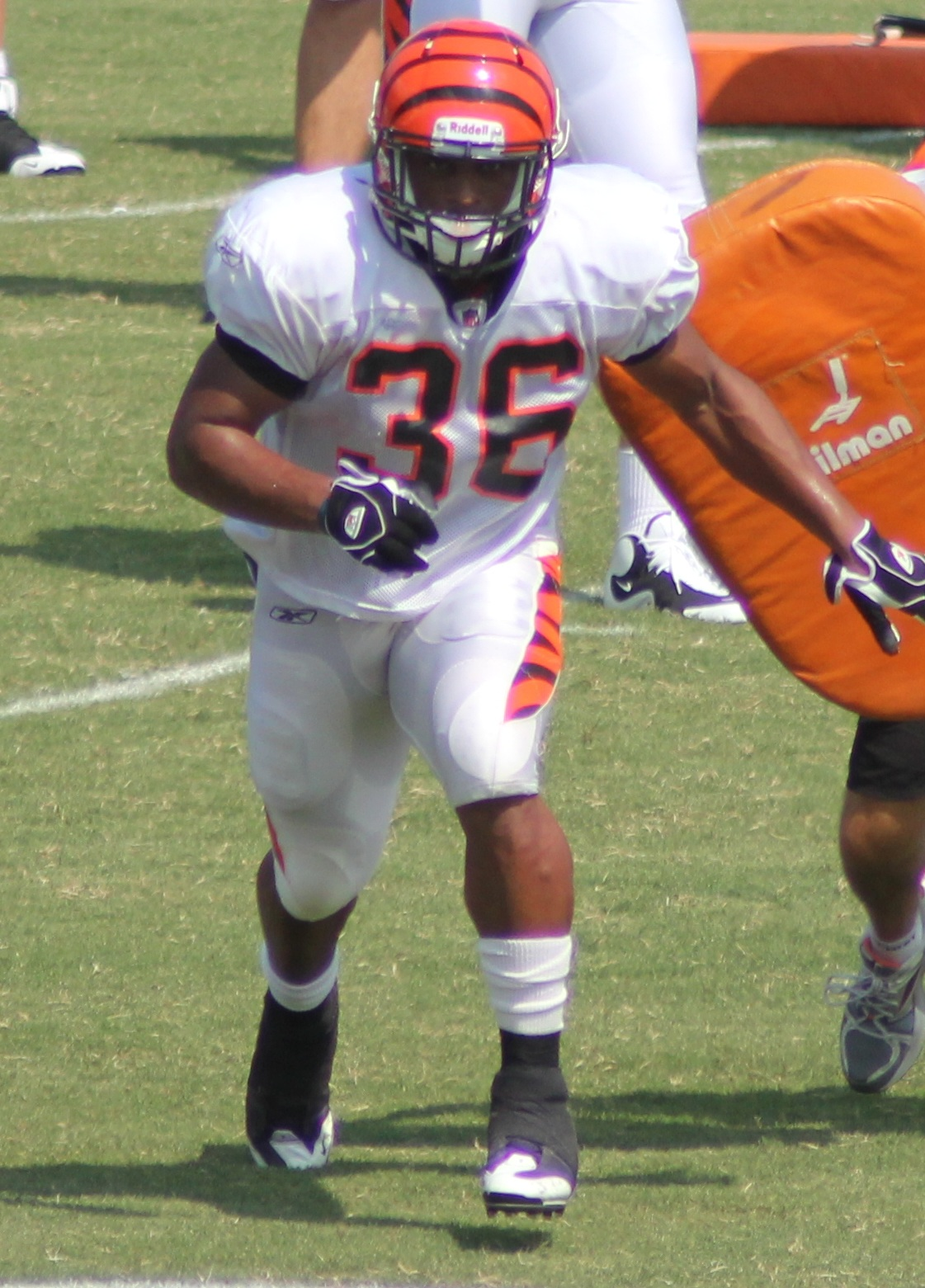
- Eason in training camp with the Cincinnati Bengals in 2010.

No. 28
- Position: Running back

Personal information
- Born: September 7, 1987 (age 39); Meridian, Mississippi
- Listed height: 6 ft 0 in (1.83 m)
- Listed weight: 240 lb (109 kg)

Career information
- College: Ole Miss

Career history
- Cincinnati Bengals (2010)*
- * Offseason or practice squad member only

Cordera Eason (born September 7, 1987) is an American football running back, athletic trainer and coach. He played college football at Ole Miss from 2006-2009. He was signed by the Cincinnati Bengals in 2010 but his career was cut short due to an injury. In 2015, Eason returned to Ole Miss to finish his Bachelor's in Social Work and serve as a student coach for the Ole Miss Rebels Football Team. Eason served two years as the Offensive Head Coach for Magnolia Middle School and three years as the Running Back coach for Meridian High School. In 2017, Eason partnered with college and high school teammate Derrick Davis to create the athletic training business Elite Technique. He is a former assistant baseball coach and current assistant football and track coach for the Lamar Raiders, and a Field Ambassador for the Fellowship of Christian Athletes. He is married to Rankin Jordan Eason and has four children.
