= Brady Beeson =

American football player (born 1987)

Spokane Empire
- Position: Placekicker
- Roster status: Active

Personal information
- Born: February 17, 1987 (age 39)
- Listed height: 6 ft 0 in (1.83 m)
- Listed weight: 215 lb (98 kg)

Career information
- High school: Apple Valley (MN)
- College: Saint John's (MN) (2006–2008); St. Thomas (MN) (2009)
- NFL draft: 2010: undrafted

Career history
- Tri-Cities Fever (2012–2014); Portland Thunder (2015); Tri-Cities Fever (2015); Spokane Empire (2016–present)

Awards and highlights
- IFL's Adam Pringle Award (2015)

Career AFL statistics
- FG Made: 59
- FG Att: 74
- PAT Made: 175
- PAT Att: 191
- Stats at ArenaFan.com

Brady Beeson (born February 17, 1987) is an American football placekicker for the Spokane Empire of the Indoor Football League (IFL).

== Early life ==
Beeson grew up playing hockey, cross-country skiing, soccer, and track and field often. He graduated from Apple Valley High School in Apple Valley, Minnesota.

== College career ==
Having never played high school football, Beeson was a walk-on at St. John's University, where he was a back-up kicker for 3 seasons under coach John Gagliardi, the winningest college football coach of all time. In 2009, Beeson transferred to the University of St. Thomas and played his final season for Glenn Caruso and the Tommies. While playing at UST, Brady Beeson set three school records – PAT's in a game (9-9), PAT's in a season (58), and points in a season as a kicker (79). It was his only season as a starting kicker.

== Professional career ==
=== Tri-Cities Fever ===
Brady joined the Tri-Cities Fever in the 2012 season, shortly before the playoffs. In his debut game, Beeson went 4-5 in field goals (52,45,22 and 24 yards), including the game winner. He went on to be the IFL Special Teams Player of the week. In his two and a half seasons with the Fever, Beeson tallied 39 field goals, 120 PAT's and 238 total points. He is the all-time leading scorer among Fever kickers (59 field goals, 165 PAT's and 342 total points).

=== Portland Thunder ===
On October 10, 2014, Beeson was assigned to the Portland Thunder of the Arena Football League (AFL).

=== Spokane Empire ===
Beeson signed with the Spokane Empire for a single game, where he 6 for 6 on his PATs. He was released the next week. On May 19, 2016, Beeson was re-signed by the Empire.

== Off the field ==
Brady Beeson is a coach with Husted Kicking, started by former NFL kicker Michael Husted. Beeson, Husted and others on staff work with high school, college and professional specialists around the country helping them improve their skills.
