= Jameel Sewell =

American football player and coach (born 1987)

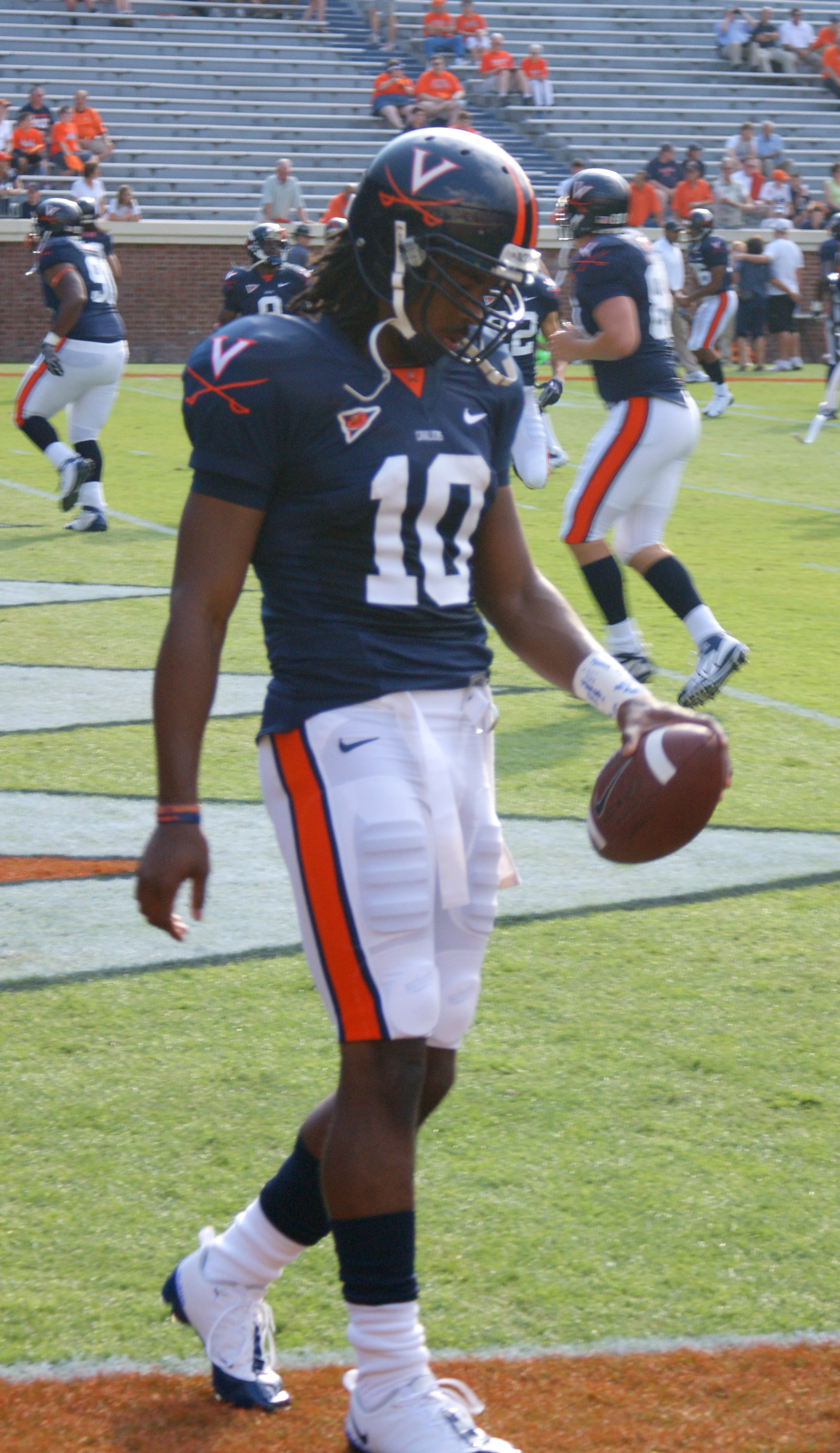

No. 10
- Position: Quarterback

Personal information
- Born: October 19, 1987 (age 39); Richmond, Virginia, U.S.
- Listed height: 6 ft 3 in (1.91 m)
- Listed weight: 220 lb (100 kg)

Career information
- High school: Richmond (VA) Hermitage
- College: Virginia (2005–2009)
- NFL draft: 2010: undrafted

Career history

Playing
- Milwaukee Mustangs (2011); Green Bay Blizzard (2011); Nebraska Danger (2012–2016)

Coaching
- Nebraska Danger (2017) Quarterbacks coach; Nebraska Danger (2019) Offensive coordinator; San Diego Strike Force (2020) Offensive coordinator

Awards and highlights
- 2× IFL MVP (2013, 2015); IFL Offensive Player of the Year (2013); 2× First-team All-IFL (2013, 2015)

Career AFL statistics
- Comp. / Att.: 2 / 6
- Passing yards: 20
- TD–INT: 0-0
- QB rating: 43.75
- Stats at ArenaFan.com

Jameel Sewell (born October 19, 1987) is an American former football quarterback. He played college football for the Virginia Cavaliers.

== Early life ==
Jameel Sewell attended Hermitage High School in Richmond. As a senior, he had 106 completions in 175 attempts for 2,001 yards and 27 touchdowns and threw six interceptions; as a junior, he completed 65 of 135 passes for 1,032 yards and 16 touchdowns. Sewell also rushed for three touchdowns and intercepted two passes from his safety position as a senior. He was named first-team All-Metro by the Richmond Times-Dispatch.

== College career ==
=== 2005–2006 seasons ===
During the 2005 college football season, Sewell redshirted as a true freshman. Entering the 2006 season, he was third on the depth chart behind redshirt senior Christian Olsen and redshirt junior Kevin McCabe. When Olsen struggled during the season opener, a loss to Pittsburgh, both McCabe and Sewell received playing time. Sewell did not play in the following game, when McCabe relieved Olsen and led the Cavaliers to a victory over Wyoming. McCabe started in the next game, against Western Michigan, but was benched in favor of Sewell after halftime. Sewell started Virginia's remaining nine games in the 2006 season, beginning with a game at Georgia Tech. The Cavaliers posted a record of 4-5 in those games to finish the season with a 5-7 record. Despite generally positive opinions of Sewell's progress by fans and the media, Virginia finished near the bottom in most offensive categories in NCAA Division I-A.

=== 2007 season ===
After the season ended, coach Al Groh said he was not ready to "anoint" Sewell as the unquestioned starter for the 2007 season. McCabe transferred to another school and the other two returning quarterbacks had not taken a game snap, but highly recruited quarterback Peter Lalich joined the Cavaliers in 2007. In the season-opening loss at Wyoming, Lalich replaced an ineffective Sewell. Lalich continued to be the quarterback in a few series for the next few games until Sewell led the Cavaliers to several narrow victories with fourth-quarter scoring drives. Lalich temporarily replaced an injured Sewell in games against N.C. State, Maryland, Virginia Tech, and Texas Tech. Virginia lost three of those four games.

=== Academic ineligibility ===
Sewell was not allowed to enroll at the University for the spring 2008 semester due to his academic standing. He decided against transferring to a Division I-AA school which would have allowed him to play in the 2008 season and announced plans to return to Virginia for the spring 2009 semester.

=== 2009 season ===
Sewell rejoined the team in January 2009 and after a bad performance by Vic Hall in the opening game, Sewell regained the starting job. After starting out 0–3, UVA went on a three-game winning streak to a 3–3 record. But then UVA lost the last six games of the season to finish 3–9. Sewell Exploded after he took the starting job passing 1,116 yards and rushing for 887 yards.

=== College statistics ===
Season	GP	Passing						Rushing			
Season	GP	Cmp	Att	Pct	Yds	TD	Int	Att	Yds	Avg	TD
2005	0	Did not play due to redshirt									
2006	11	143	247	57.9	1,342	5	6	95	200	2.1	4
2007	13	214	364	58.8	2,176	12	9	126	279	2.2	4
2008	0	Did not play due to academic ineligibility									
2009	11	157	292	53.8	1,848	7	7	136	167	1.2	7
Career	35	514	903	56.9	5,366	24	22	357	646	1.8	15

== Professional career ==
=== Milwaukee Mustangs ===
On February 28, 2011, Sewell signed with the Milwaukee Mustangs of the Arena Football League (AFL). Sewell appeared in one game with the Mustangs before his release.

=== Green Bay Blizzard ===
On March 16, 2011, Sewell signed with the Green Bay Blizzard of the Indoor Football League (IFL). He was then traded to the Nebraska Danger in October 2011.

=== Nebraska Danger ===
After playing sparingly for the Danger in 2012, Sewell took off for the Danger in 2013. Sewell threw for 2,531 yards while throwing 52 touchdowns and only 5 interceptions. His duel-threat abilities also resulted in him rushing for 654 yards and scoring 25 rushing touchdowns. After leading the Danger to a 10-4 record, the Danger advanced to United Bowl V, where the Danger fell to the Sioux Falls Storm 43-40. After the season, Sewell was named the IFL's MVP as well as the Offensive Player of the Year awards. Sewell re-signed with the Danger for the 2014 season. Sewell was third in the IFL with 38 passing touchdowns and second in rushing yards and rushing touchdowns to claim his second MVP in three years.
