= 2015 Billings Wolves season =

Indoor Football League team season

- Owner: Ron Benzel
- General manager: Marc Burr
- Head coach: Chris Dixon
- Home stadium: Rimrock Auto Arena at MetraPark; 308 6th Avenue North; Billings Montana 59101

Results
- Record: 5-9
- Conference place: 4th
- Playoffs: did not qualify

The 2015 Billings Wolves season was the team's first season as a professional indoor football franchise as an expansion team of the Indoor Football League (IFL). One of ten teams competing in the IFL for the 2015 season, the Billings, Montana-based Wolves were members of the Intense Conference.

== Schedule ==
Key: Win Tie Loss Bye

=== Regular season ===
All start times are local time

Week	Day	Date	Kickoff	Opponent	Results		Location
Week	Day	Date	Kickoff	Opponent	Score	Record	Location
1	Saturday	February 28	7:05pm	at Tri-Cities Fever	L 17-30	0-1	Toyota Center
2	BYE						
3	Sunday	March 15	3:00pm	Cedar Rapids Titans	L 38-45 (2 OT)	0-2	Rimrock Auto Arena at MetraPark
4	Saturday	March 21	7:05pm	at Bemidji Axemen	L 44-47	0-3	Sanford Center
5	Sunday	March 29	3:00pm	at Sioux Falls Storm	L 41-56	0-4	Denny Sanford PREMIER Center
6	Friday	April 3	7:15pm	Colorado Ice	L 34-69	0-5	Rimrock Auto Arena at MetraPark
7	BYE						
8	Saturday	April 18	6:00pm	at Green Bay Blizzard	W 56-37	1-5	Resch Center
9	Sunday	April 26	3:00pm	Tri-Cities Fever	L 30-58	1-6	Rimrock Auto Arena at MetraPark
10	Saturday	May 2	7:00pm	at Nebraska Danger	L 60-63 (OT)	1-7	Eihusen Arena
11	Friday	May 8	7:00pm	Iowa Barnstormers	L 17-20	1-8	Rimrock Auto Arena at MetraPark
12	Saturday	May 16	7:15pm	Bemidji Axemen	W 70-25	2-8	Rimrock Auto Arena at MetraPark
13	Saturday	May 23	7:05pm	at Tri-Cities Fever	W 48-45	3-8	Toyota Center
14	Friday	May 29	7:15pm	Tri-Cities Fever	W 61-50	4-8	Rimrock Auto Arena at MetraPark
15	Saturday	June 6	7:00pm	at Colorado Ice	L 62-67	4-9	Budweiser Events Center
16	Friday	June 12	7:15pm	Nebraska Danger	W 60-50	5-9	Rimrock Auto Arena at MetraPark
17	BYE						

== Standings ==
2015 Intense Conference
	W	L	T	PCT	PF	PA	GB	STK
y-Nebraska Danger	10	4	0	.714	739	636	--	L1
x-Tri-Cities Fever	8	6	0	.571	648	655	2.0	W1
Colorado Ice	6	8	0	.429	658	666	4.0	W3
Billings Wolves	5	9	0	.357	638	663	5.0	W1
Wichita Falls Nighthawks	4	10	0	.286	546	615	6.0	L5

== Roster ==
2015 Billings Wolves roster
Quarterbacks: 1 Darakatalib Britt; Running backs: 22 Charles Davidson; Wide receivers: 2 D. A. Allen; 9 Travis Browne; 6 Austin Coleman; 10 Reginald Lewis; 17 Demarius Washington	Offensive linemen: 54 Nick Chartain; 55 Kameron Neal; 51 Nathaniel Ryan; Defensive linemen: -- Dion DuBose; 20 Marquaveus Jackson; 52 Cory Richardson; 99 Christopher Turner	Linebackers: 42 Arthur Smith; 33 Ricardo Thompson; Defensive backs: 21 Omar Cook; 28 E. J. Frain; 26 Michael Green; 7 Travonti Johnson; 3 Norris Wrenn III; Kickers: 24 Thomas Chameraud	Injured Reserve: 44 Eric Banford DL (IR); Exempt List: currently vacant; Refused to report: currently vacant; rookies in italics Roster updated June 4, 2015; 22 Active, 1 Inactive → More rosters
