= 2015 Colorado Ice season =

Sports season

- Owner: Tom Wigley
- General manager: Collins Sanders
- Head coach: Heron O'Neal
- Home stadium: Budweiser Events Center; 5290 Arena Circle; Loveland, Colorado 80538

Results
- Record: 6–8
- Conference place: 3rd
- Playoffs: did not qualify

The 2015 Colorado Ice season was the team's ninth season as a professional indoor football franchise and seventh in the Indoor Football League (IFL). One of ten teams that competed in the IFL for the 2015 season, the Fort Collins-based Colorado Ice were members of the Intense Conference.

Founded in 2007 as part of United Indoor Football, the Colorado Ice became charter members of the IFL when the UIF merged with the Intense Football League before the 2009 season. In their third season under head coach Heron O'Neal, the team played their home games at the Budweiser Events Center in Loveland, Colorado.

The Colorado Icicles dance team was led by director Rehannon Crumb.

== Schedule ==
Key: Win Tie Loss Bye

=== Regular season ===
All start times are local time

Week	Day	Date	Kickoff	Opponent	Results		Location
Week	Day	Date	Kickoff	Opponent	Score	Record	Location
1	Sunday	March 1	3:00pm	Wichita Falls Nighthawks	W 37–13	1–0	Budweiser Events Center
2	BYE						
3	Sunday	March 15	3:00pm	Sioux Falls Storm	L 40–59	1–1	Budweiser Events Center
4	BYE						
5	Saturday	March 28	8:05pm	at Cedar Rapids Titans	L 29–39	1–2	U.S. Cellular Center
6	Friday	April 3	7:15pm	at Billings Wolves	W 69–34	2–2	Rimrock Auto Arena at MetraPark
7	Saturday	April 11	7:05pm	at Sioux Falls Storm	L 41–70	2–3	Denny Sanford PREMIER Center
8	Saturday	April 18	7:00pm	Wichita Falls Nighthawks	L 54–66	2–4	Budweiser Events Center
9	Saturday	April 25	7:00pm	at Wichita Falls Nighthawks	L 44–51	2–5	Kay Yeager Coliseum
10	Saturday	May 2	7:05pm	at Tri-Cities Fever	L 34–41	2–6	Toyota Center
11	Saturday	May 9	7:00pm	Bemidji Axemen	W 37–27	3–6	Sanford Center
12	Saturday	May 16	7:00pm	Tri-Cities Fever	L 36–52	3–7	Budweiser Events Center
13	Saturday	May 23	7:00pm	at Nebraska Danger	L 57–67	3–8	Eihusen Arena
14	Friday	May 29	7:30pm	Nebraska Danger	W 53–36	4–8	Budweiser Events Center
15	Saturday	June 6	7:00pm	Billings Wolves	W 67–62	5–8	Budweiser Events Center
16	Saturday	June 13	7:00pm	at Wichita Falls Nighthawks	W 60–50	6–8	Kay Yeager Coliseum
17	BYE						

== Standings ==
2015 Intense Conference
	W	L	T	PCT	PF	PA	GB	STK
y-Nebraska Danger	10	4	0	.714	739	636	--	L1
x-Tri-Cities Fever	8	6	0	.571	648	655	2.0	W1
Colorado Ice	6	8	0	.429	658	666	4.0	W3
Billings Wolves	5	9	0	.357	638	663	5.0	W1
Wichita Falls Nighthawks	4	10	0	.286	546	615	6.0	L5

== Roster ==
2015 Colorado Ice roster
Quarterbacks: 2 Matt Behrendt; 10 Jake Johnson; 9 Brandon Mitchell; Running backs: 21 Rodney Scott; Wide receivers: 7 Marcus Jackson; 8 Kyle Kaiser; 88 Quintin Payton; 12 Roy Roundtree; 22 Rashard Smith	Offensive linemen: 58 Marcus Cuellar; 78 Walter Stuller; 92 Meili Valele; Defensive linemen: 97 Jesse Dickson; 99 J. D. Griggs; 54 Jason Jones; 95 Avalisi Lapuahu; -- Tim McGill; -- Alec Petrocelli; 55 Bill Vavau	Linebackers: 4 Stephen Franklin; Defensive backs: 3 Justin Blake; 10 Louis Covington; 1 Darnell Evans; 24 Carl Miles Jr.; 28 Quinton Richardson; 20 Corey Sample; Kickers: 19 Christopher Diaz	Injured reserve: 75 Jacolby Ashworth OL; 33 Timote Fotu LB; 99 Curtis Porter DL; 10 Chris Slaughter WR; Exempt list: 21 Danny Mason LB; Refused to report: 66 Eric Pike OL; Rookies in italics Roster updated June 4, 2015; 27 Active, 6 Inactive → More rosters
