= 2015 Wichita Falls Nighthawks season =

Indoor Football League team season

- Owner: Drew Carnes
- Head coach: James Kerwin
- Home stadium: Kay Yeager Coliseum; 1000 5th Street; Wichita Falls, Texas 76301

Results
- Record: 4-10
- Conference place: 5th
- Playoffs: did not qualify

The 2015 Wichita Falls Nighthawks season was the team's first season as a professional indoor football franchise as an expansion team of the Indoor Football League (IFL). One of ten teams competing in the IFL for the 2015 season, the Wichita Falls, Texas-based Nighthawks are members of the Intense Conference.

== Schedule ==
Key: Win Tie Loss Bye

=== Regular season ===
All start times are local time

Week	Day	Date	Kickoff	Opponent	Results		Location
Week	Day	Date	Kickoff	Opponent	Score	Record	Location
1	Sunday	March 1	3:00pm	at Colorado Ice	L 13-37	0-1	Budweiser Events Center
2	Saturday	March 7	7:00pm	at Nebraska Danger	L 30-45	0-2	Eihusen Arena
3	Saturday	March 14	7:00pm	Nebraska Danger	L 26-36	0-3	Kay Yeager Coliseum
4	BYE						
5	Saturday	March 28	7:00pm	Tri-Cities Fever	L 48-58	0-4	Kay Yeager Coliseum
6	Saturday	April 4	7:00pm	Bemidji Axemen	W 58-27	1-4	Kay Yeager Coliseum
7	BYE						
8	Saturday	April 18	7:00pm	at Colorado Ice	W 66-54	2-4	Budweiser Events Center
9	Saturday	April 25	7:00pm	Colorado Ice	W 51-44	3-4	Kay Yeager Coliseum
10	Saturday	May 2	7:00pm	Cedar Rapids Titans	L 40-63	3-5	Kay Yeager Coliseum
11	Saturday	May 9	8:05pm	at Cedar Rapids Titans	W 38-34	4-5	U.S. Cellular Center
12	Saturday	May 16	6:00pm	at Green Bay Blizzard	L 36-37	4-6	Resch Center
13	Saturday	May 23	7:00pm	Green Bay Blizzard	L 31-41	4-7	Kay Yeager Coliseum
14	Saturday	May 30	7:05pm	at Iowa Barnstormers	L 25-29	4-8	Wells Fargo Arena
15	Saturday	June 6	7:00pm	at Nebraska Danger	L 34-50	4-9	Eihusen Arena
16	Saturday	June 13	7:00pm	Colorado Ice	L 50-60	4-10	Kay Yeager Coliseum
17	BYE						

== Roster ==
2015 Wichita Falls Nighthawks roster
Quarterbacks: 8 Marcus Jackson; Running backs: 18 Preston Brown; Wide receivers: 1 Jerome McGee; 88 Jimmy Pipkin; 44 Jo-Jo Sawyer	Offensive linemen: 78 Larry Banks; 69 Clint Marsh; -- Zion Pyatt; -- Shadow Stokes; Defensive linemen: -- Mack Lafeale; 95 Terrance Lloyd; 99 Rickey Simpson; 97 Tino Tuilata	Linebackers: 47 Solomon Randle; Defensive backs: 24 James Ackel; 38 Neiko Conway; 21 Danny Jackson; 23 Jestin Love; 33 Deanté Purvis; 5 DeMarkus Washington; 17 Mark Watley; Kickers: 40 Ali Mourtada	Injury Reserve: 55 Billy Harrison DL (IR); 28 Ed Wesley RB (IR); 89 Lenard Williams DL (IR); Transfer: -- Josh Francis LB (Exempt); Refused to Report: -- Donovan Bonner LB (DNR); 12 J. J. Hayes WR (DNR); 23 Elisha Olabode DB (DNR); -- Rolandis Woodland WR (DNR); rookies in italics Roster updated June 4, 2015; 22 Active, 8 Inactive → More rosters

== Standings ==
2015 Intense Conference
	W	L	T	PCT	PF	PA	GB	STK
y-Nebraska Danger	10	4	0	.714	739	636	--	L1
x-Tri-Cities Fever	8	6	0	.571	648	655	2.0	W1
Colorado Ice	6	8	0	.429	658	666	4.0	W3
Billings Wolves	5	9	0	.357	638	663	5.0	W1
Wichita Falls Nighthawks	4	10	0	.286	546	615	6.0	L5
