= ImOn Ice Arena =

Multipurpose arena in Cedar Rapids, Iowa, United States

Coordinates: 41.965830°N 91.688559°W

- Interactive map of ImOn Ice Arena
- Address: 1100 Rockford Road Southwest
- Location: Cedar Rapids, Iowa
- Owner: City of Cedar Rapids
- Operator: VenuWorks
- Capacity: 3,850

Construction
- Groundbreaking: June 1999
- Opened: January 8, 2000
- Cost: $6.7 million ($12.5 million in 2025 dollars)
- Architects: Hammel, Green and Abrahamson, Inc.
- General contractors: Point Builders, LLC.

Tenants
- Cedar Rapids RoughRiders (USHL) 2000–present Cedar Rapids Titans (IFL) 2012–2013; Iowa Hawkeyes Club Hockey (ACHA) (previously)

The ImOn Ice Arena is a 3,850-seat multipurpose arena in Cedar Rapids, Iowa, located adjacent to Veterans Memorial Stadium. The arena opened on January 8, 2000, and is owned by the city of Cedar Rapids. It is home to the Cedar Rapids RoughRiders of the United States Hockey League as well as several local youth hockey teams. The University of Iowa Hawkeyes club hockey team plays some of their home games at the facility. The arena contains separate sheets of ice for ice hockey games and for public and figure ice skating. ImOn Communications purchased naming rights to the arena from the city in 2020, with the current naming agreement running through 2030.

The arena serves as the home ice for the Eastern Iowa Figure Skating Club, a US Figure Skating club.

For the 2012 and 2013 seasons, it was the temporary home to the Cedar Rapids Titans indoor football team as the U.S. Cellular Center, where they started playing in 2014 and beyond, was being renovated.

The arena contains two sheets of ice. One sheet is Olympic regulation (200 by 100 feet (61 by 30 m)), and the other is NHL regulation (200 by 85 feet (61 by 26 m)). Public skating, youth hockey, and figure skating events take place on both sheets of ice, whereas larger events, such as RoughRider games, are held on the NHL sheet of ice.

The arena was severely damaged by a derecho storm which hit Cedar Rapids on August 10, 2020. The RoughRiders hockey team announced on September 18, 2020, that they would not participate in the 2020-2021 USHL season, because of the damage to the arena. Repair costs, initially estimated at $4 million, were reported in January 2021 to have risen to "the $6-million range."
