= 2011 United Bowl =

U.S. College football game

Tri-Cities Fever	Sioux Falls Storm
(13–4)	(15–1)
Intense	United
10	37
Head coach: Adam Shackleford	Head coach: Kurtiss Riggs
	1	2	3	4	Total
Tri-Cities	3	7	0	0	10
Sioux Falls	10	7	14	6	37
- Date: July 16, 2011
- Stadium: Sioux Falls Arena
- Location: Sioux Falls, South Dakota, U.S.
- MVP: Sioux Falls QB Chris Dixon
- Referee: Craig Helser
- Attendance: 4,696

The 2011 United Bowl was the third title game of the Indoor Football League (IFL). It was played on July 16, 2011, at the Sioux Falls Arena in Sioux Falls, South Dakota. The top seed in the United Conference, the Sioux Falls Storm, defeated the fourth-seed Intense Conference champion Tri-Cities Fever, by a score of 37–10.

== Road to the United Bowl ==
=== United Conference ===
2011 Great Plains Division
	W	L	T	PCT	PF	PA	DIV	GB	STK
z Sioux Falls Storm	13	1	0	0.929	1022	457	5–1	—	L1
x Omaha Beef	9	5	0	0.643	615	523	5–1	4.0	W1
Wichita Wild	6	8	0	0.429	571	618	1–5	7.0	W2
Nebraska Danger	3	11	0	0.214	617	788	1–5	10.0	L8

2011 Great Lakes Division
	W	L	T	PCT	PF	PA	DIV	GB	STK
y Green Bay Blizzard	11	3	0	0.786	764	508	4–2	—	W4
x Bloomington Extreme	9	5	0	0.643	561	473	4–2	2.0	L1
x Chicago Slaughter	8	6	0	0.571	624	627	4–2	3.0	L3
La Crosse Spartans	5	9	0	0.357	495	633	0–6	6.0	W1

2011 Atlantic Division
	W	L	T	PCT	PF	PA	DIV	GB	STK
y Reading Express	8	6	0	0.571	525	516	7–1	—	L1
Lehigh Valley Steelhawks	4	10	0	0.286	432	595	3–5	4.0	L2
Richmond Revolution	3	11	0	0.214	441	593	2–6	5.0	W1

=== Intense Conference ===
2011 Pacific Division
	W	L	T	PCT	PF	PA	DIV	GB	STK
y Fairbanks Grizzlies	10	4	0	0.714	723	545	6–3	—	W2
x Tri-Cities Fever	10	4	0	0.714	816	575	6–3	—	W2
Seattle Timberwolves	5	9	0	0.357	678	796	4–5	5.0	L2
Wenatchee Valley Venom	3	11	0	0.214	508	845	2–7	7.0	L4

2011 Mountain West Division
	W	L	T	PCT	PF	PA	DIV	GB	STK
z Colorado Ice	11	3	0	0.786	671	492	5–1	—	W1
x Wyoming Cavalry	9	6	0	0.643	677	582	4–2	2.0	L1
Arizona Adrenaline	1	13	0	0.071	326	908	0–6	10.0	L2

2011 Lonestar Division
	W	L	T	PCT	PF	PA	DIV	GB	STK
y Allen Wranglers	10	4	0	0.714	664	510	7–2	—	W2
x West Texas Roughnecks	10	4	0	0.714	656	391	6–3	—	W3
Amarillo Venom	4	10	0	0.286	529	522	3–6	6.0	L1
Bricktown Brawlers (Note: Last four games were losses played by replacements teams.)	2	12	0	0.143	292	717	2–7	8.0	L10

y - clinched division title

x - clinched playoff spot

Kennewick, WA	Loveland, CO
5	West Texas	49
4	Tri-Cities	45
4	Tri-Cities	61	Allen, TX
1	Colorado	42
Intense Conference
Allen, TX	4	Tri-Cities	67
Fairbanks, AK
3	Allen	46
6	Wyoming	20	Intense Conference Championship
3	Allen	72
3	Allen	27	Sioux Falls, SD
2	Fairbanks	54
Wild Card Round
Reading, PA	I4	Tri-Cities	10
Ashwaubenon, WI
U1	Sioux Falls	37
6	Chicago	33	2011 United Bowl
3	Reading	51
3	Reading	76	Sioux Falls, SD
2	Green Bay	68
United Conference
Omaha, NE	2	Green Bay	12
Sioux Falls, SD
1	Sioux Falls	52
5	Bloomington	34	United Conference Championship
4	Omaha	39
4	Omaha	39
1	Sioux Falls	52
