= 2011 Indoor Football League season =

2011 IFL season
- League: Indoor Football League
- Sport: Indoor Football
- Duration: February 19, 2011 – July 16, 2011
- Teams: 22

Regular season
- Season champions: Sioux Falls Storm
- Season MVP: Chris Dixon

Playoffs
- Intense champions: Tri-Cities Fever
- Intense runners-up: Allen Wranglers
- United champions: Sioux Falls Storm
- United runners-up: Green Bay Blizzard

2011 United Bowl Championship
- Champions: Sioux Falls Storm
- Runners-up: Tri-Cities Fever
- Finals MVP: Chris Dixon

IFL seasons
- ← 2010 2012 →

The 2011 Indoor Football League season was the third season of the Indoor Football League (IFL). The regular season began on Saturday, February 19, 2011, with the Kickoff Classic game, and ended on Sunday, June 12, 2011. After three weeks of playoffs, and one week off, the playoffs ended with the 2011 United Bowl on July 16 where the Sioux Falls Storm defeated the Tri-Cities Fever 37-10.

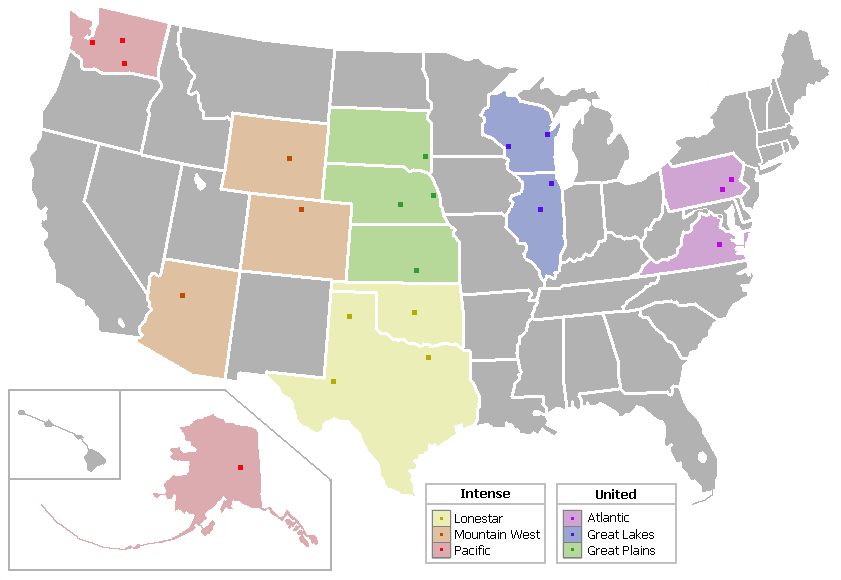

== Final regular season standings ==
=== United Conference ===
2011 Great Plains Division
	W	L	T	PCT	PF	PA	DIV	GB	STK
z Sioux Falls Storm	13	1	0	0.929	1022	457	5–1	—	L1
x Omaha Beef	9	5	0	0.643	615	523	5–1	4.0	W1
Wichita Wild	6	8	0	0.429	571	618	1–5	7.0	W2
Nebraska Danger	3	11	0	0.214	617	788	1–5	10.0	L8

2011 Great Lakes Division
	W	L	T	PCT	PF	PA	DIV	GB	STK
y Green Bay Blizzard	11	3	0	0.786	764	508	4–2	—	W4
x Bloomington Extreme	9	5	0	0.643	561	473	4–2	2.0	L1
x Chicago Slaughter	8	6	0	0.571	624	627	4–2	3.0	L3
La Crosse Spartans	5	9	0	0.357	495	633	0–6	6.0	W1

2011 Atlantic Division
	W	L	T	PCT	PF	PA	DIV	GB	STK
y Reading Express	8	6	0	0.571	525	516	7–1	—	L1
Lehigh Valley Steelhawks	4	10	0	0.286	432	595	3–5	4.0	L2
Richmond Revolution	3	11	0	0.214	441	593	2–6	5.0	W1

=== Intense Conference ===
2011 Pacific Division
	W	L	T	PCT	PF	PA	DIV	GB	STK
y Fairbanks Grizzlies	10	4	0	0.714	723	545	6–3	—	W2
x Tri-Cities Fever	10	4	0	0.714	816	575	6–3	—	W2
Seattle Timberwolves	5	9	0	0.357	678	796	4–5	5.0	L2
Wenatchee Valley Venom	3	11	0	0.214	508	845	2–7	7.0	L4

2011 Mountain West Division
	W	L	T	PCT	PF	PA	DIV	GB	STK
z Colorado Ice	11	3	0	0.786	671	492	5–1	—	W1
x Wyoming Cavalry	9	6	0	0.643	677	582	4–2	2.0	L1
Arizona Adrenaline	1	13	0	0.071	326	908	0–6	10.0	L2

2011 Lonestar Division
	W	L	T	PCT	PF	PA	DIV	GB	STK
y Allen Wranglers	10	4	0	0.714	664	510	7–2	—	W2
x West Texas Roughnecks	10	4	0	0.714	656	391	6–3	—	W3
Amarillo Venom	4	10	0	0.286	529	522	3–6	6.0	L1
Bricktown Brawlers (Note: Last four games were losses played by replacements teams.)	2	12	0	0.143	292	717	2–7	8.0	L10

z - clinched conference title

y - clinched division title

x - clinched playoff spot

== Playoffs ==
Kennewick, WA	Loveland, CO
5	West Texas	49
4	Tri-Cities	45
4	Tri-Cities	61	Allen, TX
1	Colorado	42
Intense Conference
Allen, TX	4	Tri-Cities	67
Fairbanks, AK
3	Allen	46
6	Wyoming	20	Intense Conference Championship
3	Allen	72
3	Allen	27	Sioux Falls, SD
2	Fairbanks	54
Wild Card Round
Reading, PA	I4	Tri-Cities	10
Ashwaubenon, WI
U1	Sioux Falls	37
6	Chicago	33	2011 United Bowl
3	Reading	51
3	Reading	76	Sioux Falls, SD
2	Green Bay	68
United Conference
Omaha, NE	2	Green Bay	12
Sioux Falls, SD
1	Sioux Falls	52
5	Bloomington	34	United Conference Championship
4	Omaha	39
4	Omaha	39
1	Sioux Falls	52

== Awards ==
=== Individual season awards ===
Award	Winner	Position	Team
Most Valuable Player	Chris Dixon	Quarterback	Sioux Falls Storm
Offensive Player of the Year	Chris Dixon	Quarterback	Sioux Falls Storm
Co-Defensive Player of the Year	Antonio Ficklin	Defensive lineman	Bloomington Extreme
Special Teams Player of the Year	B. J. Hill	Kick returner	Green Bay Blizzard
Offensive Rookie of the Year	Romandre Gibbs	Running back	Fairbanks Grizzlies
Defensive Rookie of the Year	Arkeith Brown	Defensive back	Green Bay Blizzard
Most Improved Player	David Knighton	Quarterback	Colorado Ice
Adam Pringle Award	Robert Fuller	Head coach	Fairbanks Grizzlies
Coach of the Year	Robert Fuller	Head coach	Fairbanks Grizzlies
