= 2011 Sioux Falls Storm season =

Indoor Football League team season

- Owner: Todd Tryon
- Head coach: Kurtiss Riggs
- Home stadium: Sioux Falls Arena

Results
- Record: 13–1
- Division place: 1st Great Plains
- Playoffs: Won UC Semifinals (Beef) 52-39; Won UC Championship (Blizzard) 52-12; Won 2011 United Bowl (Fever) 37-10

The 2011 Sioux Falls Storm season was the team's twelfth season as a professional indoor football franchise and third in the Indoor Football League (IFL). One of twenty-two teams competing in the IFL for the 2011 season, the Storm were members of the Great Plains Division of the United Conference.

Led by head coach Kurtiss Riggs, the Storm played their home games at the Sioux Falls Arena in Sioux Falls, South Dakota. Sioux Falls entered the 2011 season following a loss in the league's United Bowl championship game in 2010.

After a tornado dubbed the Father's Day Tornado hit Billings' Rimrock Auto Arena on June 20, 2010, causing major damage, the Outlaws franchise folded, and their star quarterback Chris Dixon signed with the Storm. Led by Dixon, Sioux Falls scored an astounding 1022 points on the 2011 regular season, with 70 or more points in 10 games and opening with a 105-71 win over the Kent Predators in Kent, Washington. Only twice did the Storm fall short of 50 points and both were against the Omaha Beef, who handed them a 41-37 loss in the regular season finale after Sioux Falls had started 13-0. The two teams met in the next game, which was the playoff opener. The Storm won it, 52-39, then beat Green Bay 52-12 to return to the United Bowl. Although they tied their lowest scoring game of the season, Sioux Falls rolled over the Tri-Cities Fever 37-10 to earn the league championship after a two-year hiatus and also win its first IFL title.

== Schedule ==
Key: Win Tie Loss Bye

=== Regular season ===
All start times are local time

Week	Day	Date	Kickoff	Opponent	Results		Location
Week	Day	Date	Kickoff	Opponent	Score	Record	Location
1	Friday	February 25	7:05pm	at Kent Predators	W 105-71	1-0	ShoWare Center
2	BYE						
3	Monday	March 14	7:05pm	Wenatchee Valley Venom	W 80-19	2-0	Sioux Falls Arena
4	Monday	March 21	7:05pm	Nebraska Danger	W 80-32	3-0	Sioux Falls Arena
5	Saturday	March 26	7:05pm	at Wichita Wild	W 92-20	4-0	Hartman Arena
6	Sunday	April 3	2:05pm	Omaha Beef	W 48-38	5-0	Sioux Falls Arena
7	BYE						
8	Friday	April 15	7:05pm	La Crosse Spartans	W 77-10	6-0	Sioux Falls Arena
9	Saturday	April 23	7:05pm	at Bricktown Brawlers	W 84-30	7-0	Cox Convention Center
10	Saturday	April 30	8:05pm	at Nebraska Danger	W 78-56	8-0	Eihusen Arena
11	Saturday	May 7	7:05pm	Bloomington Extreme	W 60-28	9-0	Sioux Falls Arena
12	Sunday	May 15	2:05pm	Green Bay Blizzard	W 57-38	10-0	Sioux Falls Arena
13	Friday	May 20	7:05pm	at Wyoming Cavalry	W 70-30	11-0	Casper Events Center
14	Saturday	May 28	7:05pm	Wichita Wild	W 78-16	12-0	Sioux Falls Arena
15	Saturday	June 4	7:11pm	at Chicago Slaughter	W 76-28	13-0	Sears Centre
16	Saturday	June 11	7:05pm	at Omaha Beef	L 37-41	13-1	Omaha Civic Auditorium

=== Post-season ===
Round	Day	Date	Kickoff	Opponent	Results		Location
Round	Day	Date	Kickoff	Opponent	Final score	Record	Location
United Conference Semifinal	Saturday	June 25	7:05pm	Omaha Beef	W 52-39	1-0	Sioux Falls Arena
United Conference Championship	Saturday	July 9	7:15pm	Green Bay Blizzard	W 52-12	2-0	Sioux Falls Arena
United Bowl	Saturday	July 16	7:15pm	Tri-Cities Fever	W 37-10	3-0	Sioux Falls Arena

== Roster ==
2011 Sioux Falls Storm roster
Quarterbacks: 2 Chris Dixon; Running backs: 8 James Jones; 22 Lorne Sam; Wide receivers: 84 Dusty Hovorka; 18 Carl Sims; 9 James Terry	Offensive linemen: 71 Gerald Davis; 55 Charlie Sanders; 75 Myniya Smith; Defensive linemen: 15 Michael Bazemore; 12 Tommy Chavis; 52 Rachman Crable; 96 Cory Johnson; 94 Michael Landry	Linebackers: 26 Tyler Knight; 41 Brian McIntire; Defensive backs: 2 Stewart Franks; 24 Jovan Jackson; 20 Donta Moore; 3 Reggie Sullivan; 4 Kadafi Tunsil; Kickers: 11 Parker Douglass	Injured reserve: 25 Hershel Dennis RB (IR); Exempt list: Currently vacant; Practice squad: Currently vacant; Rookies in italics Roster updated July 16, 2011; 23 Active, 1 Inactive, 0 PS → More rosters

== Standings ==
2011 Great Plains Division
	W	L	T	PCT	PF	PA	DIV	GB	STK
z Sioux Falls Storm	13	1	0	0.929	1022	457	5–1	—	L1
x Omaha Beef	9	5	0	0.643	615	523	5–1	4.0	W1
Wichita Wild	6	8	0	0.429	571	618	1–5	7.0	W2
Nebraska Danger	3	11	0	0.214	617	788	1–5	10.0	L8
