= 2011 Omaha Beef season =

Indoor Football League team season

- Owner: Jeff Sprowls
- General manager: Josh Roehr
- Head coach: Bruce Cowdrey
- Home stadium: Omaha Civic Auditorium; 1804 Capitol Avenue; Omaha, NE 68102

Results
- Record: 9-5
- Division place: 2nd Great Plains
- Playoffs: Won United Conference Wild Card 39-34 (Extreme); Lost United Conference Semi-Finals 39-52 (Storm)

The 2011 Omaha Beef season was the twelfth season as a professional indoor football franchise and third in the Indoor Football League (IFL). One of twenty-two teams competing in the IFL for the 2011 season, the Omaha, Nebraska-based Omaha Beef were members of the Great Lakes Division of the United Conference.

== Schedule ==
Key: Win Tie Loss Bye

=== Preseason ===
Week	Date	Kickoff	Opponent	Results	
Week	Date	Kickoff	Opponent	Final Score	Team Record
	February 20 (Sun)	2:00pm	Saint Charles Cyclones	W 66-0	---

=== Regular season ===
Week	Date	Kickoff	Opponent	Results	
Week	Date	Kickoff	Opponent	Final Score	Team Record
1	February 26 (Sat)	7:05pm	at Chicago Slaughter	W 39-36	1-0
2	Bye				
3	March 12 (Sat)	7:05pm	La Crosse Spartans	W 40-20	2-0
4	Bye				
5	March 25 (Fri)	7:05pm	Tri-Cities Fever	L 37-51	2-1
6	April 3 (Sun)	2:05pm	at Sioux Falls Storm	L 38-48	2-2
7	April 9 (Sat)	7:05pm	Wichita Wild	W 36-24	3-2
8	April 16 (Sat)	7:11pm	at West Texas Roughnecks	L 16-39	3-3
9	April 23 (Sat)	7:05pm	Nebraska Danger	W 46-37	4-3
10	April 30 (Sat)	7:05pm	Wyoming Cavalry	W 68-24	5-3
11	May 6 (Fri)	7:05pm (9:05 Central)	at Seattle Timberwolves	L 50-52	5-4
12	May 14 (Sat)	7:05pm	at Wichita Wild	W 48-44	6-4
13	May 21 (Sat)	7:05pm	Chicago Slaughter	W 48-29	7-4
14	May 28 (Sat)	7:05pm	at Nebraska Danger	W 75-41	8-4
15	June 3 (Fri)	7:05pm (8:05 Central)	at Wyoming Cavalry	L 33-41	8-5
16	June 11 (Sat)	7:05pm	Sioux Falls Storm	W 41-37	9-5

=== Playoffs ===
Round	Date	Kickoff	Opponent	Results	
Round	Date	Kickoff	Opponent	Final Score	Team Record
Wild Card	June 18 (Sat)	7:00pm	Bloomington Extreme	W 39-34	1-0
UC Semi-Finals	June 25 (Sat)	7:05pm	at Sioux Falls Storm	L 39-52	1-1

== Roster ==
2011 Omaha Beef roster
Quarterbacks: 3 James McNear; 15 Chad Schmigel; Running backs: 20 R. J. Rollins; Wide receivers: 1 Maurice Avery; 6 Allen Burrell; 4 Mike Jones; 5 O. J. Simpson	Offensive linemen: 65 George Batiste; 54 Ya'Tarrie Brown; 72 Cournelius Lewis; 68 Dan Potmesil; Defensive linemen: 93 Michael Cross; 92 Jervonte Jackson; 99 Devonte Peterson	Linebackers: 22 Eric Bingham; 19 Matt Hewitt; 18 Kelly Rouse; Defensive backs: 13 Cornelius Brown; 24 Diezeas Calbert; 2 Cortney Grixby; 7 Travonti Johnson; 10 Michael Phillips; Kickers: 84 Brandon Stewart	Injured Reserve: currently vacant; Exempt List: currently vacant; Practice squad: currently vacant; Roster updated June 25, 2011; 23 Active, 0 Inactive, 0 PS → More rosters

== Standings ==
2011 Great Plains Division
	W	L	T	PCT	PF	PA	DIV	GB	STK
z Sioux Falls Storm	13	1	0	0.929	1022	457	5–1	—	L1
x Omaha Beef	9	5	0	0.643	615	523	5–1	4.0	W1
Wichita Wild	6	8	0	0.429	571	618	1–5	7.0	W2
Nebraska Danger	3	11	0	0.214	617	788	1–5	10.0	L8
