= Dennis Havrilla =

American football player (born 1987)

No. 12
- Position: Quarterback

Personal information
- Born: August 24, 1987 (age 39)
- Listed height: 6 ft 1 in (1.85 m)
- Listed weight: 195 lb (88 kg)

Career information
- High school: Mount Diablo (Concord, California)
- College: Western New Mexico
- NFL draft: 2010: undrafted

Career history
- Arizona Adrenaline (2011); Bricktown Brawlers (2011); Lehigh Valley Steelhawks (2012)*; Arizona Outlaws (2012); Dodge City Law (2014); Spokane Shock (2014)*; San Jose SaberCats (2014); Las Vegas Outlaws (2015); Cleveland Gladiators (2016); High Country Grizzlies (2017); Atlantic City Blackjacks (2019)
- * Offseason or practice squad member only

Career AFL statistics
- Comp. / Att.: 119 / 214
- Passing yards: 1,474
- TD–INT: 28–11
- QB rating: 88.42
- Rushing TDs: 7
- Stats at ArenaFan.com

Dennis Havrilla (born August 24, 1987) is an American former professional football quarterback. He signed as an undrafted free agent with the Arizona Adrenaline of the Indoor Football League (IFL) in 2011. He played college football at Diablo Valley College, the University of Nebraska at Kearney, and Western New Mexico University.

== Early life ==
Havrilla played high school football at Mount Diablo High School in Concord, California.

== College career ==
Havrilla first enrolled at Diablo Valley College. He later transferred to the University of Nebraska at Kearney In January 2007. He started all ten games for the Nebraska–Kearney Lopers during the 2007 season, passing for 1,928 yards and 19 touchdowns while also rushing for 247 yards and four touchdowns. He was dismissed from the team in December 2007 for violating team rules. Havrilla finished his college career at Western New Mexico University. He redshirted for the Western New Mexico Mustangs in 2008. As a senior in 2009, he passed for 1,581 yards and 13 touchdowns while also rushing 88 times for 433 yards and scored six touchdowns.

== Professional career ==
Havrilla spent multiple years in the Indoor Football League (IFL), catching on with several teams while playing quarterback, safety and placekicker. In 2014, he began the season with the Dodge City Law before signing with the Arena Football League's Spokane Shock. After three weeks on the Shock's practice squad, Havrilla returned to the Law. Not long after his return to the Law, he was assigned to the San Jose SaberCats, where he appeared as a backup to Nathan Stanley. He was reassigned by the SaberCats on July 10, 2014.

On June 19, 2015, Havrilla was assigned to the Las Vegas Outlaws. He was the backup to J. J. Raterink, but when Raterink was pulled due to his ineffective play, Havrilla was thrust into the game. The following week against the Portland Thunder, Havrilla was named the starting quarterback. He led the Outlaws to a 48-46 victory, where he scored the game-winning touchdown on a one-yard rush. On August 3, 2015, Havrilla was placed on reassignment, one week before the season ended.

On February 5, 2016, Havrilla was assigned to the Cleveland Gladiators. After Chris Dieker was injured in Week 1 of the 2016 season, Havrilla became the starting quarterback. However, he also later suffered an injury and Arvell Nelson replaced him as the starter.

On June 1, 2017, Havrilla signed with the High Country Grizzlies. He played in one game for the Grizzlies, completing 16 of 37 passes for 282 yards, 5 touchdowns and 3 interceptions.

=== AFL statistics ===
Year	Team	Passing							Rushing		
Year	Team	Cmp	Att	Pct	Yds	TD	Int	Rtg	Att	Yds	TD
2014	San Jose	5	8	62.5	105	2	0	145.83	1	0	0
2015	Las Vegas	53	101	52.5	722	14	6	85.50	13	73	4
2016	Cleveland	52	89	58.4	535	11	4	87.99	7	36	3
2019	Atlantic City	9	16	56.2	112	1	1	67.71	3	4	0
Career		119	214	55.6	1,474	28	11	88.42	24	113	7

== Personal life ==
After his football career, Havrilla opened Havrilla Commercial Investment Group.
