= 2011 Colorado Ice season =

Indoor Football League team season

- Owner: Tom Wigley
- Head coach: Collins Sanders
- Home stadium: Budweiser Events Center

Results
- Record: 11–3
- Division place: 1st, Mountain West
- Playoffs: Lost in first round

The 2011 Colorado Ice season was the team's fifth season as a football franchise and third in the Indoor Football League (IFL). Founded for the 2007 season as part of United Indoor Football, the Colorado Ice became charter members of the IFL when the UIF merged with the Intense Football League before the 2009 season. One of 22 teams that competed in the IFL for the 2011 season, the Fort Collins-based Colorado Ice were members of the Mountain West Division of the Intense Conference.

In their final season under original head coach Collins Sanders, the Colorado Ice played their home games at the Budweiser Events Center in Loveland, Colorado. The team recorded an 11–3 record, won the Mountain West Division title, and reached the playoffs.

== Schedule ==
Key: Win Tie Loss Bye

=== Preseason ===
Week	Day	Date	Kickoff	Opponent	Results		Location
Week	Day	Date	Kickoff	Opponent	Final score	Record	Location
1	Thursday	February 17	7:00pm	Colorado Cobras	W 72–6	1–0	Budweiser Events Center

=== Regular season ===
Week	Day	Date	Kickoff	Opponent	Results		Location
Week	Day	Date	Kickoff	Opponent	Final score	Record	Location
1	Friday	February 25	7:00pm	Amarillo Venom	W 37–26	1–0	Budweiser Events Center
2	Sunday	March 6	3:00pm	Wyoming Cavalry	W 39–30	2–0	Budweiser Events Center
3	Sunday	March 13	4:05pm	at Arizona Adrenaline	W 35–25	3–0	Tim's Toyota Center
4	Saturday	March 19	7:05pm	Wenatchee Valley Venom	W 52–24	4–0	Budweiser Events Center
5	BYE						
6	Sunday	April 3	4:00pm	at Bricktown Brawlers	W 38–26	5–0	Cox Convention Center
7	Saturday	April 9	7:05pm	at Amarillo Venom	W 27–24	6–0	Amarillo Civic Center
8	Sunday	April 17	3:00pm	Wyoming Cavalry	W 59–54	7–0	Budweiser Events Center
9	Saturday	April 23	7:05pm	at Tri-Cities Fever	L 42–48	7–1	Toyota Center
10	Sunday	May 1	3:00pm	Arizona Adrenaline	W 74–13	8–1	Budweiser Events Center
11	BYE						
12	Saturday	May 14	7:05pm	at Nebraska Danger	W 47–24	9–1	Eihusen Arena
13	Friday	May 20	7:00pm	Tri-Cities Fever	W 58–54	10–1	Budweiser Events Center
14	Friday	May 27	7:05pm	at Wyoming Cavalry	L 59–53	10–2	Casper Events Center
15	Saturday	June 4	7:05pm	Allen Wranglers	L 37–57	10–3	Budweiser Events Center
16	Friday	June 10	7:10pm	at Arizona Adrenaline	W 73–12	11–3	Tim's Toyota Center

=== Postseason ===
Week	Day	Date	Kickoff	Opponent	Results		Location
Week	Day	Date	Kickoff	Opponent	Final score	Record	Location
1	Monday	June 27	7:00pm	Tri-Cities Fever	L 42–45	0–1	Budweiser Events Center

== Standings ==
2011 Mountain West Division
	W	L	T	PCT	PF	PA	DIV	GB	STK
z Colorado Ice	11	3	0	0.786	671	492	5–1	—	W1
x Wyoming Cavalry	9	6	0	0.643	677	582	4–2	2.0	L1
Arizona Adrenaline	1	13	0	0.071	326	908	0–6	10.0	L2

== Awards and honors ==
On March 23, the Indoor Football League named running back Terry Washington as its offensive player of the week. The league cited his four-touchdown effort in the team's win over the Wenatchee Valley Venom in making the award.

On April 6, the Indoor Football League named defensive back Tyrone King its defensive player of the week. The league cited his "clutch performance" in Colorado's victory over the Bricktown Brawlers.
