= 2011 Green Bay Blizzard season =

Indoor Football League team season

- Owner: Titletown Football Group, LLC
- Head coach: Rik Richards
- Home stadium: Resch Center; 1901 South Oneida Street; Green Bay, WI 54304

Results
- Record: 11-3
- Division place: 1st Great Lakes
- Playoffs: Won Conference Semi-Finals (Express) 68-51; Lost United Conference Championship (Storm) 12-52

The 2011 Green Bay Blizzard season was the team's ninth season as a football franchise and second in the Indoor Football League. One of twenty-two teams competing in the IFL for the 2011 season, the Blizzard were members of the Great Lakes Division of the United Conference. The team played their home games at the Resch Center in the Green Bay suburb of Ashwaubenon, Wisconsin.

== Preseason ==
=== Schedule ===
Week	Date	Kickoff	Opponent	Results	
Week	Date	Kickoff	Opponent	Final Score	Team record
Preseason	February 22 (Tue)		Wisconsin All Stars		---

== Regular season ==
=== Schedule ===
Week	Date	Kickoff	Opponent	Results		Attendance
Week	Date	Kickoff	Opponent	Final Score	Team record	
1	Bye					
2	March 5 (Sat)	7:05pm	at Bloomington Extreme	L 26-42	0-1	4,523
3	March 12 (Sat)	7:05pm	at Wichita Wild	W 55-41	1-1	4,116
4	March 18 (Fri)	7:30pm	Bloomington Extreme	W 61-51	2-1	NA
5	March 27 (Sun)	4:00pm	at Nebraska Danger	W 48-38	3-1	NA
6	April 1 (Fri)	7:30pm	Richmond Revolution	W 67-47	4-1	3,808
7	Bye					
8	April 15 (Fri)	7:30pm	Reading Express	W 62-19	5-1	NA
9	April 22 (Fri)	7:05pm (9:05 Central)	at Wenatchee Valley Venom	W 60-6	6-1	NA
10	April 29 (Fri)	7:35pm	at Chicago Slaughter	L 39-42	6-2	6,727
11	May 7 (Sat)	7:30pm	La Crosse Spartans	W 44-21	7-2	NA
12	May 15 (Sun)	2:05pm	at Sioux Falls Storm	L 38-57	7-3	NA
13	May 21 (Sat)	7:30pm	Reading Express	W 72-40	8-3	4,369
14	May 27 (Fri)	7:00pm	at La Crosse Spartans	W 66-31	9-3	NA
15	June 4 (Sat)	7:30pm	Lehigh Valley Steelhawks	W 61-25	10-3	NA
16	June 10 (Fri)	7:30pm	Chicago Slaughter	W 65-48	11-3	3,623

=== Standings ===
2011 Great Lakes Division
	W	L	T	PCT	PF	PA	DIV	GB	STK
y Green Bay Blizzard	11	3	0	0.786	764	508	4–2	—	W4
x Bloomington Extreme	9	5	0	0.643	561	473	4–2	2.0	L1
x Chicago Slaughter	8	6	0	0.571	624	627	4–2	3.0	L3
La Crosse Spartans	5	9	0	0.357	495	633	0–6	6.0	W1

== Postseason ==
=== Schedule ===
Week	Date	Kickoff	Opponent	Results	
Week	Date	Kickoff	Opponent	Final Score	Team record
1	Bye				
2	June 25 (Sat)	7:30pm	Reading Express	W 68-51	---
3	July 9 (Sat)	7:05pm	at Sioux Falls Storm	L 12-52	---

== Roster ==
2011 Green Bay Blizzard roster
Quarterback: 12 Willie Copeland; Running back: 16 DeMaudray Woolridge; Wide receiver: 12 Cedric Hill; 9 Bryan Pray; 2 Jameel Sewell; 6 Agim Shabaj	Offensive linemen: 55 Tim Muellar; Defensive linemen: 98 James McClinton; 56 Jeremiah Price; 44 Greg Terrell	Linebacker: 18 Aaron Bryant; 11 Greg Jackson; Defensive back: 7 Arkeith Brown; 3 B. J. Hill; 17 Josh Jones; 21 Roy Polite; Kicker: 19 Joshua Shene	Injured Reserve: currently vacant; Exempt List: currently vacant; Practice squad: currently vacant; rookies in italics Roster updated July 9, 2011; 17 Active, 0 Inactive, 0 PS → More rosters
