= 2011 Bloomington Extreme season =

Indoor Football League team season

- Owner: Ed Brady
- Head coach: Mike Murray
- Home stadium: U.S. Cellular Coliseum; 101 South Madison Street; Bloomington, IL 60701

Results
- Record: 9-5
- Division place: 2nd Great Lakes
- Playoffs: Lost UC Semifinals (Blizzard) 30-51

The 2011 Bloomington Extreme season was the team's sixth season as a professional indoor football franchise and third in the Indoor Football League (IFL). One of twenty-two teams competing in the IFL for the 2011 season, the Bloomington, Illinois-based Bloomington Extreme were members of the Great Lakes Division of the United Conference.

Under the leadership of owner Ed Brady, and head coach Mike Murray, the team played their home games at the U.S. Cellular Coliseum in Bloomington, Illinois.

== Schedule ==
Key: Win Tie Loss Bye

=== Preseason ===
Week	Date	Kickoff	Opponent	Results	
Week	Date	Kickoff	Opponent	Final Score	Team record
	February 20 (Sun)		Cincinnati Commandos		---

=== Regular season ===
Week	Date	Kickoff	Opponent	Results		Stadium	Attendance
Week	Date	Kickoff	Opponent	Final Score	Team record	Stadium	Attendance
1	February 27 (Sun)	3:05 pm	Richmond Revolution	W 44-6	1-0	U.S. Cellular Coliseum	4,413
2	March 5 (Sat)	7:05 pm	Green Bay Blizzard	W 42-26	2-0	U.S. Cellular Coliseum	4,523
3	March 11 (Fri)	7:30 pm (6:30 Central)	at Reading Express	W 44-14	3-0	Sovereign Center	
4	March 18 (Fri)	7:30 pm	at Green Bay Blizzard	L 51-61	3-1	Resch Center	
5	Bye						
6	April 1 (Fri)	7:05 pm	Chicago Slaughter	W 52-44	4-1	U.S. Cellular Coliseum	4,547
7	April 9 (Sat)	7:05 pm (6:05 Central)	at Lehigh Valley Steelhawks	W 30-16	5-1	Stabler Arena	
8	April 16 (Sat)	7:07 pm	Richmond Revolution	W 53-40	6-1	U.S. Cellular Coliseum	4,659
9	April 22 (Fri)	7:00 pm	at La Crosse Spartans	W 71-26	7-1	La Crosse Center	
10	April 29 (Fri)	7:07 pm	Wichita Wild	L 18-20	7-2	U.S. Cellular Coliseum	3,888
11	May 7 (Sat)	7:05 pm	at Sioux Falls Storm	L 28-60	7-3	Sioux Falls Arena	
12	May 14 (Sat)	7:05 pm	at Chicago Slaughter	L 16-42	7-4	Sears Centre	4,697
13	May 21 (Sat)	7:07 pm	Nebraska Danger	W 45-27	8-4	U.S. Cellular Coliseum	4,421
14	Bye						
15	June 3 (Fri)	7:07 pm	La Crosse Spartans	W 45-29	9-4	U.S. Cellular Coliseum	4,229
16	June 11 (Sat)	7:05 pm	at Wichita Wild	L 22-62	9-5	Hartman Arena	2,980

== Postseason ==
Week	Date	Kickoff	Opponent	Results		Stadium	Attendance
Week	Date	Kickoff	Opponent	Final Score	Team record	Stadium	Attendance
1	June 18 (Sat)	7:00 pm	at Omaha Beef	L 34-39	9-6		

== Roster ==
2011 Bloomington Extreme roster
Quarterbacks: 2 Rocky Hinds; Running backs: 23 Andre Raymond; Wide receivers: 5 John Cooper; 4 Johnny Gray; 9 Glenn Johnson; 1 James Walton	Offensive linemen: 77 Aric Flowers; 72 Ray Krishock; 69 Jason Lato; 55 Prenny Stokes; Defensive linemen: 40 Antonio Ficklin; 96 Quince Holman; 7 Sean Kelly; 97 Jeff Sobol	Linebackers: 8 Ray Michel; 56 Winston Taylor; Defensive backs: 21 Calvin Bini; 27 Michael McGee; 24 Terrill Mayberry; 25 James Temple; 6 Marcus Winn; Kickers: 15 Steven Fetzer	Injured Reserve: 22 Peter Christofilakos K (IR); Exempt List: currently vacant; Refused to Report: currently vacant; rookies in italics Roster updated June 18, 2011; 22 Active, 1 Inactive → More rosters

== Standings ==
2011 Great Lakes Division
	W	L	T	PCT	PF	PA	DIV	GB	STK
y Green Bay Blizzard	11	3	0	0.786	764	508	4–2	—	W4
x Bloomington Extreme	9	5	0	0.643	561	473	4–2	2.0	L1
x Chicago Slaughter	8	6	0	0.571	624	627	4–2	3.0	L3
La Crosse Spartans	5	9	0	0.357	495	633	0–6	6.0	W1
