= 2011 West Texas Roughnecks season =

Indoor Football League team season

- Owner: Jay Morris; Dale Morris
- Head coach: Chris Williams
- Home stadium: Ector County Coliseum; 4201 Andrews Highway; Odessa, TX 79762

Results
- Record: 10-4
- Division place: 2nd Lonestar
- Playoffs: Lost Wildcard (Fever) 49-61

The 2011 West Texas Roughnecks season was the team's eighth season as a professional indoor football franchise and second in the Indoor Football League (IFL). One of twenty-two teams competing in the IFL for the 2011 season, the Odessa, Texas-based West Texas Roughnecks were members of the Lonestar Division of the Intense Conference.

The Roughnecks lost to the Tri-Cities Fever in the first round of the IFL playoffs.

== Regular season ==
=== Schedule ===
Week	Date	Kickoff	Opponent	Results	
Week	Date	Kickoff	Opponent	Final score	Team record
0*	February 21 (Mon)	7:11pm	Bricktown Brawlers	W 39-22	1-0
1	February 28 (Mon)	7:05pm	at Allen Wranglers	W 60-46	2-0
2	Bye				
3	Bye				
4	March 20 (Sun)	3:05pm	at Bricktown Brawlers	L 27-31	2-1
5	March 25 (Fri)	7:11pm	Amarillo Venom	W 37-34	3-1
6	April 1 (Fri)	7:05pm	at Wichita Wild	W 54-47	4-1
7	April 8 (Fri)	7:05pm	at Allen Wranglers	L 28-33	4-2
8	April 16 (Sat)	7:11pm	Omaha Beef	W 39-16	5-2
9	April 23 (Sat)	7:05pm	at Amarillo Venom	W 66-23	6-2
10	Bye				
11	May 7 (Sat)	7:05pm (8:05pm Central)	at Arizona Adrenaline	W 82-27	7-2
12	May 14 (Sat)	7:11pm	Allen Wranglers	L 26-54	7-3
13	May 21 (Sat)	7:11pm	Wichita Wild	L 21-22	7-4
14	May 28 (Sat)	7:05pm	at Bricktown Brawlers **	W 48-6	8-4
15	June 4 (Sat)	7:11pm	Arizona Adrenaline	W 92-6	9-4
16	June 11 (Sat)	7:11pm	Amarillo Venom	W 37-24	10-4

* = Kickoff Classic Weekend, before week 1 starts.
** = Replacement Team.

=== Standings ===
2011 Lonestar Division
	W	L	T	PCT	PF	PA	DIV	GB	STK
y Allen Wranglers	10	4	0	0.714	664	510	7–2	—	W2
x West Texas Roughnecks	10	4	0	0.714	656	391	6–3	—	W3
Amarillo Venom	4	10	0	0.286	529	522	3–6	6.0	L1
Bricktown Brawlers (Note: Last four games were losses played by replacements teams.)	2	12	0	0.143	292	717	2–7	8.0	L10

== Postseason ==
=== Schedule ===
Week	Date	Kickoff	Opponent	Results	
Week	Date	Kickoff	Opponent	Final score	Team record
1	June 20 (Mon)	7:00pm (9:00 Central)	at Tri-Cities Fever	L 49-61	---

== Roster ==
2011 West Texas Roughnecks roster
Quarterbacks: 7 K. J. Black; 5 Arkelon Hall; Running backs: 23 Evin Jones; 22 DeWayne Hogan; Wide receivers: 3 Ryan Bugg; 14 Tim Bush; 10 Ashlan Davis; 11 Josh Floyd; 1 Wilson Kimble	Offensive linemen: 79 Ron Jackson; 67 Anthony Piniero; 62 Rob Powell-Deppe; Defensive linemen: 55 Jermaine Blakely; 56 William Council; 44 Ronnie Mason; 57 Lantz Mathers; 4 Jeramie Richardson	Linebackers: 9 Eric Henri; Defensive backs: 2 Anthony Beck; 8 Derrick Boyd; 17 Tray Hardaway; 6 Marrio Norman; 12 Clarence Wright; Kickers: 19 Zeke Arevalo	Injured Reserve: currently vacant; Inactive Roster: currently vacant; Practice squad: currently vacant; rookies in italics Roster updated June 20, 2011; 23 Active, 0 Inactive, 0 PS → More rosters
