= 2011 Reading Express season =

Indoor Football League team season

- Owner: Ted Lavender; Lisa Lavender
- Head coach: Mark Steinmeyer
- Home stadium: Sovereign Center; 700 Penn Street; Reading, PA 19602

Results
- Record: 8-6
- Division place: 1st Atlantic
- Playoffs: Won Wild Card Round (Slaughter) 76-33; Lost Conference Semi-Finals (Blizzard) 51-68

The 2011 Reading Express season was the sixth season as a professional indoor football franchise and their first in the Indoor Football League (IFL). One of twenty-two teams competing in the IFL for the 2011 season, the Reading Express were members of the Atlantic Division of the United Conference.

The team played their home games under head coach Mark Steinmeyer at the Sovereign Center in Reading, Pennsylvania. The Express earned an 8–6 record, placing 1st in the Atlantic Division.

== Schedule ==
Key: Win Tie Loss Bye

=== Regular season ===
All start times are local to home team

Week	Day	Date	Kickoff	Opponent	Results		Location
Week	Day	Date	Kickoff	Opponent	Score	Record	Location
0*	BYE						
1	Sunday	February 26	7:00pm	Lehigh Valley Steelhawks	W 33–26	1–0	Sovereign Center
2	Saturday	March 5	7:05pm	at Chicago Slaughter	L 55–59	1-1	Sears Centre
3	Friday	March 11	7:30pm	Bloomington Extreme	L 14–44	1–2	Sovereign Center
4	Sunday	March 20	4:00pm	Arizona Adrenaline	W 31–14	2-2	Sovereign Center
5	BYE						
6	Friday	April 1	7:30pm	Lehigh Valley Steelhawks	W 63–58	3–2	Sovereign Center
7	Saturday	April 9	7:00pm	at Richmond Revolution	W 25–14	4–2	Arthur Ashe Athletic Center
8	Friday	April 15	7:30pm	at Green Bay Blizzard	L 19–62	4–3	Resch Center
9	Saturday	April 23	7:05pm	at Lehigh Valley Steelhawks	W 40–37	5–3	Stabler Arena
10	Saturday	April 30	7:00pm	Richmond Revolution	W 49–28	6–3	Sovereign Center
11	Sunday	May 8	4:00pm	at Lehigh Valley Steelhawks	W 51–14	7–3	Stabler Arena
12	Sunday	May 15	4:30pm	Fairbanks Grizzlies	L 45–60	7–4	Sovereign Center
13	Saturday	May 21	7:30pm	at Green Bay Blizzard	L 40–72	7–5	Stabler Arena
14	BYE						
15	Saturday	June 4	8:00pm	Richmond Revolution	W 76–7	8–5	Sovereign Center
16	Saturday	June 11	7:00pm	at Richmond Revolution	L 14–42	8–6	Arthur Ashe Athletic Center

* Kickoff Classic week

=== Playoffs ===
Week	Day	Date	Kickoff	Opponent	Results		Location
Week	Day	Date	Kickoff	Opponent	Score	Record	Location
1	Saturday	June 18	7:00pm	Chicago Slaughter	W 76–33	1–0	Sovereign Center
2	Saturday	June 25	7:30pm	at Green Bay Blizzard	L 51–68	1-1	Resch Center

== Roster ==
2011 Reading Express roster
Quarterbacks: 3 Chris Malleo; 14 Bill Winters; Running backs: 8 Matt Sola; Wide receivers: 6 Mike McCoy; 1 Collin Taylor; 18 Elliott White; 21 Jeff Willis	Offensive linemen: -- Will Keglar; 71 Michael Lewis; 54 Chris Nunn; 59 Mark Stout; Defensive linemen: 68 Greg Brown; 48 Ian Dell; 11 Mike Dell; 90 Daniel Orlebar	Linebackers: 4 Anthony Kelly; 51 Michael Thompson; Defensive backs: 2 Jesse Cooper; 7 Clarence Curry; -- Aaron Moore; 5 Armar Watson; 23 Anthony Wood; Kickers: 25 Eric Rockhold	Injured Reserve: currently vacant; Exempt List: currently vacant; Practice squad: currently vacant; Roster updated June 25, 2011; 23 Active, 0 Inactive, 0 PS → More rosters

== Division Standings ==
2011 Atlantic Division
	W	L	T	PCT	PF	PA	DIV	GB	STK
y Reading Express	8	6	0	0.571	525	516	7–1	—	L1
Lehigh Valley Steelhawks	4	10	0	0.286	432	595	3–5	4.0	L2
Richmond Revolution	3	11	0	0.214	441	593	2–6	5.0	W1
