= 2011 Wichita Wild season =

Indoor Football League team season

- Owner: Wink Hartman
- Head coach: Morris Lolar (interim); Ken Matous (fired April 11; 0-5 record)
- Home stadium: Hartman Arena; 8151 N. Hartman Arena Drive; Park City, KS 67147

Results
- Record: 6-8
- Division place: 3rd Great Plains
- Playoffs: did not qualify

The 2011 Wichita Wild season was the team's fifth season as a professional indoor football franchise and third in the Indoor Football League (IFL). One of twenty-two teams competing in the IFL for the 2011 season, the Park City, Kansas-based Wichita Wild were members of the Great Plains Division of the Intense Conference.

Under the leadership of interim head coach Morris Lolar, who took over for Ken Matous after an 0–5 start, the team played their home games at the Hartman Arena in Park City, Kansas.

== Schedule ==
Key: Win Tie Loss Bye

=== Regular season ===
All start times are local time

Week	Day	Date	Kickoff	Opponent	Results		Location	Attendance
Week	Day	Date	Kickoff	Opponent	Score	Record	Location	Attendance
1	BYE							
2	Monday	March 7	7:05pm	at Nebraska Danger	L 59-70	0-1	Eihusen Arena	
3	Saturday	March 12	7:05pm	Green Bay Blizzard	L 41-55	0-2	Hartman Arena	4,116
4	BYE							
5	Saturday	March 26	7:05pm	Sioux Falls Storm	L 20-92	0-3	Hartman Arena	3,580
6	Friday	April 1	7:05pm	West Texas Roughnecks	L 47-54	0-4	Hartman Arena	3,042
7	Saturday	April 9	7:05pm	at Omaha Beef	L 24-36	0-5	Omaha Civic Auditorium	2,800
8	Saturday	April 16	7:05pm	Amarillo Venom	W 56-32	1-5	Hartman Arena	3,048
9	Saturday	April 23	7:05pm	at Allen Wranglers	L 44-56	1-6	Allen Event Center	
10	Friday	April 29	7:05pm	at Bloomington Extreme	W 20-18	2-6	U. S. Cellular Coliseum	
11	Saturday	May 7	7:00pm	at Bricktown Brawlers	W 51-14	3-6	Cox Convention Center	
12	Saturday	May 14	7:05pm	Omaha Beef	L 44-48	3-7	Hartman Arena	3,546
13	Saturday	May 21	7:05pm	at West Texas Roughnecks	W 22-21	4-7	Ector County Coliseum	
14	Saturday	May 28	7:05pm	at Sioux Falls Storm	L 16-78	4-8	Sioux Falls Arena	
15	Saturday	June 4	7:05pm	Nebraska Danger	W 65-22	5-8	Hartman Arena	2,861
16	Saturday	June 11	7:05pm	Bloomington Extreme	W 62-22	6-8	Hartman Arena	2,980

== Roster ==
2011 Wichita Wild roster
Quarterbacks: 5 Marcus Jackson; 3 Phil Staback; Running backs: 7 Darius Fudge; Wide receivers: 9 Donald Fusilier; 11 Brian Murph; 1 Clinton Solomon	Offensive linemen: 53 Brett Cavanah; 50 Calvin Collazo; 66 Wes Yarbough; Defensive linemen: 99 Matt Moss; 64 Dane Robinson; 92 Marques Walton	Linebackers: 18 Xavier Jordan; 48 Kenny Wilson; Defensive backs: 24 Kendrick Harper; 18 Brandon Kaufmann; 6 Randy Kelly; 26 Scooter Rogers; 2 Rashad Washington; Kickers: 21 Dylan Pohlman	Injured Reserve: currently vacant; Exempt List: currently vacant; Refused to Report: currently vacant; rookies in italics Roster updated June 11, 2011; 20 Active, 0 Inactive → More rosters

== Standings ==
2011 Great Plains Division
	W	L	T	PCT	PF	PA	DIV	GB	STK
z Sioux Falls Storm	13	1	0	0.929	1022	457	5–1	—	L1
x Omaha Beef	9	5	0	0.643	615	523	5–1	4.0	W1
Wichita Wild	6	8	0	0.429	571	618	1–5	7.0	W2
Nebraska Danger	3	11	0	0.214	617	788	1–5	10.0	L8
