= 2011 La Crosse Spartans season =

Indoor Football League team season

- Owner: Chris Kokalis
- General manager: Chris Kokalis
- Head coach: Kyle Moore-Brown (Interim); Gilbert Brown (resigned March 31)
- Home stadium: La Crosse Center; 300 Harbor View Plaza; La Crosse, WI 54601

Results
- Record: 5-9
- Division place: 4th Great Lakes
- Playoffs: did not qualify

The 2011 La Crosse Spartans season was the team's second season as a professional indoor football franchise and second in the Indoor Football League (IFL). One of twenty-two teams competing in the IFL for the 2011 season, the La Crosse, Wisconsin-based La Crosse Spartans were members of the Great Lakes Division of the United Conference.

Under the leadership of owner Chris Kokalis, and head coach Kyle Moore-Brown, the team played their home games at the La Crosse Center in La Crosse, Wisconsin.

The season began February 19, 2011, in the IFL’s showcase game, the Kickoff Classic. La Crosse played seven regular season games at home over the course of February through early June. Indoor football veteran Jose Jefferson joined the Spartans for the 2011 season as their Offensive Coordinator.

After four games of the 2011 season it was announced that head coach Gilbert Brown would be taking a leave of absence from the team for personal reasons, and that his brother Kyle Moore-Brown would be switching from assistant coach to head coach of the Spartans.

On April 30, 2011, the Spartans became one of the few teams in indoor football history to post a shutout, beating the Lehigh Valley Steelhawks 51-0.

On August 30, 2011, GM and co-owner Chris Kokalis announced the formation of the Cedar Rapids Titans, including former Spartans members Xzavie Jackson, Travis Miller and Mike Polaski. The Titans were listed as members of the Great Lakes division, along with the Green Bay Blizzard, Bloomington Extreme and Chicago Slaughter, but the Spartans were not listed in this division they were previously in. Kokalis said the Spartans franchise will "cease to exist", but also said that the team was up for sale.

== Schedule ==
Key: Win Tie Loss Bye

=== Preseason ===
Week	Date	Kickoff	Opponent	Results	
Week	Date	Kickoff	Opponent	Final Score	Team Record
	December 31 (Fri)	2:00pm	River City Rough Riders (Family Day Scrimmage)	W 37-7	---

=== Regular season ===
Week	Date	Kickoff	Opponent	Results	
Week	Date	Kickoff	Opponent	Final Score	Team Record
0*	February 19 (Sat)	7:00pm	Chicago Slaughter	L 48-69	0-1
1	Bye				
2	Bye				
3	March 12 (Sat)	7:05pm	at Omaha Beef	L 20-40	0-2
4	March 17 (Thu)	7:00pm	Kent Predators	W 66-28	1-2
5	March 26 (Sat)	7:05pm (6:05 Central)	at Richmond Revolution	W 39-33	2-2
6	April 3 (Sun)	3:00pm	Nebraska Danger	W 50-44	3-2
7	April 9 (Sat)	7:05pm	at Chicago Slaughter	L 40-54	3-3
8	April 15 (Fri)	7:05pm	at Sioux Falls Storm	L 10-77	3-4
9	April 22 (Fri)	7:00pm	Bloomington Extreme	L 26-71	3-5
10	April 30 (Sat)	7:00pm	Lehigh Valley Steelhawks	W 51-0	4-5
11	May 7 (Sat)	7:30pm	at Green Bay Blizzard	L 21-44	4-6
12	Bye				
13	May 21 (Sat)	7:05pm (6:05 Central)	at Richmond Revolution	L 37-40	4-7
14	May 27 (Fri)	7:00pm	Green Bay Blizzard	L 31-66	4-8
15	June 3 (Fri)	7:07pm	at Bloomington Extreme	L 29-45	4-9
16	June 11 (Sat)	7:00pm	Lehigh Valley Steelhawks	W 27-22	5-9

* = Kickoff Classic Game, before week 1 starts.

== Roster ==
La Crosse Spartans roster
Quarterbacks: 5 Ryan Maiuri; 8 Buddy Rivera; Running backs: 3 Hakeem Abdullah; 6 LaRon Council; Wide receivers: 7 Phillip Ditto; 11 Christopher Headd; 16 Aaron Rhea; 18 Emmanuel Spann	Offensive linemen: 67 Courtney Abbott; 70 Juliene Adams; 73 James Washington; 78 Travis Miller; Defensive linemen: 44 Michael Ebanks; 4 Bernard Faithful; 1 Xzavie Jackson; 56 Jeremy Maddox	Linebackers: 9 Joe Bevis; Defensive backs: 20 Jamil Abdullah; 2 Walner Belleus; 21 Kevis Buckley; 37 George Carpenter; 13 Tim Corrish; 26 Richard Chambers; Kickers: 10 Mike Polaski; 30 Rubio Radamez; 10 Jake Bauer	Injured Reserve: 31 Wes McDermott LB (IR); 9 Antonio O'Neil DL (IR); 83 Antonio Overstreet WR (IR); 24 Tommie Williams DB (IR); Inactive: -- Larry Dibbles DL; -- James Dudley Jr. RB; -- Joe Manning DB; -- Jermaine Pruitt OL; -- Steve Smith RB; -- Antawan Walker WR; 36 Brandon White DB; Practice squad: currently vacant; rookies in italics; Roster updated June 1, 2011; 25 Active, 11 Inactive, 0 PS; → More rosters

== Standings ==
2011 Great Lakes Division
	W	L	T	PCT	PF	PA	DIV	GB	STK
y Green Bay Blizzard	11	3	0	0.786	764	508	4–2	—	W4
x Bloomington Extreme	9	5	0	0.643	561	473	4–2	2.0	L1
x Chicago Slaughter	8	6	0	0.571	624	627	4–2	3.0	L3
La Crosse Spartans	5	9	0	0.357	495	633	0–6	6.0	W1
