= John Gonzaga =

American football player (1933–2007)

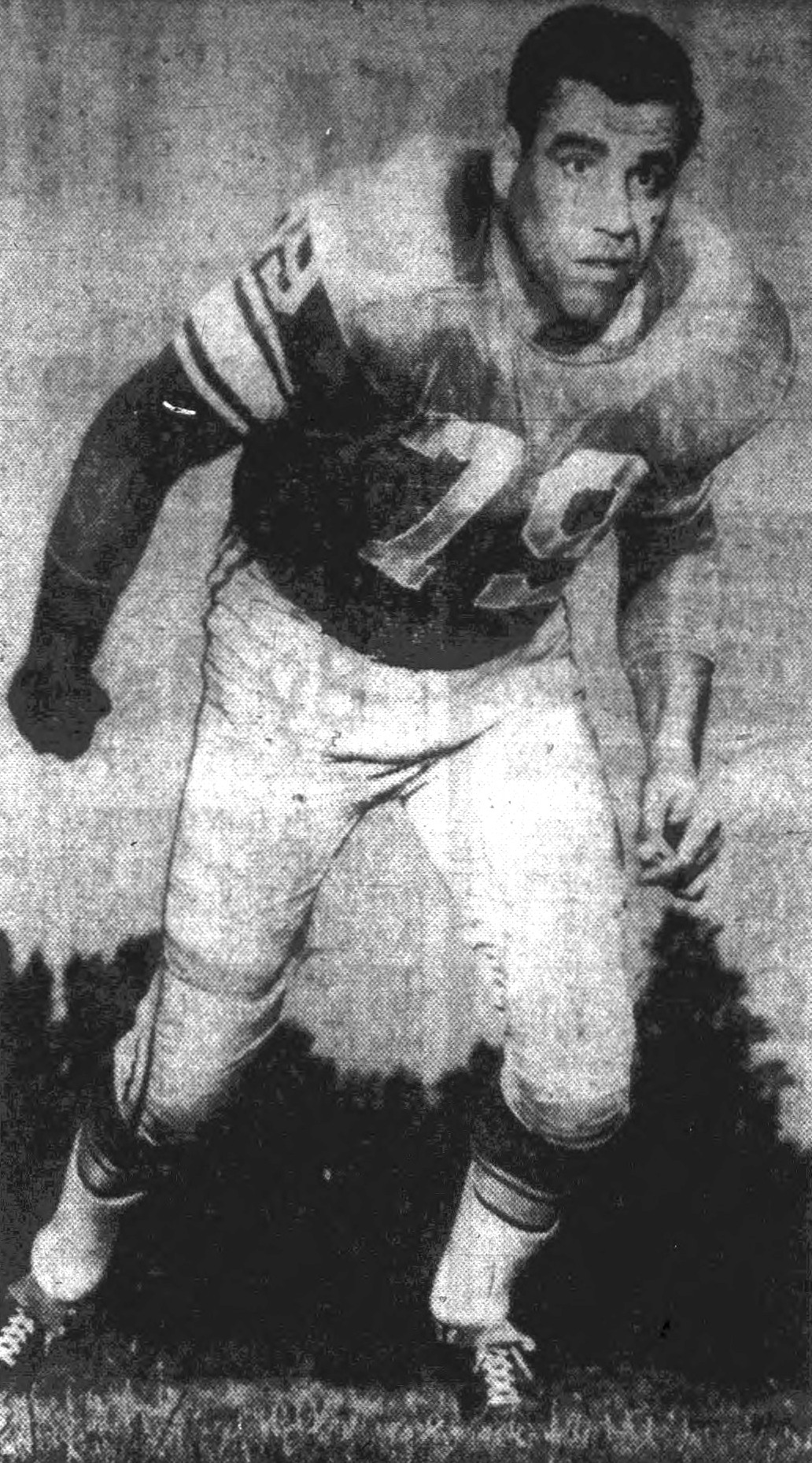
- Gonzaga, circa 1963

No. 76, 79
- Positions: Tackle, guard, defensive end, defensive tackle

Personal information
- Born: March 6, 1933; Martinez, California, U.S.
- Died: May 17, 2007 (aged 74); West Bloomfield Township, Michigan, U.S.
- Listed height: 6 ft 3 in (1.91 m)
- Listed weight: 247 lb (112 kg)

Career information
- High school: Mount Diablo (CA)
- College: None
- NFL draft: 1956: undrafted

Career history
- San Francisco 49ers (1956–1959); Dallas Cowboys (1960); Detroit Lions (1961–1965); Denver Broncos (1966)

Career NFL/AFL statistics
- Games played: 132
- Games started: 90
- Fumble recoveries: 3
- Stats at Pro Football Reference

John Louis Gonzaga (March 6, 1933 – May 17, 2007) was an American football offensive lineman in the National Football League (NFL) for the San Francisco 49ers, Dallas Cowboys, and Detroit Lions. He also was a member of the Denver Broncos in the American Football League (AFL). He did not play college football.

== Early life ==
Gonzaga attended Mount Diablo High School, but did not attend college, instead going to work to help support his family. He continued to be involved in the sport by playing sandlot football.

== Professional career ==
=== San Francisco 49ers ===
On October 21, 1956, he was signed as an undrafted free agent by the San Francisco 49ers, though he never played a down of college football and he was working in a steel mill.

As a rookie, he played at middle linebacker. In 1957, he was used as a two-way right tackle. In 1958, he was moved to left tackle, where he started for two seasons.

=== Dallas Cowboys ===
Gonzaga was selected by the Dallas Cowboys in the 1960 NFL expansion draft and became the first starter at right defensive end in franchise history, while also leading the team in sacks.

On August 21, 1961, after asking to be traded, he was sent to the Detroit Lions in exchange for offensive guard Bob Grottkau and rookie Houston Entwine.

=== Detroit Lions ===
The Detroit Lions moved him to left tackle in his first two seasons with the team and then changed him to left guard. After being a five-year starter, he was released on August 30, 1966.

=== Denver Broncos (AFL) ===
On September 6, 1966, he was signed as a free agent by the Denver Broncos of the American Football League. He played right guard in 11 games.

== Personal life ==
Gonzaga came from a family of 14 children and was of Portuguese descent. He worked as a sales manager for Ford Motor Company glass division, until starting his own glass company. He died on May 20, 2007, at his home in West Bloomfield, Michigan, after battling an illness.
