= Mount Diablo High School =

Public high school in California, United States

Coordinates: 37°58′59″N 122°2′8″W

Location
- 2450 Grant Street; Concord, California 94520; United States

Information
- School type: Public high school
- Motto: "Victory With Honor"
- Founded: 1901
- School district: Mount Diablo Unified School District
- Superintendent: Adam Clark
- Principal: Markell McCain
- Teaching staff: 74.77 (FTE)
- Grades: 9-12
- Enrollment: 1,477 (2023-2024)
- Student to teacher ratio: 19.75
- Language: English
- Colors: Crimson and green
- Mascot: Danny the Devil
- Team name: Red Devils
- Website: mdhs.mdusd.org

Mount Diablo High School is a public high school located in Concord, California, United States. It is the oldest school in the Mount Diablo Unified School District, founded in April 1901. The school currently serves western Concord, the unincorporated communities of Bay Point and Clyde and a portion of Pittsburg.

== Academies ==
The school features several specialized programs, known as "academies". Originally these were opt-in; a student could join an academy or choose to pursue their education without taking academy classes. Beginning in 2012 all sophomores and freshmen and all incoming students were required to enroll in one of four academies. While this decision was controversial, Mount Diablo High School continued, until the 2023-2024 academic school year, to house all students from grades 9-12 within these four California Partnership Academies, in addition to the World Academy, which serves students who are new to the country and English language education. However, starting in the 2023-2024 school year, the school began to pull back from the California Partnership Academy model and transitioned the former academy courses into pathway electives any student could choose. This change began the 2022-2023 school year with the removal of the Academy of Construction & Mechanical Engineering (ACME), and the other three academies followed in August 2023.

The academies are:

- The Digital Safari Multimedia Academy program, started in 1996, teaches and integrates digital media into a high school core curriculum using project-based learning.
- The International Hospitality and Tourism Academy (IHTA) is a campus program which teaches cooking and hospitality. The program includes the student-run restaurant Serendipity, which operates three days a week and is supported by the students' mentors as well as professional chefs and bakers. IHTA also incorporates the Sustainable Hospitality Pathway, which focuses its nutrition and food prep classes on career fields including healthy food service, agri- and eco-tourism, and outdoor recreation.
- Academy of Construction & Mechanical Engineering (ACME)
- Medical Bio-Technology Academy (MBTA)
- The World Academy, serving students who are newcomers to the United States.

MDHS also has an active Junior Reserve Officers' Training Corps (JROTC). At one time, it also offered a FAME (Fine Arts, Media, Entertainment) Academy.

== History ==
Although there were grammar schools in the area throughout the 1890s, the nearest high schools were in Berkeley and Oakland. In 1901, voters established what was then known as the Mt. Diablo Unified School District, and classes were held in various temporary locations for the first two years, including the grammar school on Willow Pass Road and the Odd Fellows hall at the corner of what are now Salvio and Colfax Streets. On 14 February 1903, district trustees voted to construct the first MDHS building, which opened in 1904 and was torn down in 1963.

== Digital Safari Academy ==
The Digital Safari Academy (DSA) was founded in the autumn of 1996 on a U.S. Department of Education grant to integrate vocational education with the core academic curriculum. The goal was to do this with professional multimedia design tools. Instead of using educational software, they would attempt to make it. Thus, as students who studied earth science, they would create interactive programs about the universe or geology. As they studied English they would create interactive book reports or websites about their favorite poets. As they studied social science, they would develop websites for model e-businesses or a CD-ROM about World War II.

Since 1997, the Digital Safari Academy has won two awards in the California Student Media Festival. In the spring of 2001, the academy produced a seven-day webcast of the International Science and Engineering Fair. The Digital Safari Academy, from 2007 through today, offers design services to businesses, non-profits, and other community organizations, through an annual internship program. The DSA's project design methodology has been adapted by numerous programs around the country. A majority of DSA graduates have chosen to continue their education beyond high school, choosing state and community colleges, graphic arts schools, or technical schools. The number of graduates in the multimedia and technical industries is growing, as more former students finish their career training.

In 2013 the Digital Safari Academy expanded its course offerings even further to serve a larger student population: freshmen now participate in an Art and Design course that articulates for possible community college credit, and the original 10th-12th grade Multimedia pathway now runs parallel to a new Interactive Design pathway, which focuses on web design, game design, and software application development.

== Notable alumni ==
- Daniel Colchico (1935-2014), National Football League player
- John Gonzaga, National Football League player
- Dennis Havrilla, Arena Football League player
- Todd Lichti, National Basketball Association player
