= Dan Colchico =

American football player (1935–2014)

- Colchico in 1961

No. 86
- Position: Defensive end

Personal information
- Born: May 27, 1937; Berkeley, California, U.S.
- Died: April 27, 2014 (aged 76); Concord, California, U.S.
- Listed height: 6 ft 4 in (1.93 m)
- Listed weight: 236 lb (107 kg)

Career information
- High school: Mount Diablo (Concord)
- College: Diablo Valley JC; San Jose State
- NFL draft: 1959: 7th round, 78th overall pick
- AFL draft: 1960: 1st round

Career history

Playing
- San Francisco 49ers (1960–1967); New Orleans Saints (1968–1969)

Coaching
- San Francisco 49ers (1967) Defensive line coach

Career NFL statistics
- Fumble recoveries: 7
- Sacks: 27.5
- Stats at Pro Football Reference

Daniel Mametta Colchico (May 27, 1937 – April 27, 2014) was an American athlete who played defensive end in the National Football League (NFL).

== Biography ==
=== Early life ===
Dan Colchico was born May 27, 1937, in Port Chicago, California, part of the San Francisco Bay Area. His father, an immigrant from Italy, was killed in an industrial accident when Dan was 6 years old.

Colchico was a tough child from a tough neighborhood who was naturally athletic from an early age. Particularly skilled on the football field, Colchico graduated from Mt. Diablo High School and attended Diablo Valley Junior College in Pleasant Hill, California before winning a scholarship to play at San Jose State College.

=== Collegiate career ===
After graduating from Diablo Valley Junior College, Colchico entered San Jose State in February 1957. Wearing jersey number 88, Colchico was soon starting for the Spartans at the Right End position.

=== Professional career ===
Colchico was drafted by the San Francisco 49ers in the seventh round (78th overall) of the 1959 NFL draft. He was a member of the San Francisco 49ers organization for seven years from 1960 to 1967 (played 1960–1965 – in 1966 he performed Public Relations duties while in rehab for a ruptured Achilles tendon and upon being denied clearance to play by the 49er medical staff, was hired as the Defensive Line Coach in 1967) and played two seasons for the New Orleans Saints (1968-1969) before retiring from the NFL.

=== Death and legacy ===
Dan Colchico died April 27, 2014, at his home in Concord, California, from complications due to heart surgery. He was 78 years old at the time of his death.

Among other accolades Dan was an Associated Press and United Press International All-American Honorable Mention during his collegiate career.

In 1962 Colchico was awarded the Len Eshmont Award, an award granted by the San Francisco 49ers to the player best exemplifying inspirational and courageous play and regarded as the highest team honor.

Colchico was also an inductee of the San Jose State Alumni Hall of Fame.

Colchico donated his brain to Boston University chronic traumatic encephalopathy Research Program with the hope of having others gain insight into the correlation of subconcussions received through playing Football and how it relates to addictive behavior, depression, impulse control and dementia. His brain samples subsequently showed he had chronic traumatic encephalopathy. He was one of at least 345 NFL players to be diagnosed after death with this disease, which is caused by repeated hits to the head.
