= 2011 Fairbanks Grizzlies season =

Indoor Football League team season

- Owner: Chad Dittman; Ricky Bertz; Michael Taylor
- Head coach: Robert Fuller
- Home stadium: Carlson Center

Results
- Record: 10–4
- Division place: 1st Pacific
- Playoffs: Lost IC Semifinals (Wranglers) 54–72

The 2011 Fairbanks Grizzlies season was the team's fourth season as a professional indoor football franchise and third in the Indoor Football League (IFL). One of twenty-two teams that competed in the IFL for the 2011 season, the Fairbanks, Alaska-based Fairbanks Grizzlies finished first in the Pacific Division of the Intense Conference. Under head coach Robert Fuller, the team played their home games at the Carlson Center in Fairbanks, Alaska.

== Preseason ==
=== Schedule ===
Week	Date	Kickoff	Opponent	Results	
Week	Date	Kickoff	Opponent	Final score	Team record
	February 21 (Mon)		Alaska Football League All Stars	W 62-10	

== Regular season ==
=== Schedule ===
Key: Win Tie Loss Bye

Week	Date	Kickoff	Opponent	Results	
Week	Date	Kickoff	Opponent	Final score	Team record
1	February 27 (Sun)	4:05pm	Wenatchee Valley Venom	L 37-45	0-1
2	March 6 (Sun)	3:05pm (2:05 Alaska)	at Kent Predators (later changed name to Seattle Timberwolves)	L 41-56	0-2
3	March 12 (Sat)	7:05pm (6:05 Alaska)	at Tri-Cities Fever	L 35-50	0-3
4	March 18 (Fri)	7:05pm	Allen Wranglers	W 57-37	1-3
5	March 26 (Sat)	7:05pm (6:05 Alaska)	at Wenatchee Valley Venom	W 50-43	2-3
6	April 1 (Fri)	7:05pm (6:05 Alaska)	@Kent Predators (later changed name to Seattle Timberwolves)	W 31-30	3-3
7	April 8 (Fri)	7:05pm	Arizona Adrenaline	W 92-32	4-3
8	Bye				
9	April 22 (Fri)	7:05pm	Chicago Slaughter	W 40-35	5-3
10	April 29 (Fri)	7:05pm	Wenatchee Valley Venom	W 78-33	6-3
11	May 7 (Sat)	7:05pm	Tri-Cities Fever	W 58-20	7-3
12	May 15 (Sun)	4:30pm (12:30 Alaska)	@Reading Express	W 60-45	8-3
13	May 21 (Sat)	7:05pm (3:05 Alaska)	at Lehigh Valley Steelhawks	L 28-37	8-4
14	May 28 (Sat)	7:05pm (6:05 Alaska)	at Tri-Cities Fever	W 31-28	9-4
15	June 3 (Fri)	7:05pm	Seattle Timberwolves	W 85-54	10-4
16	Bye				

Week	Date	Kickoff	Opponent	Results	
Week	Date	Kickoff	Opponent	Final score	Team record
1	Bye				
2	June 24 (Fri)	7:05pm	Allen Wranglers	L 54-72	---

== Standings ==
2011 Pacific Division
	W	L	T	PCT	PF	PA	DIV	GB	STK
y Fairbanks Grizzlies	10	4	0	0.714	723	545	6–3	—	W2
x Tri-Cities Fever	10	4	0	0.714	816	575	6–3	—	W2
Seattle Timberwolves	5	9	0	0.357	678	796	4–5	5.0	L2
Wenatchee Valley Venom	3	11	0	0.214	508	845	2–7	7.0	L4

== Roster ==
Fairbanks Grizzlies roster
Quarterbacks: 19 Donovan Porterie; 12 Ryan Ratekin; Running backs: 9 Romandre Gibbs; Wide receivers: 5 John Halman; 2 Erick Jones; 7 Desmond Tardy; 1 Tony Taylor	Offensive linemen: 79 Lyndon Brown; 54 Jerome Johnson; 67 James Thompson; 72 Nicholas Thornton-Jack; Defensive linemen: 71 Junior Aumavae; 95 Tyron Hurst; 30 Stephan Smith. Jr.; 54 Bryan Wick	Linebackers: 40 Steve Faoro; 8 Devin Robinson; Defensive backs: 20 Xavier Drakeford; 21 Noah Harris; 15 Thyrell Lewis; 24 James Romain; 3 Daudi White; 13 Kenny Viser; Kickers: 18 Rett Thibodeaux	Injured reserve: Currently vacant; Exempt list: Currently vacant; Practice squad: Currently vacant; Rookies in italics; Roster updated June 24, 2011; 24 Active, 0 Inactive, 0 PS

== Awards ==
Two Fairbanks players earned first-team all-IFL honors: Dre Gibbs (running back) and James Romain (defensive back).
