= Marcus Winn =

American gridiron football player (born 1982)

No. 2
- Position: Defensive back

Personal information
- Born: December 26, 1982 (age 43); Jackson, Mississippi, U.S.
- Listed height: 6 ft 1 in (1.85 m)
- Listed weight: 215 lb (98 kg)

Career information
- College: Alabama State
- NFL draft: 2004: undrafted

Career history
- Edmonton Eskimos (2005–2006); Winnipeg Blue Bombers (2007–2008); Bloomington Extreme (2011–2012); Chicago Slaughter (2012)

Awards and highlights
- Grey Cup champion (2005)

Career CFL statistics
- Tackles: 34
- Sacks: 1
- Fumbles recoveries: 1
- Stats at CFL.ca (archived)

Marcus Winn (born December 26, 1982) is an American former professional football defensive back.

== College career ==
As a senior at the Alabama State University, Winn posted 89 tackles.

== Professional career ==
Winn played two seasons with the Edmonton Eskimos of the Canadian Football League (CFL) before being released in 2007. Marcus Winn was signed by the Winnipeg Blue Bombers of the CFL in 2007.
