= 2011 Chicago Slaughter season =

Indoor Football League team season

- Owner: Jim McMahon
- Head coach: Steve McMichael
- Home stadium: Sears Centre; 101 South Madison Street; Hoffman Estates, IL 60701

Results
- Record: 8-6
- Division place: 3rd Great Lakes
- Playoffs: Lost Wildcard (Express) 33-76

The 2011 Chicago Slaughter season was the team's fifth season as a professional indoor football franchise and second in the Indoor Football League (IFL). One of twenty-two teams competing in the IFL for the 2011 season, the Hoffman Estates, Illinois-based Chicago Slaughter were members of the Great Lakes Division of the United Conference.

Under the leadership of owner Jim McMahon, and head coach Steve McMichael, the team played their home games at the Sears Centre in Hoffman Estates, Illinois.

== Schedule ==
Key: Win Tie Loss Bye

=== Regular season ===
Week	Date	Kickoff	Opponent	Results		Attendance
Week	Date	Kickoff	Opponent	Final score	Team record	Attendance
0*	February 19 (Sat)	7:00pm	at La Crosse Spartans	W 69-48	1-0	3,411
1	February 26 (Sat)	7:05pm	Omaha Beef	L 36-39	1-1	6,912
2	March 5 (Sat)	7:05pm	Reading Express	W 59-55	2-1	3,300
3	Bye					
4	Bye					
5	March 25 (Fri)	7:35pm	Kent Predators	W 37-36	3-1	4,687
6	April 1 (Fri)	7:05pm	at Bloomington Extreme	L 44-52	3-2	4,547
7	April 9 (Sat)	7:05pm	La Crosse Spartans	W 54-40	4-2	3,732
8	April 16 (Sat)	7:05pm (6:05 Central)	at Lehigh Valley Steelhawks	W 52-27	5-2	
9	April 22 (Fri)	7:05pm (10:05 Central)	at Fairbanks Grizzlies	L 35-40	5-3	
10	April 29 (Fri)	7:35pm	Green Bay Blizzard	W 42-39	6-3	6,727
11	May 7 (Sat)	7:05pm (6:05 Central)	at Richmond Revolution	W 49-46	7-3	
12	May 14 (Sat)	7:05pm	Bloomington Extreme	W 42-16	8-3	4,697
13	May 21 (Sat)	7:05pm	at Omaha Beef	L 29-48	8-4	
14	Bye					
15	June 4 (Sat)	7:05pm	Sioux Falls Storm	L 28-76	8-5	4,536
16	June 10 (Fri)	7:30pm	at Green Bay Blizzard	L 48-65	8-6	3,623

* = Kickoff Classic Game, before week 1 starts.

=== Postseason ===
Week	Date	Kickoff	Opponent	Results	
Week	Date	Kickoff	Opponent	Final score	Team record
1	June 18 (Sat)	7:00pm (6:00 Central)	at Reading Express	L 33-76	---

== Roster ==
2011 Chicago Slaughter roster
Quarterbacks: 4 Juice Williams; Running backs: 26 Tim Blackwell; 3 Daniel DuFrene; 15 Anthony Kropp; Wide receivers: 16 Terry Love; 11 Shatone Powers; 7 Patrick Rouzzard; 2 Eyad Salem	Offensive linemen: 71 Jason Baksas; 77 Anthony Bullock; 97 Marvin Campbell; 75 Rasche Hill; 66 Nerraw McCormack; Defensive linemen: 92 Mike Berry; 14 Jon Kowalyshen; 90 Joe Peters; 1 Malcolm Woolridge	Linebackers: 69 Chris Pisani; 8 Lenny Radtke; Defensive backs: 12 Daniel Jackson; 30 Milton Moses; 9 Lowell Robinson; 6 Christopher Rodgers; 32 Jimmy Toussaint; Kickers: 19 Chris Nendick	Injured Reserve: currently vacant; Exempt List: currently vacant; Refused to Report: currently vacant; rookies in italics Roster updated June 8, 2012; 25 Active, 0 Inactive → More rosters

== Standings ==
2011 Great Lakes Division
	W	L	T	PCT	PF	PA	DIV	GB	STK
y Green Bay Blizzard	11	3	0	0.786	764	508	4–2	—	W4
x Bloomington Extreme	9	5	0	0.643	561	473	4–2	2.0	L1
x Chicago Slaughter	8	6	0	0.571	624	627	4–2	3.0	L3
La Crosse Spartans	5	9	0	0.357	495	633	0–6	6.0	W1
