= 2011 Richmond Revolution season =

Indoor Football League team season

- Owner: SportsQuest
- General manager: Charlie Hildbold
- Head coach: Tony Hawkins
- Home stadium: Arthur Ashe Athletic Center; 2010 Second Avenue; Richmond, VA 99701

Results
- Record: 3-11
- Division place: 3rd Atlantic
- Playoffs: did not qualify

The 2011 Richmond Revolution season was the team's second season as a professional indoor football franchise and second in the Indoor Football League (IFL). One of twenty-two teams competing in the IFL for the 2011 season, the Richmond, Virginia-based Richmond Revolution were members of the Atlantic Division of the United Conference.

Under the leadership of head coach Tony Hawkins, the team played their home games at the Arthur Ashe Athletic Center in Richmond, Virginia.

== Regular season ==
=== Schedule ===
Key: Win Tie Loss Bye

Week	Date	Kickoff	Opponent	Results	
Week	Date	Kickoff	Opponent	Final Score	Team Record
1	February 27 (Sun)	3:05pm (4:05 Eastern)	at Bloomington Extreme	L 6-44	0-1
2	March 5 (Sat)	7:05pm	Lehigh Valley Steelhawks	L 38-41	0-2
3	Bye				
4	March 19 (Sat)	7:00pm	at Lehigh Valley Steelhawks	W 48-45 (OT)	1-2
5	March 26 (Sat)	7:05pm	La Crosse Spartans	L 33-39	1-3
6	April 1 (Fri)	7:30pm (8:30 Eastern)	at Green Bay Blizzard	L 47-67	1-4
7	April 9 (Sat)	7:00pm	Reading Express	L 14-25	1-5
8	April 16 (Sat)	7:07pm (8:07 Eastern)	at Bloomington Extreme	L 40-53	1-6
9	Bye				
10	April 30 (Sat)	7:00pm	at Reading Express	L 28-49	1-7
11	May 7 (Sat)	7:05pm	Chicago Slaughter	L 46-49	1-8
12	May 14 (Sat)	7:05pm	Lehigh Valley Steelhawks	L 35-38	1-9
13	May 21 (Sat)	7:05pm	La Crosse Spartans	W 40-37	2-9
14	May 28 (Sat)	7:00pm	at Lehigh Valley Steelhawks	L 38-46	2-10
15	June 4 (Sat)	8:00pm	at Reading Express	L 7-46	2-11
16	June 11 (Sat)	7:05pm	Reading Express	W 21-14	3-11

== Standings ==
2011 Atlantic Division
	W	L	T	PCT	PF	PA	DIV	GB	STK
y Reading Express	8	6	0	0.571	525	516	7–1	—	L1
Lehigh Valley Steelhawks	4	10	0	0.286	432	595	3–5	4.0	L2
Richmond Revolution	3	11	0	0.214	441	593	2–6	5.0	W1

== Roster ==
Richmond Revolution roster
Quarterbacks: 10 Theron Davis; 4 Monte Purvis; Running backs: 21 Anthony Jones; Wide receivers: 9 Donnie Avant; 11 Scorpio Brown; 23 Keion Snead; 5 Justin Spruill	Offensive linemen: 55 Allen Joyner; 56 Aswad McLane; 65 Andrae Townsel; Defensive linemen: 88 Reggie Dorsainvil; -- Tyrell Henderson; 53 Tyrrell Herndon	Linebackers: 19 Stanley Jones; Defensive backs: 1 Daninelle Derricott; 42 Julius Floyd; 24 Andre Lipscomb; 23 Lance Slaughter; Kickers: 15 Justin Parker	Injured Reserve: currently vacant; Exempt List: currently vacant; Practice squad: currently vacant; rookies in italics; Roster updated June 11, 2011; 19 Active, 0 Inactive, 0 PS; → More rosters
