= Independent Indoor Football Alliance =

- Current season, competition or edition: 2012 IIFA Season
- Sport: Indoor football
- Founded: 2008
- Founder: Larry Hendrix, Jr.
- Folded: 2012
- No. of teams: 8
- Country: United States
- Last champion: East Texas Wranglers

The Independent Indoor Football Alliance (IIFA) was a professional indoor football league based in the state of Texas. The league played an abbreviated 2009 season punctuated by a number of forfeits. The league grew and had tighter restrictions for 2010 in hopes of better football action. For the 2011 season, the IIFA joined forces with several independent teams.

== 2008 teams ==
- Kaufman County Crunch – Terrell, Texas 8–3
- Galveston Thunderstorm – Galveston, Texas 7–3
- Corsicana Thunder – Corsicana, Texas 4–5
- Collin County Wranglers – Mckinney, Texas 4–5
- DFW Doom – Euless, Texas 4–6
- Bay Area Buccaneers – Pasadena, Texas 3–6
- Spring Bulls – Spring, Texas 3–4

== 2008 Announced teams that never played ==
These teams were announced by the IIFA at the start of the 2008 season, but never took the field.

- Harris County Militia – Humble, Texas
- Texas Rough Riders – San Antonio, Texas

== 2009 Teams ==
- North Texas Crunch – Forney, Texas 7–3 (Formerly Kaufman County Crunch)
- Texas Krush – Dallas, Texas 2–2
- DFW Doom – Euless, Texas 2–4
- Texas Smash – 1–2
- Texas Wranglers – Mckinney, Texas 3–5

== 2010 Teams ==
- Mid Cities Mustangs – North Richland Hills, Texas 1–4
- Missouri City Blitz – Houston, Texas 0–3
- North Texas Crunch – Southlake, Texas 10–1
- East Texas Drillers – Tyler, Texas 6–4
- Texas Krush – North Richland Hills, Texas 3–8
- Southlake Pirates – Southlake, Texas (Formerly the DFW Doom, sharing the same arena as the North Texas Crunch) 7–3
- Oklahoma Titans – Ardmore, Oklahoma 0–3
- Texas Wranglers – Allen, Texas 2–4

== 2011 Teams ==
- Houston Pirates – 3–6
- North Texas Broncos – 0–5
- North Texas Crunch – 7–3
- East Texas Wranglers – 8–2–1
- Texas Krush – 3–6
- Southlake Pirates – 8–1–1
- Dallas Americans – 0–2

Non-League Teams which played against IIFA teams

- Reno Barons
- Stockton Wolves
- Abilene Ruff Riders

(Both the Wolves and the Barons played under the banner of the "Western Indoor Football Association," the remains of the American Indoor Football Association's West Division.)

Announced 2011 Team that never played

- Conroe Jaguars

== League champions ==
- 2008 – Kaufman County Crunch (defeated Galveston 52–50 in the championship game, Alliance Bowl I)
- 2009 – North Texas Crunch (defeated Texas Wranglers 52–12 in Alliance Bowl II)
- 2010 – North Texas Crunch (defeated Southlake Pirates 10–8 in Alliance Bowl III)
- 2011 – East Texas Wranglers (defeated Southlake Pirates 40–14 in Alliance Bowl IV)
