= 2011 Lehigh Valley Steelhawks season =

Indoor Football League team season

- Owner: Glenn W. Clark
- General manager: Michael Clark
- Head coach: Chris Thompson
- Home stadium: Stabler Arena; 124 Goodman Drive; Bethlehem, Pennsylvania 18015

Results
- Record: 4-10
- Division place: 2nd Atlantic
- Playoffs: did not qualify

The 2011 Lehigh Valley Steelhawks season was the first season as a professional indoor football franchise and their first in the Indoor Football League (IFL). One of 22 teams competing in the IFL for the 2011 season, the Lehigh Valley Steelhawks were members of the Atlantic Division in the United Conference.

In July, 2010, the Indoor Football League (IFL) announced that there would be an expansion franchise placed in Lehigh Valley for the 2011 season. It was also announced that the team would be owned by Glenn W. Clark, a Wilmington, Delaware businessman. Later in July the team announced that they had named Dan Kuhn as the team's general manager and would be holding a "Name The Team" contest was held to choose a name for the organization. Over 700 names were submitted and the top five were chosen by management. These names were Vipers, Ironmen, Blast, Gamblers, and Steelhawks. Fans were then asked to vote on the name they thought would be best for the team with over 70% of the votes being cast for Steelhawks. Brooke Trautwein, the fan who submitted the Steelhawks name, was given a prize package that included season tickets and Steelhawks' merchandise.

The team played their home games under head coach Chris Thompson at the Stabler Arena in Bethlehem, Pennsylvania. The Steelhawks earned a 4-10 record, placing 2nd in the Atlantic Division, and failed to qualify for post-season play.

== Schedule ==
Key: Win Tie Loss Bye

=== Regular season schedule ===
Week	Date	Kickoff	Opponent	Results	
Week	Date	Kickoff	Opponent	Final score	Team record
1	February 26 (Sat)	7:00pm	at Reading Express	L 26-33	0-1
2	March 5 (Sat)	7:05pm	at Richmond Revolution	W 41-38	1-1
3	Bye				
4	March 19 (Sat)	7:00pm	Richmond Revolution	L 45-48 (OT)	1-2
5	Bye				
6	April 1 (Fri)	7:30pm	at Reading Express	L 58-63	1-3
7	April 9 (Sat)	7:05pm	Bloomington Extreme	L 16-30	1-4
8	April 16 (Sat)	7:05pm	Chicago Slaughter	L 27-52	1-5
9	April 23 (Sat)	7:05pm	Reading Express	L 37-40	1-6
10	April 30 (Sat)	7:00pm (8:00 Eastern)	at La Crosse Spartans	L 0-51	1-7
11	May 8 (Sun)	4:00pm	Reading Express	L 14-51	1-8
12	May 14 (Sat)	7:05pm	at Richmond Revolution	W 38-35	2-8
13	May 21 (Sat)	7:05pm	Fairbanks Grizzlies	W 37-28	3-8
14	May 28 (Sat)	7:00pm	Richmond Revolution	W 46-38	4-8
15	June 4 (Sat)	7:30pm (8:30 Eastern)	at Green Bay Blizzard	L 25-61	4-9
16	June 11 (Sat)	7:00pm (8:00 Eastern)	at La Crosse Spartans	L 22-27	4-10

== Roster ==
2011 Lehigh Valley Steelhawks roster
Quarterbacks: 1 Andre Sloan El; 11 A. J. Roque; Running backs: 3 Isaiah Grier; 6 Ryan Leafey; Wide receivers: 81 Matthew Angeloni; 88 Andre Higgins; 8 Quinton Lopez	Offensive linemen: 60 Anthony Amoo; 66 Lloyd Brooks; 58 Jonathan Mitchell; 72 Darryl Watson; Defensive linemen: 62 Chad Clark; 52 Chris Medina; 99 Nweike Osemene; 40 Bryan Tarkington	Linebackers: 22 Matt Cohen; 44 Adrian McLeod; Defensive backs: 7 Isiejah Allen; 13 Theo Hall; 17 Anthony Miles; 4 Roshawn Marshall; 21 Hasan Stewart; 10 Johnnie Taylor; Kickers: 29 Paul Stoltz	Injured Reserve: currently vacant; Exempt List: currently vacant; Practice squad: currently vacant; Roster updated June 11, 2011; 24 Active, 0 Inactive, 0 PS → More rosters

== Division Standings ==
2011 Atlantic Division
	W	L	T	PCT	PF	PA	DIV	GB	STK
y Reading Express	8	6	0	0.571	525	516	7–1	—	L1
Lehigh Valley Steelhawks	4	10	0	0.286	432	595	3–5	4.0	L2
Richmond Revolution	3	11	0	0.214	441	593	2–6	5.0	W1
