= 2011 Amarillo Venom season =

Indoor Football League team season

- Owner: Stephanie Tucker
- Head coach: Rodney Blackshear (games 1–9); Julian Reese (games 10–14)
- Home stadium: Amarillo Civic Center

Results
- Record: 4-10
- Division place: 3rd

The 2011 season was the eighth season for the Amarillo Venom as a football franchise and second in the Indoor Football League (IFL). One of twenty-two teams that competed in the IFL for the 2011 season, the Venom were members of the Lonestar Division of the Intense Conference. Led by head coach Rodney Blackshear for the first 9 games, he was replaced by interim head coach Julian Reese. The team played their home games at the Amarillo Civic Center in Amarillo, Texas.

== Schedule ==
Win Tie Loss Bye

=== Preseason ===
Week	Date	Kickoff	Opponent	Results	
Week	Date	Kickoff	Opponent	Final score	Team record
	February 20 (Sun)	3:05pm	Allen Wranglers	L 25-26	

=== Regular season ===
Week	Date	Kickoff	Opponent	Results		Attendance
Week	Date	Kickoff	Opponent	Final score	Team record	Attendance
1	February 25 (Fri)	7:00pm (8:00 Central)	@Colorado Ice	L 26-37	0-1	
2	Bye					
3	March 13 (Sun)	7:11pm	@Bricktown Brawlers	L 20-29	0-2	
4	March 18 (Fri)	7:05pm	Wyoming Cavalry	L 33-37	0-3	2,564
5	March 25 (Fri)	7:11pm	@West Texas Roughnecks	L 34-37	0-4	
6	April 2 (Sat)	7:05pm	Allen Wranglers	L 51-52	0-5	2,635
7	April 9 (Sat)	7:05pm	Colorado Ice	L 24-27	0-6	2,734
8	April 16 (Sat)	7:05pm	@Wichita Wild	L 32-56	0-7	3,048
9	April 23 (Sat)	7:05pm	West Texas Roughnecks	L 23-66	0-8	
10	April 30 (Sat)	7:05pm	Allen Wranglers	L 20-44	0-9	
11	Bye					
12	May 14 (Sat)	7:05pm	Bricktown Brawlers	W 50-35	1-9	
13	May 21 (Sat)	7:35pm	@Allen Wranglers	W 36-33	2-9	
14	May 28 (Sat)	7:05pm (8:05 Central)	@Arizona Adrenaline	W 79-32	3-9	
15	June 6 (Mon)	7:05pm	Bricktown Brawlers **	W 77-0	4-9	
16	June 11 (Sat)	7:11pm	@West Texas Roughnecks	L 24-37	4-10	

** = Replacement Team.

== Standings ==
2011 Lonestar Division
	W	L	T	PCT	PF	PA	DIV	GB	STK
y Allen Wranglers	10	4	0	0.714	664	510	7–2	—	W2
x West Texas Roughnecks	10	4	0	0.714	656	391	6–3	—	W3
Amarillo Venom	4	10	0	0.286	529	522	3–6	6.0	L1
Bricktown Brawlers (Note: Last four games were losses played by replacements teams.)	2	12	0	0.143	292	717	2–7	8.0	L10

== Roster ==
2011 Amarillo Venom roster
Quarterbacks: 16 Sherard Ellis; Running backs: 4 Marcus Robinson; Wide receivers: 1 Anthony Clark; 3 Raymond Johnson; 8 Bryant Lee; 15 [ohn Roberson	Offensive linemen: 93 Cale Fischer; 84 Kendrick Thompson; Defensive linemen: 63 Barrett Allen; 24 Mario Reese	Linebackers: 11 Edward Cantrell; 34 Vernard Wilkins; Defensive backs: 9 DonTa Bright; 10 Jihad Morris; 6 Arseel Shakoor; 23 Cashmin Thomas; 96 Jared Williams; 91 Kyle Wilson; Kickers: 13 Jordy Finley	Injured reserve: Currently vacant; Exempt list: Currently vacant; Rookies in italics Roster updated June 11, 2011; 19 Active, 0 Inactive
