= 2011 Wyoming Cavalry season =

Indoor Football League team season

- Owner: Mike and Argeri Layton
- General manager: Mike Layton
- Head coach: Dan Maciejczak
- Home stadium: Casper Events Center

Results
- Record: 9-5
- Division place: 2nd Mountain West
- Playoffs: Lost Division Playoff 20-27 (Wranglers)

The 2011 Wyoming Cavalry season was the team's twelfth season as a football franchise and first in the current Indoor Football League (IFL). One of twenty-two teams competing in the IFL for the 2011 season, the Wyoming Cavalry were members of the Intense Conference. Led by head coach Dan Maciejczak, the team played their home games at the Casper Events Center in Casper, Wyoming.

== Schedule ==
Key: Win Tie Loss Bye

Week	Date	Kickoff	Opponent	Results	
Week	Date	Kickoff	Opponent	Final score	Team record
1	Bye				
2	March 6 (Sun)	3:00pm	@Colorado Ice	L 30–39	0-1
3	Bye				
4	March 18 (Fri)	7:05pm (6:05 Mountain)	@Amarillo Venom	W 37–33	1-1
5	March 27 (Sun)	4:05pm	@Arizona Adrenaline	W 55–8	2-1
6	April 1 (Fri)	7:05pm	Arizona Adrenaline	W 70–31	3-1
7	April 8 (Fri)	7:05pm	Bricktown Brawlers	W 63–25	4-1
8	April 17 (Sun)	3:00pm	@Colorado Ice	L 54–59	4-2
9	April 22 (Fri)	7:05pm	Arizona Adrenaline	W 53–12	5-2
10	April 30 (Sat)	7:05pm (6:05 Mountain)	@Omaha Beef	L 24–68	5-3
11	May 7 (Sat)	7:05pm (8:05 Mountain)	@Wenatchee Valley Venom	L 36–41	5-4
12	May 14 (Sat)	7:05pm	Seattle Timberwolves	W 59–39	6-4
13	May 20 (Fri)	7:05pm	Sioux Falls Storm	L 30–70	6-5
14	May 27 (Fri)	7:05pm	Colorado Ice	W 59–53	7-5
15	June 3 (Fri)	7:05pm	Omaha Beef	W 41–33	8-5
16	June 11 (Sat)	7:05pm (6:05 Mountain)	@Nebraska Danger	W 46–44	9-5
Playoffs
1	June 19 (Sun)	5:05pm (4:05 Mountain)	@Allen Wranglers	L 20–27	9-6

== Roster ==
2011 Wyoming Cavalry roster
Quarterbacks: 13 Joe McClain; 16 Matt Strand; Running backs: 21 Josh Schleusner; 22 Johnny Wood; Wide receivers: 11 Brooks Charlton; 12 Dante Dudley; 1 Ayrius Justin; 4 James Everage; 2 James Newson; 80 Shane Sharpley	Offensive linemen: 60 Anthony Bonner; 91 Eugene Engram; 79 Nolan Fisher; 78 Robbie Klinetobe; 54 James Wolff; Defensive linemen: 40 Jacob Calderon; 9 Wacey Coleman; 44 Michael Hodges Jr.; 56 Tomasi Kongaika; 72 Armond Willis	Linebackers: 10 Steve Allen; 17 Fred Holmes; Defensive backs: 7 Emery Beckles; 3 Antar Brame; 19 Michael Eby; 23 Stacy Edwards; 24 Cecil Ellis; 26 Andre' Moyd; 6 Clayton Schleusner; 1 Muhamammed Shamsid-Deen; Kickers: 15 Travis Atter	Injured Reserve: currently vacant; Exempt List: currently vacant; Practice squad: currently vacant; rookies in italics Roster updated June 19, 2011; 29 Active, 0 Inactive, 0 PS → More rosters

== Standings ==
2011 Mountain West Division
	W	L	T	PCT	PF	PA	DIV	GB	STK
z Colorado Ice	11	3	0	0.786	671	492	5–1	—	W1
x Wyoming Cavalry	9	6	0	0.643	677	582	4–2	2.0	L1
Arizona Adrenaline	1	13	0	0.071	326	908	0–6	10.0	L2
