= 2011 Allen Wranglers season =

Indoor Football League team season

- General manager: Drew Pearson
- Head coach: Chris MacKeown
- Offensive coordinator: Special Teams Coordinator Tim Smith Equipment Manager Steve Smith
- Defensive coordinator: Def. Coordinator Quinn Cairo OL / DL Coach Bryan Raymond
- Home stadium: Allen Event Center

Results
- Record: 10-4 (regular season)
- Division place: 1st, Lonestar Division
- Conference place: 2nd, Intense Conference
- Playoffs: Won Intense Conference Wild Card 27-20 (Cavalry); Won Intense Conference Semi-Finals 72-54 (Grizzlies); Lost Intense Conference Championship 46-67 (Fever)

The 2011 Allen Wranglers season was the team's twelfth season as a professional indoor football franchise, second in the Indoor Football League (IFL), and the first as the "Allen Wranglers". The team played their home games at the Allen Event Center in the Dallas suburb of Allen, Texas.

The team finished with a 10-4 regular season and first place in the Lonestar Division. They advanced through two rounds of the IFL playoffs before losing the Intense Conference Championship to the Tri-Cities Fever.

== Off-field moves ==
In October 2010, the team announced that Chris MacKeown would be the Wranglers' head coach for the 2011 season. MacKeown had most recently served as the offensive coordinator for the Arena Football League's Colorado Crush after a stint as head coach and director of football operations for the Amarillo Dusters of af2. During the 2011 season, MacKeown was suspended for one game due to a "verbal incident" with opposing coaches after a game in Amarillo on April 2, 2011.

Logo presented when the Allen franchise was first announced.

Former Dallas Cowboys player Drew Pearson was named general manager of the franchise in early December 2010. John Harris, Vice President of Operations, organized a publicity stunt in February 2011, reporting the team's mascot "Hoss" had been kidnapped and asking fans and the Chick fil-a Cow to help solve the mystery by following clues on the team's Facebook page. The Allen Police Department cooperated by assigning Officer Garrett Courtney, who was also the team's kicker, as lead investigator.

In May 2011, with just over a month remaining in the regular season, the team announced a change in ownership groups.

== Roster moves ==
Former West Texas A&M Buffaloes running back Keithon Flemming joined the Wranglers on May 25, 2011.

After the season, in late July 2011, Wranglers defensive end Keenan Mace signed with the Dallas Cowboys.

== Schedule ==
Win Tie Loss Bye

=== Preseason ===
Week	Day	Date	Kickoff	Opponent	Results		Location
Week	Day	Date	Kickoff	Opponent	Score	Record	Location
1	Sunday	February 20	3:05pm	at Amarillo Venom	W 26-25	1--	Amarillo Civic Center

=== Regular season ===
Week	Day	Date	Kickoff	Opponent	Results		Location
Week	Day	Date	Kickoff	Opponent	Score	Record	Location
1	Monday	February 28	7:05pm	West Texas Roughnecks	L 46-60	0-1	Allen Event Center
2	Sunday	March 6	3:00pm	at Bricktown Brawlers	W 39-36	1-1	Cox Convention Center
3	BYE						
4	Friday	March 18	7:05pm (AKDT)	at Fairbanks Grizzlies	L 37-57	1-2	Carlson Center
5	Friday	March 25	7:00pm	Bricktown Brawlers	W 42-26	2-2	Allen Event Center
6	Saturday	April 2	7:00pm	at Amarillo Venom	W 52-51	3-2	Amarillo Civic Center
7	Friday	April 8	7:05pm	West Texas Roughnecks	W 33-28	4-2	Allen Event Center
8	Saturday	April 16	7:05pm	at Nebraska Danger	L 37-60	4-3	Eihusen Arena
9	Saturday	April 23	7:05pm	Wichita Wild	W 56-44	5-3	Allen Event Center
10	Saturday	April 30	7:05pm	at Amarillo Venom	W 44-20	6-3	Amarillo Civic Center
11	Saturday	May 7	7:05pm	Nebraska Danger	W 49-23	7-3	Allen Event Center
12	Saturday	May 14	7:11pm	at West Texas Roughnecks	W 54-26	8-3	Ector County Coliseum
13	Saturday	May 21	7:05pm	Amarillo Venom	L 33-36	8-4	Allen Event Center
14	BYE						
15	Saturday	June 4	7:05pm (MDT)	at Colorado Ice	W 57-37	9-4	Budweiser Events Center
16	Saturday	June 11	7:00pm	~~Bricktown Brawlers~~**; North Texas Crunch (IIFA)	W 85-6	10-4	Allen Event Center

** The IFL's Bricktown Brawlers based in Oklahoma City had collapsed financially and released all of their players late in the 2011 season. The North Texas Crunch of the Independent Indoor Football Alliance played as a replacement team to fill out the Brawlers' remaining scheduled games.

=== Playoffs ===
Week	Day	Date	Kickoff	Opponent	Results		Location
Week	Day	Date	Kickoff	Opponent	Score	Record	Location
1	Sunday	June 19	5:05pm	Wyoming Cavalry	W 27-20	---	Allen Event Center
2	Friday	June 24	7:05pm (AKDT)	at Fairbanks Grizzlies	W 72-54	---	Carlson Center
3	Saturday	July 9	7:00pm	Tri-Cities Fever	L 46-67	---	Allen Event Center

== Standings ==
2011 Lonestar Division
	W	L	T	PCT	PF	PA	DIV	GB	STK
y Allen Wranglers	10	4	0	0.714	664	510	7–2	—	W2
x West Texas Roughnecks	10	4	0	0.714	656	391	6–3	—	W3
Amarillo Venom	4	10	0	0.286	529	522	3–6	6.0	L1
Bricktown Brawlers (Note: Last four games were losses played by replacements teams.)	2	12	0	0.143	292	717	2–7	8.0	L10

== Final roster ==
2011 Allen Wranglers roster
Quarterbacks: 14 Kewan Dewberry; 16 Anthony Fisher; Running backs: 11 Keithon Fleming; Wide receivers: 80 Robert Chase; 24 Jason Jones; 10 Dedrick Poole; 17 Jackie Robinson	Offensive linemen: 62 Prince Hickman; 55 Wondell Rutledge; 91 Mike Ward; Defensive linemen: 21 TaVoris Horton; 9 Fra'Shon McGee	Linebackers: 12 Brett Bowers; 4 James Lancaster; Defensive backs: 13 Wonseleh Brewer; 1 Nick Fellows; 3 Joey Longoria; 15 Frankie Solomon Jr.; Kickers: 6 Garrett Courtney	Injured Reserve: currently vacant; Exempt List: currently vacant; rookies in italics Roster updated July 9, 2011; 19 Active, 0 Inactive → More rosters
