= 2011 Nebraska Danger season =

Indoor Football League team season

- Owner: Charlie Bosselman
- General manager: Mike McCoy
- Head coach: Mike Davis
- Home stadium: Eihusen Arena

Results
- Record: 3-11
- Division place: 4th Great Plains
- Playoffs: did not qualify

The 2011 Nebraska Danger season was the first season for the Nebraska Danger as a professional indoor football franchise and their first in the Indoor Football League (IFL). One of 22 teams competing in the IFL for the 2011 season, the Nebraska Danger were members of the Great Plains Division in the Intense Conference.

The team played their home games under head coach Mike Davis at the Eihusen Arena in Grand Island, Nebraska. The Danger earned a 3–11 record, placing 4th in the Great Plains Division, and failed to qualify for post-season play.

== Schedule ==
Key: Win Tie Loss Bye

=== Preseason ===
Week	Date	Kickoff	Opponent	Results	
Week	Date	Kickoff	Opponent	Final score	Team record
	February 25 (Fri)	7:05pm	Scrimmage	Blue 43–31	---

=== Regular season ===
Week	Date	Kickoff	Opponent	Results	
Week	Date	Kickoff	Opponent	Final score	Team record
1	Bye				
2	March 7 (Mon)	7:05pm	Wichita Wild	W 70–59	1-0
3	Bye				
4	March 21 (Mon)	7:05pm	@Sioux Falls Storm	L 32–80	1-1
5	March 27 (Sun)	4:00pm	Green Bay Blizzard	L 38–48	1-2
6	April 3 (Sun)	3:00pm	@La Crosse Spartans	L 44–50	1-3
7	April 9 (Sat)	7:05pm (9:05 Central)	@Wenatchee Valley Venom	W 84–63	2-3
8	April 16 (Sat)	7:05pm	Allen Wranglers	W 60–37	3-3
9	April 23 (Sat)	7:05pm	@Omaha Beef	L 37–46	3-4
10	April 30 (Sat)	8:05pm	Sioux Falls Storm	L 56–78	3-5
11	May 7 (Sat)	7:05pm	@Allen Wranglers	L 23–49	3-6
12	May 14 (Sat)	7:05pm	Colorado Ice	L 39–47	3-7
13	May 21 (Sat)	7:07pm	@Bloomington Extreme	L 27–45	3-8
14	May 28 (Sat)	7:05pm	Omaha Beef	L 41–75	3-9
15	June 4 (Sat)	7:05pm	@Wichita Wild	L 22–65	3-10
16	June 11 (Sat)	7:05pm	Wyoming Cavalry	L 44–46	3-11

== Roster ==
2011 Nebraska Danger roster
Quarterbacks: 3 Silas Fluellen; 7 Willie Tuitama; 9 Dixie Wooten; Running backs: 20 Tierre Green; Wide receivers: 1 Antuan Bloom; 1 Hurtis Chinn; 10 Ryan Moore; 4 Joe Narin; 20 Richie Ross; 23 Doug Williams	Offensive linemen: 92 Adrian Davis; 76 Darren Marquez; 55 James Poynter; 75 Shawn Santos; Defensive linemen: 44 Darius Davis; 11 Andy Endemann; 91 Eddrick Gilmore; 99 Fred Poole	Linebackers: 24 Walner Leandre; 13 Maurice Mansfield; 34 Trevor Shamblee; Defensive backs: 25 Travarous Bain; 6 Jordan Patton; 21 Darnell Terrell; Kickers: 27 Adrian Trevino	Injured Reserve: currently vacant; Exempt List: currently vacant; Practice squad: currently vacant; Roster updated June 11, 2011; 25 Active, 0 Inactive, 0 PS → More rosters

== Standings ==
2011 Great Plains Division
	W	L	T	PCT	PF	PA	DIV	GB	STK
z Sioux Falls Storm	13	1	0	0.929	1022	457	5–1	—	L1
x Omaha Beef	9	5	0	0.643	615	523	5–1	4.0	W1
Wichita Wild	6	8	0	0.429	571	618	1–5	7.0	W2
Nebraska Danger	3	11	0	0.214	617	788	1–5	10.0	L8
