= 2011 Tri-Cities Fever season =

Indoor Football League team season

- Head coach: Adam Shackleford
- Home stadium: Toyota Center

Results
- Record: 10–4
- Division place: 2nd Pacific
- Conference place: 4th Intense
- Playoffs: Lost United Bowl 10–37 (Storm)

The 2011 Tri-Cities Fever season is the team's seventh season as a professional indoor football franchise and third in the Indoor Football League (IFL). One of twenty-two teams competing in the IFL for the 2011 season, the Kennewick, Washington-based Tri-Cities Fever are members of the Intense Conference.

Under the leadership of head coach Adam Shackleford, the team plays their home games at the Toyota Center in Kennewick, Washington.

The Fever lost to the Sioux Falls Storm 10–37 in the 2011 United Bowl.

== Schedule ==
Key: Win Tie Loss Bye

=== Preseason ===
Week	Date	Kickoff	Opponent	Results	
Week	Date	Kickoff	Opponent	Final Score	Team record
	February 17 (Thu)	6:05pm	Wenatchee Valley Venom	W 53–14	---

=== Regular season ===
Week	Date	Kickoff	Opponent	Results	
Week	Date	Kickoff	Opponent	Final Score	Team record
1	February 26 (Fri)	7:05pm	Arizona Adrenaline	W 76–28	1–0
2	March 5 (Sat)	7:05pm	@Wenatchee Valley Venom	L 52–59	1–1
3	March 12 (Sat)	7:05pm	Fairbanks Grizzlies	W 50–35	2–1
4	Bye				
5	March 25 (Fri)	7:05pm (5:05 Pacific)	@Omaha Beef	W 51–37	3–1
6	Bye				
7	April 10 (Sun)	1:00pm	Kent Predators (later changed name to Seattle Timberwolves)	W 60–42	4–1
8	April 16 (Sat)	7:05pm (6:05 Pacific)	@Arizona Adrenaline	W 90–31	5–1
9	April 23 (Sat)	7:05pm	Colorado Ice	W 48–42	6–1
10	April 30 (Sat)	7:05pm	Seattle Timberwolves	W 63–33	7–1
11	May 7 (Sat)	7:05pm (8:05 Pacific)	@Fairbanks Grizzlies	L 20–58	7–2
12	May 14 (Sat)	7:05pm	Wenatchee Valley Venom	W 80–10	8–2
13	May 20 (Fri)	7:00pm (6:00 Pacific)	@Colorado Ice	L 54–58	8–3
14	May 28 (Sat)	7:05pm	Fairbanks Grizzlies	L 28–31	8–4
15	June 4 (Sat)	7:05pm	@Wenatchee Valley Venom	W 58–52	9–4
16	June 12 (Sun)	7:05pm	@Seattle Timberwolves	W 86–59	10–4
Playoffs
1	June 20 (Mon)	7:00pm	West Texas Roughnecks	W 61–49	---
2	June 27 (Mon)	7:00pm (6:00 Pacific)	@Colorado Ice	W 45–42	---
3	July 9 (Sat)	7:00pm (5:00 Pacific)	@Allen Wranglers	W 67–46	---
4	July 16 (Sat)	7:00pm (5:00 Pacific)	@Sioux Falls Storm	L 10–37	---

== Standings ==
2011 Pacific Division
	W	L	T	PCT	PF	PA	DIV	GB	STK
y Fairbanks Grizzlies	10	4	0	0.714	723	545	6–3	—	W2
x Tri-Cities Fever	10	4	0	0.714	816	575	6–3	—	W2
Seattle Timberwolves	5	9	0	0.357	678	796	4–5	5.0	L2
Wenatchee Valley Venom	3	11	0	0.214	508	845	2–7	7.0	L4

== Roster ==
2011 Tri-Cities Fever roster
Quarterbacks: 5 Houston Lillard; 1 James Thomas; Running backs: 9 Dennis Kennedy; Wide receivers: 23 Jackie Chambers; 7 Joey Hew Len; 33 Justin Jarvis; 4 Steven Whitehead; 8 Oliver Young	Offensive linemen: 96 Carl Barnett; 77 Michael Brown; 76 Jason Donnal; 57 Irvin Stevens; Defensive linemen: 90 Malcolm Bennett; 10 Freddie Harris; 44 Jake Killeen; 40 Christopher Lyles; 34 Brandon Wilson	Linebackers: 3 Joe Thornton; Defensive backs: 12 Dustin Bell; 22 Dwain Crawford; 21 Dennis Rogan; 2 Lionell Singleton; Kickers: 11 Gary Cismesia	Injured Reserve: currently vacant; Exempt List: currently vacant; Practice squad: currently vacant; rookies in italics Roster updated June 19, 2011; 23 Active, 0 Inactive, 0 PS → More rosters
