= Bricktown Brawlers =

Football team

Logo

General information
- Founded: 2010
- Folded: 2011
- Headquartered: Cox Convention Center in Oklahoma City, Oklahoma
- Colors: Brick red, black, white

Personnel
- Owners: Jay Morris; Dale Morris; Jason White
- Head coach: William McCarthy

Team history
- Bricktown Brawlers (2011)

Home fields
- Cox Convention Center (2011)

League / conference affiliations
- Indoor Football League (2011): Intense Conference (2011); Lonestar Division (2011)

The Bricktown Brawlers were a professional indoor football team based in Oklahoma City, Oklahoma. They were a member of the Lonestar Division of the Intense Conference in the Indoor Football League (IFL). The team was founded in 2010 as an expansion member of the IFL. The Brawlers played their home games at Cox Convention Center.

== History ==
On October 25, 2010, it was announced that Jay and Dale Morris had been awarded an expansion franchise in the Indoor Football League. On November 4, 2010, the team announced that Steve Perdue would be their inaugural head coach, as well as a name-the-team contest. On November 22, 2010, it was announced that the franchise would be named the Bricktown Brawlers. On December 16, 2010, the Brawlers announced that former University of Oklahoma quarterback Jason White was added as a co-owner of the team. Assistant coach William McCarthy became the head coach prior to the start of the season.

The Brawlers won their first game on March 13, 2011, with a 29–20 victory over the Amarillo Venom.

After their tenth game of the 2011 season, the Bricktown Brawlers released most of their players and used local semiprofessional teams wearing the Brawlers' uniforms to play the final four games. The Brawlers officially folded at the conclusion of the season and filed for Chapter 7 bankruptcy protection on July 27, 2011.

== Statistics ==
Season	League	Conference	Division	Regular season			Postseason results
Season	League	Conference	Division	Finish	Wins	Losses	Postseason results
2011	IFL	Intense	Lonestar	4th	2	8	Did not qualify

== Personnel ==
=== Coaches ===
- William McCarthy – head coach
- Mike Martinez – assistant
- Jahmal Fenner – assistant
- Lamar Baker – assistant
- Steve Perdue – assistant

=== Final roster ===
Bricktown Brawlers roster
Quarterbacks: 21 Nate Samas; Running backs: 4 Ben Birmingham; Wide receivers: 15 Corey Hall; -- Anthony Harrison; 12 Josh Richey; 10 Poole Travis; 5 Landon Turner	Offensive linemen: 78 Kevin Myers; Defensive linemen: 56 Terrance Hodges; ” 35 Robert Jackson “	Linebackers: vacant; Defensive backs: 1 Quentin Arnett; 16 Carlos Bates; 18 Dennis Havrilla; 6 Richard Meyers; 8 Edward Moore; 3 Kendale Rayford; Kickers: vacant	Injured Reserve: vacant; Exempt List: vacant; Practice squad: vacant; rookies in italics; IFL Transactions updated June 11, 2011; 14 Active, 0 Inactive, 0 PS; → More rosters

== 2011 season ==
2011 Bricktown Brawlers season
- Owner: Jay Morris; Dale Morris; Jason White
- Head coach: William McCarthy
- Home stadium: Cox Convention Center; 1 Myriad Gardens; Oklahoma City, OK 73102

Results
- Record: 2–12
- Division place: 4th Lonestar
- Playoffs: Did not qualify

Week	Date	Opponent	Home/Away	Result	Record
0*	February 21	West Texas Roughnecks	Away	L 22–39	0–1
1	February 28	BYE			
2	March 6	Allen Wranglers	Home	L 36–39	0–2
3	March 13	Amarillo Venom	Home	W 29–20	1–2
4	March 20	West Texas Roughnecks	Home	W 31–27	2–2
5	March 25	Allen Wranglers	Away	L 26–42	2–3
6	April 3	Colorado Ice	Home	L 26–38	2–4
7	April 8	Wyoming Cavalry	Away	L 25–63	2–5
8	April 15	BYE			
9	April 23	Sioux Falls Storm	Home	L 30–84	2–6
10	April 30	BYE			
11	May 7	Wichita Wild	Home	L 14–51	2–7
12	May 14	Amarillo Venom	Away	L 35–50	2–8
13	May 21	Arizona Adrenaline**	Away	L 6–54	2–9
14	May 28	West Texas Roughnecks**	Home	L 6–48	2–10
15	June 6	Amarillo Venom**	Away	L 0–77	2–11
16	June 11	Allen Wranglers**	Away	L 6–85	2–12

* = Kickoff Classic Weekend, before week 1 starts.
** = Played by local semi-pro replacement teams in place of the Brawlers

=== Standings ===
2011 Lonestar Division
	W	L	T	PCT	PF	PA	DIV	GB	STK
y Allen Wranglers	10	4	0	0.714	664	510	7–2	—	W2
x West Texas Roughnecks	10	4	0	0.714	656	391	6–3	—	W3
Amarillo Venom	4	10	0	0.286	529	522	3–6	6.0	L1
Bricktown Brawlers (Note: Last four games were losses played by replacements teams.)	2	12	0	0.143	292	717	2–7	8.0	L10
