= Arizona Adrenaline =

Professional indoor American football team

Logo

General information
- Founded: 2008
- Folded: 2011
- Headquartered: Tim's Toyota Center in Prescott Valley, Arizona
- Colors: Black, blue, silver
- Mascot: Rocket the Roadrunner

Personnel
- Owners: Mitch Simpson; Kurt Dembuagh
- Head coach: Terry Foster
- President: Dart Clark

Team history
- Arizona Adrenaline (2008, 2011)

Home fields
- Tim's Toyota Center (2008, 2011)

League / conference affiliations
- American Indoor Football Association (2008): Western Conference (2008); West Division (2008); Indoor Football League (2011): Intense Conference (2011); Mountain West Division (2011)

The Arizona Adrenaline were a professional indoor American football team based in Prescott Valley, Arizona. They were members of the Mountain West division of the Intense Conference of the Indoor Football League (IFL). The Adrenaline were founded in 2008 as an expansion member of the American Indoor Football Association (AIFA). After two years of dormancy, the Adrenaline returned for 2011 in the IFL. The team played its home games at the Tim's Toyota Center.

== History ==
=== Expansion (2008) ===
In October 2007, it was announced that the American Indoor Football Association (AIFA) was expanding into Prescott Valley, Arizona. After a two-week name the team contest, it was announced that the team's nickname would be the Adrenaline. In December 2007, the Adrenaline announced that Andrew Moore was named the team's head coach.

The Adrenaline opened their first ever season with a 66–21 victory over the New Mexico Wildcats. The following week the Adrenaline received their first loss in franchise history with a 69–30 loss to the Wyoming Cavalry. The Adrenaline were able to clinch a playoff berth in their first season, after a 52–27 victory of the Utah Saints. The Adrenaline finished the regular season 11–3, tying for first place in the West Division of the Western Conference. They faced the Cavalry in the Divisional Playoff game, where they were defeated 51–26.

After a successful first season, the team announced that it was suspending operations for the 2009 season due to lack of sponsorship funding.

=== Rebirth and fall (2011) ===
In October 2010, the Adrenaline announced they would be returning in the spring of 2011 as a member of the Indoor Football League (IFL).

In 2011, Nicole Joy became the first female to score a point in an IFL game.

== Statistics ==
=== Season records ===
League champions	Conference champions	Division champions	Playoff berth	League leader

Season	League	Conference	Division	Regular season				Postseason results
Season	League	Conference	Division	Finish	Wins	Losses	Ties	Postseason results
2008	AIFA	Western	West	2nd	11	3	0	Lost Divisional Playoff (Cavalry) 26–51
2011	IFL	Intense	Mountain West	3rd	1	13	0	Did not qualify
Totals					12	17	0	All-time regular season record (2008, 2011)
Totals					0	1	—	All-time postseason record (2008, 2011)
Totals					12	18	0	All-time regular season and postseason record (2008, 2011)

=== Coaches ===
Name	Term	Regular season				Playoffs		Awards
Name	Term	W	L	T	Win%	W	L	Awards
Andrew Moore	2008, 2011	12	17	0	.414	0	1	

== All-league selections ==
- WR Quincy Jackson
- OL Dorsey Mitchell
- DL Fernandez Shaw
- DB Nick Hannah

== 2011 IFL season ==
2011 Arizona Adrenaline season
- Owner: Mitch Simpson; Kurt Dembuagh
- Head coach: Terry Foster
- Home stadium: Tim's Toyota Center

Results
- Record: 1–13
- Division place: 3rd Mountain West
- Playoffs: Did not qualify

=== Schedule ===
Key: Win Tie Loss Bye

Week	Date	Opponent	Results	
Week	Date	Opponent	Score	Record
1	February 26	@Tri-Cities Fever	L 28–76	0–1
2	Bye			
3	March 13	Colorado Ice	L 26–36	0–2
4	March 20	@Reading Express	L 14–31	0–3
5	March 27	Wyoming Cavalry	L 8–55	0–4
6	April 1	@Wyoming Cavalry	L 30–71	0–5
7	April 8	@Fairbanks Grizzlies	L 32–92	0–6
8	April 16	Tri-Cities Fever	L 31–90	0–7
9	April 22	@Wyoming Cavalry	L 12–53	0–8
10	May 1	@Colorado Ice	L 13–74	0–9
11	May 7	West Texas Roughnecks	L 27–82	0–10
12	Bye			
13	May 21	Bricktown Brawlers (Note: Brawlers were replaced by a local semipro team.)	W 54–6	1–10
14	May 28	Amarillo Venom	L 32–79	1–11
15	June 4	@West Texas Roughnecks	L 6–92	1–12
16	June 10	Colorado Ice	L 12–72	1–13

=== Standings ===
2011 Mountain West Division
	W	L	T	PCT	PF	PA	DIV	GB	STK
z Colorado Ice	11	3	0	0.786	671	492	5–1	—	W1
x Wyoming Cavalry	9	6	0	0.643	677	582	4–2	2.0	L1
Arizona Adrenaline	1	13	0	0.071	326	908	0–6	10.0	L2
