= Wenatchee Valley Venom =

Professional indoor football team

Logo

General information
- Founded: 2009
- Folded: 2011
- Headquartered: Town Toyota Center in Wenatchee, Washington
- Colors: Black, red, silver

Personnel
- Owners: Daryn Klinginsmith; Rob Tidd
- Head coach: Brian Smith
- President: Kyle Skalisky

Team history
- Wenatchee Valley Venom (2010–2011)

Home fields
- Town Toyota Center (2010–2011)

League / conference affiliations
- American Indoor Football Association (2010): West Division (2010); Indoor Football League (2011): Intense Conference (2011); Pacific Division (2011)

The Wenatchee Valley Venom were a professional indoor football team based in Wenatchee, Washington. The team was most recently a member of the Pacific Division of the Intense Conference of the Indoor Football League (IFL). The Venom were founded in 2009 as an expansion member of the American Indoor Football Association (AIFA). The Venom played their home games at Town Toyota Center.

== History ==
On June 15, 2009, co-owner and general manager Mark Helm announced that the Wenatchee Valley Venom would become an expansion team of the American Indoor Football Association (AIFA) for the 2010 season. The ownership named Keith Evans the franchise's first head coach and assistant general manager and Anthony Williams the franchise's first director of marketing and head of player personnel. In January, 2010, the Venom adding Kyle Skalisky to the ownership group and named him team president. After a 2–5 start, the team fired Keith Evans and named defensive coordinator Brian Smith as the team's interim head coach. On May 28, 2010, ownership removed the interim tag from Smith and he took over as the full-time head coach. Smith guided the Venom to a 6–1 record during the remainder of the season, but the team missed the playoffs. The ownership group announced that the team would be returning for the 2011 season, but were unsure what league the franchise would play in.

On September 11, 2010, the Venom joined the Indoor Football League (IFL) for the 2011 season. The Venom won their IFL debut 45–37 over the Fairbanks Grizzlies. The Venom started 2–0, but followed with a seven-game losing streak. Recently added rookie quarterback Charles Dowdell ended the Venom's losing streak by leading them to a 41–36 victory over the Wyoming Cavalry. The Venom then lost the final four games of the season.

On June 21, 2011 The Venom announced they had ceased operations citing low ticket sales since their debut season in 2010 despite the 8–6 season. Though they moved to the more financially stable IFL for the 2011 season, the team posted a 3–11 record and continued to have issues drawing fans.

== Season-by-season results ==
League champions	Conference champions	Division champions	Playoff berth	League leader

Season	League	Conference	Division	Regular season				Postseason results
Season	League	Conference	Division	Finish	Wins	Losses	Ties	Postseason results
2010	AIFA		Western	3rd	8	6	0	Did not qualify
2011	IFL	Intense	Pacific	4th	3	11	0	Did not qualify
Totals					11	17	0	

== Personnel ==
=== All-IFL players ===
The following Venom players were named to All-IFL teams:

- WR Timothy Simmons (1)

=== Head coaches ===
Name	Term	Regular season				Playoffs		Awards
Name	Term	W	L	T	Win%	W	L	Awards
Keith Evans	2010	2	5	0	.286	0	0	
Brian Smith	2010–2011	9	12	0	.429	0	0	

== 2011 season ==
2011 Wenatchee Valley Venom season
- Owner: Daryn Klinginsmith; Rob Tidd
- Head coach: Brian Smith
- Home stadium: Town Toyota Center; 1300 Walla Walla Avenue; Wenatchee, WA 98802

Results
- Record: 3–11
- Division place: 4th Pacific
- Playoffs: Did not qualify

=== Preseason ===
Week	Date	Opponent	Results	
Week	Date	Opponent	Score	Record
	February 17	@Tri-Cities Fever	L 14–53	—

=== Regular season ===
Week	Date	Opponent	Results	
Week	Date	Opponent	Score	Record
1	February 27	@Fairbanks Grizzlies	W 45–37	1–0
2	March 5	Tri-Cities Fever	W 59–52	2–0
3	March 14	@Sioux Falls Storm	L 19–80	2–1
4	March 19	@Colorado Ice	L 24–52	2–2
5	March 26	Fairbanks Grizzlies	L 43–50	2–3
6	Bye			
7	April 9	Nebraska Danger	L 63–84	2–4
8	April 17	@Seattle Timberwolves	L 12–51	2–5
9	April 22	Green Bay Blizzard	L 6–60	2–6
10	April 29	@Fairbanks Grizzlies	L 33–78	2–7
11	May 7	Wyoming Cavalry	W 41–36	3–7
12	May 14	@Tri-Cities Fever	L 10–80	3–8
13	May 21	Seattle Timberwolves	L 56–66	3–9
14	May 27	@Seattle Timberwolves	L 45–61	3–10
15	June 4	Tri-Cities Fever	L 52–58	3–11
16	Bye			

=== Standings ===
2011 Pacific Division
	W	L	T	PCT	PF	PA	DIV	GB	STK
y Fairbanks Grizzlies	10	4	0	0.714	723	545	6–3	—	W2
x Tri-Cities Fever	10	4	0	0.714	816	575	6–3	—	W2
Seattle Timberwolves	5	9	0	0.357	678	796	4–5	5.0	L2
Wenatchee Valley Venom	3	11	0	0.214	508	845	2–7	7.0	L4
