= 2011 Seattle Timberwolves season =

Indoor Football League team season

- Owner: Tom Dowling
- General manager: Mike Berry
- Head coach: Sean Ponder (interim); Keith Evans (fired April 12th; 1-5 record)
- Home stadium: ShoWare Center; 625 West James Street; Kent, WA 98032

Results
- Record: 5-9
- Division place: 3rd Pacific
- Playoffs: did not qualify

The 2011 Kent Predators/Seattle Timberwolves season was the team's second season as a professional indoor football franchise and second in the Indoor Football League (IFL). One of twenty-two teams competing in the IFL for the 2011 season, the Kent, Washington-based Seattle Predators were members of the Pacific Division of the Intense Conference.

Under the leadership of owner, Tom Dowling, general manager Mike Berry and head coach Sean Ponder, the team played their home games at the ShoWare Center in Kent, Washington.

On January 10, 2011, the Kent Predators were sold to Jeffery Scott, who hired new head coach Keith Evans, just two days later. On April 13, the team was sold again, this time to Tom Dowling, changed the team's name to the Seattle Timberwovles while naming Mike Berry the team general manager, and Sean Ponder the team's new head coach.

== Schedule ==
Key: Win Tie Loss Bye

Week	Date	Kickoff	Opponent	Results	
Week	Date	Kickoff	Opponent	Final score	Team record
1	February 25 (Fri)	7:05pm	Sioux Falls Storm	L 71-105	0-1
2	March 6 (Sun)	3:05pm	Fairbanks Grizzlies	W 56-41	1-1
3	Bye				
4	March 17 (Thu)	7:00pm (5:00 Pacific)	@La Crosse Spartans	L 28-66	1-2
5	March 25 (Fri)	7:35pm (5:35 Pacific)	@Chicago Slaughter	L 36-37	1-3
6	April 1 (Fri)	7:05pm	Fairbanks Grizzlies	L 30-31	1-4
7	April 10 (Sun)	1:00pm	@Tri-Cities Fever	L 42-60	1-5
8	April 16 (Sat)	7:05pm	Wenatchee Valley Venom	W 51-12	2-5
9	Bye				
10	April 30 (Sat)	7:05pm	@Tri-Cities Fever	L 33-63	2-6
11	May 6 (Fri)	7:05pm	Omaha Beef	W 52-50	3-6
12	May 14 (Sat)	7:05pm (6:05 Pacific)	@Wyoming Cavalry	L 39-59	3-7
13	May 21 (Sat)	7:05pm	@Wenatchee Valley Venom	W 66-56	4-7
14	May 27 (Fri)	7:05pm	Wenatchee Valley Venom	W 61-45	5-7
15	June 3 (Fri)	7:05pm (8:05 Pacific)	@Fairbanks Grizzlies	L 54-85	5-8
16	June 12 (Sun)	7:05pm	Tri-Cities Fever	L 59-86	5-9

== Standings ==
2011 Pacific Division
	W	L	T	PCT	PF	PA	DIV	GB	STK
y Fairbanks Grizzlies	10	4	0	0.714	723	545	6–3	—	W2
x Tri-Cities Fever	10	4	0	0.714	816	575	6–3	—	W2
Seattle Timberwolves	5	9	0	0.357	678	796	4–5	5.0	L2
Wenatchee Valley Venom	3	11	0	0.214	508	845	2–7	7.0	L4

== Roster ==
2011 Seattle Timberwolves roster
Quarterbacks: 1 Charles McCullum; 7 Kevin Warner; Running backs: 29 Marell Booker; 4 Jarvis Dunn; 3 D. D. Holyfield; Wide receivers: 5 Michael Bush; 15 Andre Piper-Jordan; 9 Travis Poole; 2 Maurice Young	Offensive linemen: 68 Frank Connell; 68 Vaughn Lesuma; Defensive linemen: 99 Fevaei Ahmu; 44 Faleaoga Faumui; 51 Chuck Jones	Linebackers: 45 Drew Coplin; 32 Greg Trent; 29 Eric Pederson; Defensive backs: 13 Jeremiah Captain; 8 Daniel Griggs; 18 Xavier Hicks; 21 Alonzo McCord; Kickers: 22 Dan Kleckner	Injured Reserve: 9 Aaron Striten WR (IR); Exempt List: currently vacant; rookies in italics Roster updated June 12, 2011; 22 Active, 1 Inactive → More rosters
