= 2025 Fishers Freight season =

Inaugural season for the Fishers Freight

- Owner: Jim Hallett
- General manager: Dixie Wooten
- Head coach: Dixie Wooten
- Home stadium: Fishers Event Center

Results
- Record: 4–9
- Conference place: 6th Eastern

The 2025 season was the Fishers Freight's inaugural season in the Indoor Football League (IFL) and the first IFL season for the state of Indiana. The team is led by general manager and head coach Dixie Wooten.

== Founding ==
On October 24, 2023, the Indoor Football League (IFL) announced an expansion team, tentatively known as "Indy Indoor Football", that would play at the brand-new Fishers Event Center and begin play in 2025. On December 15, the team was named the Fishers Freight.

== Staff ==
2025 Fishers Freight staff
Front office: Owner – Jim Hallett; President/CEO – Larry McQueary; General manager – Dixie Wooten; Vice president of operations – Matthew Louck; Head coaches: Head coach – Dixie Wooten; Assistant head coach – Chuck Miller; Offensive coaches: Offensive coordinator/offensive line – Dixie Wooten III	Defensive coaches: Defensive coordinator – Chuck Miller; Defensive backs – Kiante Northington; Special teams coaches: Special teams coordinator – Kiante Northington; Strength and conditioning: Head strength and conditioning – Bob Buckland; Head athletic trainer – Madison Sikyta; → Coaching staff → Front office

== Roster ==
2025 Fishers Freight roster
Quarterbacks (QB): – Keegan Shoemaker; – Jiya Wright; Running backs (RB): – John Gay; – Jon Lewis; – Morian Walker; Wide receivers (WR): – Jaelin Carter; – Isiah Cox; – Jordan Kress; – Jeremy Singleton; 1 J. T. Stokes; 2 Julian Walker; – Jordan Williams-Lambert; Tight ends (TE): None	Offensive linemen (OL): – Johari Branch; – Kaleb Brewer; – Jeremy Cooper; – AJ Forbes; – David Munoz; – LaQuinston Sharp; – Geor’Terrius Spivey; Defensive linemen (DL): – Tamar Heart; – Robert Horsey; 0 Krystapher Oakley; – Kwame Sutton; – Jaylin Swan; – Brayden Utley	Linebackers (LB): – Trajan Stephens-McQueen; Defensive backs (DB): – Kareem Gaulden; – Devin Hafford; – AJ Felton; – Aaron Jackson; – Chris Jefferson; – Tyrell Pearson; – Jaiden Roe; – Shawn Steele II; – Greg Thomas Jr.; Special teams (ST): – Michael Baloga	Rookies in italics 30 active

== Regular season ==
=== Schedule ===
Week	Date	Opponent	Result	Record	Venue	Recap
1	Bye					
2	March 29	at Northern Arizona Wranglers	**W** 41–29	1–0	Findlay Toyota Center	Recap
3	April 4	**Tulsa Oilers**	**W** 40–29	2–0	Fishers Event Center	Recap
4	April 12	at **Massachusetts Pirates**	**L** 47–50	2–1	Tsongas Center	Recap
5	April 19	Bay Area Panthers	**L** 41–57	2–2	Fishers Event Center	Recap
6	April 26	at **Iowa Barnstormers**	**L** 37–68	2–3	Wells Fargo Arena (Note: Wells Fargo Arena was renamed Casey's Center on July 1, 2025.)	Recap
7	May 3	**Quad City Steamwheelers**	**L** OT 48–55	2–4	Fishers Event Center	Recap
8	Bye					
9	May 17	at **Jacksonville Sharks**	**L** 27–59	2–5	VyStar Veterans Memorial Arena	Recap
10	May 24	**Jacksonville Sharks**	**L** 40–46	2–6	Fishers Event Center	Recap
11	May 30	at **Green Bay Blizzard**	**L** 39–55	2–7	Resch Center	Recap
12	June 7	**Massachusetts Pirates**	**L** 23–40	2–8	Fishers Event Center	Recap
13	June 14	at **Quad City Steamwheelers**	**L** 28–45	2–9	Vibrant Arena at The MARK	Recap
14	June 21	**Green Bay Blizzard**	**W** 57–56	3–9	Fishers Event Center	Recap
15	June 28	at **Tulsa Oilers**	**W** 33–7	4–9	BOK Center	Recap
16	Bye					
17	July 12	at **Iowa Barnstormers**	**W** 58–50	5–9	Casey's Center	Recap
18	July 19	San Diego Strike Force	**W** 49–40	6–9	Fishers Event Center	Recap
19	July 25	**Iowa Barnstormers**	**W** 81–40	7–9	Fishers Event Center	Recap
Notes: * Intra-conference opponents are in **bold** text. Legend: – Light green background indicates a victory. – Light red background indicates a loss.

=== Game summaries ===
==== Week 2: at Northern Arizona Wranglers ====
Week 2: Fishers Freight at Northern Arizona Wranglers – Game summary

Quarter	1	2	3	4	Total
**Freight**	0	13	20	8	**41**
Wranglers	7	14	0	8	**29**

at Findlay Toyota Center, Prescott Valley, Arizona

- Date: March 29, 2025
- Game time: 9:05 p.m. EST
- Game weather: None (indoor arena)
- TV announcers (IFL Network): James Poovey (play-by-play), Brecken Poovey (analyst)

Game information

First quarter
Second quarter
Third quarter
Fourth quarter

Passing

- FF – Jiya Wright – 4/9, 47 yards
- NAZ – C. J. Fowler – 14/26, 113 yards, TD, 2 INT

Rushing

- FF – Jiya Wright – 18 attempts, 127 yards, 2 TD
- NAZ – C. J. Fowler – 7 attempts, 55 yards, 2 TD

Receiving

- FF – J. T. Stokes – 1 reception, 24 yards
- NAZ – Marvin Kinsey – 3 receptions, 42 yards

==== Week 3: vs. Tulsa Oilers ====
Week 3: Tulsa Oilers at Fishers Freight – Game summary

Quarter	1	2	3	4	Total
Oilers	0	7	7	15	**29**
**Freight**	14	12	7	7	**40**

at Fishers Event Center, Fishers, Indiana

- Date: April 4, 2025
- Game time: 7:05 p.m. EST
- Game weather: None (indoor arena)
- TV announcers (IFL Network): Andrew Smith (play-by-play), Jim Leisure (analyst), Eva Hallman (sideline reporter)

Game information

First quarter
Second quarter
Third quarter
Fourth quarter

Passing

- TUL – T. J. Edwards – 11/18, 84 yards, 2 TD
- FF – Jiya Wright – 16/23, 127 yards, 2 TD

Rushing

- TUL – T. J. Edwards – 10 attempts, 53 yards, TD
- FF – Jiya Wright – 16 attempts, 54 yards, 3 TD

Receiving

- TUL – Phazione McClurge – 5 receptions, 40 yards, 2 TD
- FF – Shavarez Smith – 7 receptions, 58 yards, TD

==== Week 4: at Massachusetts Pirates ====
Week 4: Fishers Freight at Massachusetts Pirates – Game summary

Quarter	1	2	3	4	Total
Freight	13	12	6	16	**47**
**Pirates**	14	19	7	10	**50**

at Tsongas Center, Lowell, Massachusetts

- Date: April 12, 2025
- Game time: 7:05 p.m. EST
- Game weather: None (indoor arena)
- TV: IFL Network

Game information

First quarter
Second quarter
Third quarter
Fourth quarter

Passing

- FF – Jiya Wright – 10/14, 65 yards, TD, INT
- MAS – Kenji Bahar – 15/22, 179 yards, 3 TD, INT

Rushing

- FF – Jiya Wright – 7 attempts, 52 yards, 2 TD
- MAS – Pooka Williams Jr. – 13 attempts, 37 yards

Receiving

- FF – J. T. Stokes – 6 receptions, 71 yards, TD
- MAS – Thomas Owens – 4 receptions, 58 yards, TD

==== Week 5: vs. Bay Area Panthers ====
Week 5: Bay Area Panthers at Fishers Freight – Game summary

Quarter	1	2	3	4	Total
Panthers	0	0	0	0	**0**
Freight	0	0	0	0	**0**

at Fishers Event Center, Fishers, Indiana

- Date: April 12, 2025
- Game time: 7:05 p.m. EST
- Game weather: None (indoor arena)
- TV: IFL Network

Game information

First quarter
Second quarter
Third quarter
Fourth quarter

Passing

- BAP –
- FF –

Rushing

- BAP –
- FF –

Receiving

- BAP –
- FF –

=== Standings ===
Eastern Conference
	W	L	PCT	CONF
Quad City Steamwheelers	11	5	.688	10–5
Green Bay Blizzard	10	6	.625	10–4
Tulsa Oilers	10	6	.625	6–4
Jacksonville Sharks	10	6	.625	6–5
Massachusetts Pirates	7	9	.438	7–6
Fishers Freight	7	9	.438	4–7
Iowa Barnstormers	1	15	.063	1–13
