= 2025 Arizona Rattlers season =

- Owner: Ron Shurts
- General manager: Jeff Jarnigan
- Head coach: Kevin Guy
- Home stadium: Desert Diamond Arena

Results
- Record: 8–5
- Conference place: T-3rd in Western

The 2025 season was the Arizona Rattlers' eighth in the Indoor Football League (IFL), their 32nd overall, and their 16th under head coach Kevin Guy.

== Staff ==
2025 Arizona Rattlers staff
Front office: Majority owner/CEO – Ron Shurts; President – Kevin Guy; General manager – Jeff Jarnigan; Team operations – Maurice Brown; Director for football operations – Peyton Riggs; Head coaches: Head coach – Kevin Guy; Offensive coaches: Offensive coordinator – Peyton Riggs; Running backs – Dante Moses; Offensive line – Kevin Ashak	Defensive coaches: Defensive line – Jeff Jarnigan; Special teams coaches: Special teams coordinator – Jeff Jarnigan; Strength and conditioning: Head strength and conditioning – Maurice Brown; → Coaching staff → Front office → Ownership

== Roster ==
2025 Arizona Rattlers roster
Quarterbacks (QB): 10 Tripp Harrington; 1 Drew Powell; 11 Dalton Sneed; Running backs (RB): 29 Ron Brown Jr.; Wide receivers (WR): 7 Isaiah Huston; 2 Jamal Miles; 9 Corey Reed Jr.; 6 Yo'Heinz Tyler; Tight ends (TE): None	Offensive linemen (OL): 69 Que Baker-McCaulay; 79 Kordell Brewster; 57 Michael Brown; 78 Kristopher Stroughter; Defensive linemen (DL): 92 Isaiah Coe; 97 James Nyamwaya; 27 Kevin Simes Jr.; 91 Rashawn Yates	Linebackers (LB): 53 Jalen Campbell; 52 Va Lealaimatafao; Defensive backs (DB): 24 Omari Alexander; 28 Ethan Caselberry; 21 Rashie Hodge; 22 Isaiah Huff; 8 Davontae Merriweather; 15 Deontae Overstreet; Special teams (ST): 4 Dawson Evitts K	Reserve: 99 Jaylon Bass DL (IR); -- Michael Boykin DL (DNR); 3 Shannon Brooks RB (PUP); 17 Trey Dixon WR (IR); 78 Isame Faciane OL (IR); 9 Trae'varis Ferrell LB (IR); -- Shaun Lewis DB (Susp.); -- Juan Lua DB (Susp.); 13 Jaiave Magalei QB (IR); 53 Chris Martinez OL (IR); 62 Noel Ofori-Nyadu OL (IR); -- Deiyantei Powell-Woods OL (Left squad); -- Kameren Stewart OL (DNR); 12 Darren Wilson WR (IR); Rookies in italics 25 active (5 exempt), 11 reserve

== Regular season ==
=== Schedule ===
The IFL schedule was announced on October 31, 2024.

Week	Date	Opponent	Result	Record	Venue	Recap
1	Bye					
2	March 30	**Tucson Sugar Skulls**	**W** 56–28	1–0	Desert Diamond Arena	Recap
3	April 6	at Green Bay Blizzard	**W** 51–47	2–0	Resch Center	Recap
4	April 12	**San Antonio Gunslingers**	**W** 63–55	3–0	Desert Diamond Arena	Recap
5	Bye					
6	April 26	**Northern Arizona Wranglers**	**W** 49–20	4–0	Desert Diamond Arena	Recap
7	May 3	at **Tucson Sugar Skulls**	**L** 35–42	4–1	Tucson Arena	Recap
8	May 10	**Bay Area Panthers**	**W** 53–48	5–1	Desert Diamond Arena	Recap
9	May 17	**Vegas Knight Hawks**	**W** 50–47	6–1	Desert Diamond Arena	Recap
10	May 24	at **Northern Arizona Wranglers**	**W** 54–47	7–1	Findlay Toyota Center	Recap
11	May 31	at **Vegas Knight Hawks**	**L** 37–52	7–2	Lee's Family Forum	Recap
12	June 7	at Jacksonville Sharks	**L** 48–54	7–3	VyStar Veterans Memorial Arena	Recap
13	June 14	**Tucson Sugar Skulls**	**L** 47–50 (3OT)	7–4	Desert Diamond Arena	Recap
14	June 22	at **Bay Area Panthers**	**L** 24–37	7–5	SAP Center	
15	June 28	Green Bay Blizzard	**W**48–28	8–5	Desert Diamond Arena	Recap
16	Bye					
17	July 12	**San Diego Strike Force**	**W**46–43	9–5	Desert Diamond Arena	Recap
18	July 19	at **San Antonio Gunslingers**	**W** 41–39	10–5	Freeman Coliseum	Recap
19	July 27	at **San Diego Strike Force**	**L** 26–46	10–6	Frontwave Arena	Recap
Notes: * Intra-conference opponents are in **bold** text. Legend: – Light green background indicates a victory. – Light red background indicates a loss.

=== Game summaries ===
==== Week 2: vs. Tucson Sugar Skulls ====
Week 2: Tucson Sugar Skulls at Arizona Rattlers – Game summary

Quarter	1	2	3	4	Total
Sugar Skulls	0	0	0	0	**0**
Rattlers	0	0	0	0	**0**

at Desert Diamond Arena, Glendale, Arizona

- Date: March 30, 2025
- Game time: 3:05 p.m. MST
- Game weather: None (indoor arena)
- TV: IFL Network

Game information

**First quarter**

**Second quarter**

**Third quarter**

**Fourth quarter**

**Top passers**

- TUC –
- ARI –

**Top rushers**

- TUC –
- ARI –

**Top receivers**

- TUC –
- ARI –

=== Standings ===
Western Conference
	W	L	PCT	CONF
Bay Area Panthers	13	3	.813	10–3
Vegas Knight Hawks	10	6	.625	8–5
San Diego Strike Force (Note: San Diego holds the tiebreaker over Arizona by conference record.)	10	6	.625	10–5
Arizona Rattlers	10	6	.625	8–5
Tucson Sugar Skulls	6	10	.375	5–9
San Antonio Gunslingers	5	11	.313	4–6
Northern Arizona Wranglers	2	14	.125	1–13

== Playoffs ==
=== Schedule ===
Week	Date	Opponent	Result	Venue	Recap
First Round	August 4	San Diego Strike Force	L 48–49	Desert Diamond Arena	Recap
Legend: – Light green background indicates a victory. – Light red background indicates a loss.
