= List of IFL seasons =

The Indoor Football League (IFL) is an indoor American football league in the United States and the oldest active professional indoor football league in North America. It was formed in 2008 when the Intense Football League and United Indoor Football merged after the champions of both leagues faced off in the 2008 National Indoor Bowl Championship.

Originally the teams were split into the Intense Conference and the United Conference with the champions facing in the United Bowl. In 2018, the league lost four of its ten teams, leading to the dissolution of the conferences. The top four teams made the IFL playoffs in 2018, the top six made it in 2019, and the top eight made it in 2021. Before the 2022 season, the United Bowl was rebranded to the IFL National Championship and the Eastern Conference and the Western Conference were founded. Since then the conference champions have met in the IFL National Championship.

== 2009–2017: Intense vs. United ==
Season	No. of teams	Regular season			Playoffs			United Bowl		Ref.
Season	No. of teams	No. of games	Intense Conference top seed	United Conference top seed	Postseason	Intense Conference champion	United Conference champion	Game	Champion	Ref.
2009	19	14	Billings Outlaws	Omaha Beef	2009	Billings Outlaws	RiverCity Rage	2009	Billings Outlaws	
2010	25	14	Billings Outlaws	Richmond Revolution	2010	Billings Outlaws	Sioux Falls Storm	2010	Billings Outlaws	
2011	22	14	Colorado Ice	Sioux Falls Storm	2011	Tri-Cities Fever	Sioux Falls Storm	2011	Sioux Falls Storm	
2012	16	14	Tri-Cities Fever	Sioux Falls Storm	2012	Tri-Cities Fever	Sioux Falls Storm	2012	Sioux Falls Storm	
2013	9	14	Nebraska Danger	Sioux Falls Storm	2013	Nebraska Danger	Sioux Falls Storm	2013	Sioux Falls Storm	
2014	9	14	Colorado Ice	Sioux Falls Storm	2014	Nebraska Danger	Sioux Falls Storm	2014	Sioux Falls Storm	
2015	10	14	Nebraska Danger	Sioux Falls Storm	2015	Nebraska Danger	Sioux Falls Storm	2015	Sioux Falls Storm	
2016	10	16	Spokane Empire	Sioux Falls Storm	2016	Spokane Empire	Sioux Falls Storm	2016	Sioux Falls Storm	
2017	10	16	Arizona Rattlers	Sioux Falls Storm	2017	Arizona Rattlers	Sioux Falls Storm	2017	Arizona Rattlers	

== 2018–2021: IFL downsize ==
Season	No. of teams	Regular season		Playoffs			United Bowl		Ref.
Season	No. of teams	No. of games	Top seed	Postseason	Higher seed	Lower seed	Game	Champion	Ref.
2018	6	14	Iowa Barnstormers	2018	Iowa Barnstormers	Sioux Falls Storm	2018	Iowa Barnstormers	
2019	10	14	Arizona Rattlers	2019	Arizona Rattlers	Sioux Falls Storm	2019	Sioux Falls Storm	
2020	13	0 (Note: The Quad City Steamwheelers, San Diego Strike Force, Bismarck Bucks, and Cedar Rapids River Kings played one game each before the league shut down due to the COVID-19 pandemic.)	—	2020	—	—	2020	—	
2021	12	14	Arizona Rattlers	2021	Arizona Rattlers	Massachusetts Pirates	2021	Massachusetts Pirates	

== 2022–present: Eastern vs. Western ==
Season	No. of teams	Regular season			Playoffs			IFL National Championship		Ref.
Season	No. of teams	No. of games	Eastern Conference top seed	Western Conference top seed	Postseason	Eastern Conference champion	Western Conference champion	Game	Champion	Ref.
2022	14	16	Frisco Fighters	Arizona Rattlers	2022	Quad City Steamwheelers	Northern Arizona Wranglers	2022	Northern Arizona Wranglers	
2023	14	15	Frisco Fighters	Arizona Rattlers	2023	Sioux Falls Storm	Bay Area Panthers	2023	Bay Area Panthers	
2024	16	16	Green Bay Blizzard	Bay Area Panthers	2024	Massachusetts Pirates	Arizona Rattlers	2024	Arizona Rattlers	
2025	14	16	Quad City Steamwheelers	Bay Area Panthers	2025	Green Bay Blizzard	Vegas Knight Hawks	2025	Vegas Knight Hawks	
