= San Antonio Gunslingers (indoor football) =

American indoor football team

- Current season
Logo

General information
- Founded: 2020
- Headquartered: San Antonio, Texas at Freeman Coliseum
- Colors: Blue, red, white, navy
- Website: sanantoniogunslingers.com

Personnel
- Owners: Don Rackler, James Steubing, Randy Carroll
- Head coach: Jonathan Bane
- President: James Steubing

Nicknames
- "The Gunslingers" and "The Slingers"

Team history
- San Antonio Gunslingers (2020–present)

Home fields
- San Antonio Rose Palace (2021); Freeman Coliseum (2022–present)

League / conference affiliations
- American Arena League (2021); West Division (2021); National Arena League (2022–2023); Indoor Football League (2024–present); Western Conference (2024–present)

Playoff appearances (1)
- NAL: 2023

The San Antonio Gunslingers are a professional indoor football team based in San Antonio, Texas, that competes in the Indoor Football League (IFL). The team plays its home games at Freeman Coliseum. They share their name with the original USFL's team of the same name that played from 1984 to 1985.

== History ==
=== American Arena League (2021) ===
The San Antonio Gunslingers were established by three local families, the Garcias, Torres and Youngs. After five years of planning, the Gunslingers joined the American Arena League for the inaugural 2021 season as an expansion team playing in the Texas-based West Division. They led the West Division going into the division championship, but lost to the North Texas Bulls 46–28 on June 6, 2021.

=== National Arena League (2022–2023) ===
After a very successful 2021 season, the Garcia, Torres and Young families made the decision to join the National Arena League. Two games into the season the three families announced the sale of the team to Don and Brandon Rackler on June 7, 2022. The team went 4–8 and did not make the playoffs.

=== Indoor Football League (2024) ===
On September 26, 2023, it was announced that the Gunslingers would join the Indoor Football League (IFL) for the 2024 season.

== Schedule ==
=== 2022 NAL ===
Week	Date	Opponent	Result	Record	Venue
1	April 23	Orlando Predators	L 36–44	0–1	Freeman Coliseum
2	April 30	Columbus Lions	L 45–46	0–2	Freeman Coliseum
3	Bye				
4	Bye				
5	May 20	at Carolina Cobras	L 35–72	0–3	Greensboro Coliseum Complex
6	May 28	at Orlando Predators	L 52–63	0–4	Amway Center
7	June 3	at Jacksonville Sharks	L 67–72	0–5	VyStar Veterans Memorial Arena
8	June 11	Albany Empire	W 59–56	1–5	Freeman Coliseum
9	June 17	at Orlando Predators	W 55–53	2–5	Veterans Stadium
10	June 25	Carolina Cobras	W 61–60(OT)	3–5	Freeman Coliseum
11	July 2	Albany Empire	L 47–62	3–6	Freeman Coliseum
12	July 8	at Columbus Lions	L 75–79	3–7	Columbus Civic Center
13	July 16	Jacksonville Sharks	W 60–52	4–7	Freeman Coliseum
14	July 23	at Albany Empire	L 55–61	4–8	MVP Arena

=== 2023 NAL Regular Season ===
Week	Date	Opponent	Result	Record	Venue
1	April 8	Carolina Cobras	W 41–40	1–0	Freeman Coliseum
2	April 15	Jacksonville Sharks	W 63–62	2–0	VyStar Veterans Memorial Arena
3	April 22	at Albany Empire	W 55–53	3–0	MVP Arena
4	Bye				
5	May 7	at Fayetteville Mustanges	W 40–27	4–0	Crown Coliseum
6	Bye				
7	May 20	at West Texas Warbirds	W 38–36	5–0	Ector County Coliseum
8	May 28	Jacksonville Sharks	L 43–70	5–1	Freeman Coliseum
9	June 4	at Orlando Predators	W 44–33	6–1	Freeman Coliseum
10	Bye				
11	June 17	West Texas Warbirds	W 55–49	7–1	Freeman Coliseum
12	June 24	West Texas Warbirds	W 69–55	8–1	Freeman Coliseum
13	July 1	Orlando Predators	L 33–52	8–2	Amway Center
14	Bye				
15	July 15	at Carolina Cobras	L 43–66	8–3	Greensboro Coliseum Complex
16	July 22	Carolina Cobras	L 45–63	8–4	Freeman Coliseum

=== 2023 NAL Regular Playoff ===
Round	Date	Opponent	Result	Venue
Semifinal	August 5	Carolina Cobras	L 36–52	Greensboro Coliseum Complex

=== 2024 IFL Regular Season ===
Week	Date	Opponent	Result	Record	Venue
1	Bye				
2	Bye				
3	April 1	at San Diego Strike Force	L 61–69	0–1	Pechanga Arena
4	April 6	Northern Arizona Wranglers	L 50–57	0–2	Freeman Coliseum
5	April 12	at Vegas Knight Hawks	L 44–66	0–3	Lee's Family Forum
6	April 18	Tucson Sugar Skulls	W 60–36	1–3	Freeman Coliseum
7	April 26	at Frisco Fighters	W 54–52	2–3	Comerica Center
8	May 4	Frisco Fighters	L 57–62	2–4	Freeman Coliseum
9	May 11	at Duke City Gladiators	W 56–53	3–4	Rio Rancho Events Center
10	May 18	Tulsa Oilers	W 54–43	4–4	Freeman Coliseum
11	May 25	at Bay Area Panthers	L 31–42	4–5	SAP Center
12	Bye				
13	June 8	Duke City Gladiators	W 46–45	5–5	Freeman Coliseum
14	June 15	at Massachusetts Pirates	W 52–51	6–5	Tsongas Center
15	June 23	at Northern Arizona Wranglers	L 68–74	6–6	Findlay Toyota Center
16	June 29	Frisco FIghters	L 57–58	6–7	Freeman Coliseum
17	July 6	Massachusetts Pirates	W 58–55	7–7	Freeman Coliseum
18	July 13	at Tucson Sugar Skulls	W 49–43	8–7	Tucson Arena
19	July 20	Arizona Rattlers	L 34–41	8–8	Freeman Coliseum

== Season-by-season results ==
League champions	Conference champions	Playoff berth	League leader

Season	Team	League	Conference	Regular season			Postseason results
Season	Team	League	Conference	Finish	Wins	Losses	Postseason results
2021		AAL		2nd	5	2	
2022		NAL		5th	4	8	
2023		NAL		3rd	8	4	Lost first round (Carolina) 52–36
2024	2024	IFL	Western	6th	8	8	
2025	2025	IFL	Western	6th	5	11	
2026	2026	IFL	Western	5th	5	11	
Totals					35	44	All-time regular season record (2021–2026)
Totals					0	1	All-time postseason record (2021–2026)
Totals					35	45	All-time regular season and postseason record (2021–2026)

== Notable players ==
See Category:San Antonio Gunslingers (indoor football) players
