= Eastern Conference (IFL) =

- League: Indoor Football League
- Sport: Indoor football
- Founded: 2022
- No. of teams: 9
- Most recent champion: Green Bay Blizzard (2nd title)
- Most titles: Green Bay Blizzard (2 titles)

The Eastern Conference (EC) is a conference of the Indoor Football League (IFL), the highest level of professional indoor football in the United States. The Eastern Conference and its counterpart, the Western Conference, each have seven teams and were created as part of the 2022 IFL expansion.

== Teams ==
=== Active teams ===
Team	Location	Arena	Joined
Arkansas Diamonds	Little Rock, Arkansas	Barton Coliseum	2027
Athens Crush	Athens, Georgia	Akins Ford Arena	2027
Fishers Freight	Fishers, Indiana	Fishers Event Center	2025
Green Bay Blizzard	Ashwaubenon, Wisconsin	Resch Center	2022
Iowa Barnstormers	Des Moines, Iowa	Casey's Center	2022
Jacksonville Sharks	Jacksonville, Florida	VyStar Veterans Memorial Arena	2024
Orlando Pirates	Orlando, Florida	Kia Center	2022
Quad City Steamwheelers	Moline, Illinois	Vibrant Arena at The MARK	2022
Savannah Leprachauns	Savannah, Georgia	Enmarket Arena	2027

== EC championships ==
Season	Date	Winning team	Score	Losing team	Arena	Location	Ref.
2022	July 29	Quad City Steamwheelers	48–41	Frisco Fighters	Comerica Center	Frisco, Texas	
2023	July 29	Sioux Falls Storm	45–44	Frisco Fighters	Comerica Center	Frisco, Texas	
2024	August 2	Massachusetts Pirates	51–28	Green Bay Blizzard	Resch Center	Green Bay, Wisconsin	
2025	August 9	Green Bay Blizzard	71–64	Quad City Steamwheelers	Vibrant Arena at The MARK	Moline, Illinois	
2026	August 9	Green Bay Blizzard	67-60 (OT)	Tulsa Oilers	Resch Center	Green Bay, Wisconsin	

== Division champions ==
Season	Team	Record	Postseason results
Eastern Conference
2022	Frisco Fighters (1)	14–2	Won Round One (Barnstormers) 64–39; Lost EC Championship (Steamwheelers) 41–48
2023	Frisco Fighters (2)	13–2	Won Round One (Steamwheelers) 57–29; Lost EC Championship (Storm) 44–45
2024	Green Bay Blizzard (1)	13–3	Won Round One (Steamwheelers) 34–23; Lost EC Championship (Pirates) 51–28
2025	Quad City Steamwheelers (1)	11–5	Won Round One (Sharks) 57–41; Lost EC Championship (Blizzard) 64–71
2026	Green Bay Blizzard (2)	13–3	Won Round One (Pirates) 73-59; Won EC Championship (Oilers) 67-60 (OT); Lost IFL National Championship (Rattlers) 51-62

== Wild Card qualifiers ==
Season	Team	Record	Postseason results
Eastern Conference
2022	Massachusetts Pirates	11–5	Lost Round One (Steamwheelers) 38–39
2022	Quad City Steamwheelers	9–7	Won Round One (at Pirates) 39–38; Won EC Championship (at Fighters) 48–41; Lost IFL National Championship (at Wranglers) 45–47
2022	Iowa Barnstormers	9–7	Lost Round One (at Fighters) 14–53
2023	Sioux Falls Storm	9–6	Won Round One (Pirates) 42–39; Won WC Championship (at Fighters) 45–44; Lost IFL National Championship (vs. Panthers) 41–51
2023	Massachusetts Pirates	9–6	Lost Round One (at Storm) 39–42
2023	Quad City Steamwheelers	9–6	Lost Round One (Fighters) 29–57
2024	Frisco Fighters	13–3	Lost Round One (Pirates) 50–53
2024	Massachusetts Pirates	8–8	Won Round One (at Fighters) 53–50; Won WC Championship (at Blizzard) 51–28; Lost IFL National Championship (vs. Rattlers) 16–53
2024	Quad City Steamwheelers	8–8	Lost Round One (at Blizzard) 23–34
2025	Green Bay Blizzard	10–6	Won Round One (Oilers) 58–26; Won WC Championship (at Steamwheelers) 71–64; Lost IFL National Championship (vs. Knight Hawks) 61–64
2025	Tulsa Oilers	10–6	Lost Round One (at Blizzard) 26–58
2025	Jacksonville Sharks	10–6	Lost Round One (at Steamwheelers) 41–57
2026	Jacksonville Sharks	11-5	Lost Round One (at Oilers) 28-31
2026	Tulsa Oilers	11-5	Won Round One (vs Sharks) 31-28; Lost EC Championship (at Blizzard) 60-67 (OT)
2026	Orlando Pirates	10-6	Lost Round One (at Blizzard) 59-37

== Season results ==
Denotes team that won the IFL National Championship
Denotes team that won the EC Championship, but lost the IFL National Championship
Denotes team that qualified for the IFL Playoffs

Season	Team (record)							
Season	1st	2nd	3rd	4th	5th	6th	7th	8th
2022: The Eastern Conference was formed with seven inaugural members: the Bismarck Bucks, Frisco Fighters, Green Bay Blizzard, Iowa Barnstormers, Massachusetts Pirates, Quad City Steamwheelers, and Sioux Falls Storm.
2022	Frisco (14–2)	Massachusetts (11–5)	Quad City (9–7)	Iowa (9–7)	Sioux Falls (8–8)	Green Bay (7–10)	Bismarck (3–13)	—N/a
2023: An expansion team, the Tulsa Oilers, joined the Eastern Conference while the Bucks suspended operations.
2023	Frisco (13–2)	Sioux Falls (9–6)	Massachusetts (9–6)	Quad City (9–6)	Green Bay (7–8)	Iowa (3–12)	Tulsa (2–13)	—N/a
2024: The Jacksonville Sharks joined the conference.
2024	Green Bay (13–3)	Frisco (13–3)	Massachusetts (8–8)	Quad City (8–8)	Tulsa (6–10)	Jacksonville (5–11)	Iowa (5–11)	Sioux Falls (3–13)
2025: The Fishers Freight expansion team joined the conference. The Fighters and Storm went dormant.
2025	Quad City (11–5)	Green Bay (10–6)	Tulsa (10–6)	Jacksonville (10–6)	Massachusetts (7–9)	Fishers (7–9)	Iowa (1–15)	—N/a
2026: The Pirates relocated to Orlando and became the Orlando Pirates.
2026	Green Bay (13-3)	Tulsa (11-5)	Jacksonville (11-5)	Orlando (10-6)	Fishers (8-8)	Quad City (5-11)	Iowa (1-15)	—N/a
2027: Three new expansion teams joined the conference: The Arkansas Diamonds, the Athens Crush, & the Savannah Leprachauns. Tulsa moved to the Western Conference.
