= T. J. Edwards (quarterback) =

Indoor American football quarterback (born 1997)

TJ Edwards II
No. 4 – Tulsa Oilers
- Position: Quarterback
- Roster status: Active

Personal information
- Born: March 19, 1997 (age 29); Dallas, Texas, U.S.
- Listed height: 6 ft 0 in (1.83 m)
- Listed weight: 215 lb (98 kg)

Career information
- High school: Lakeview Centennial (Garland)
- College: Southwest Baptist (2015–2017); Indianapolis (2019)
- NFL draft: 2020: undrafted

Career history
- FCF Beasts (2021); Arizona Rattlers (2021); Frisco Fighters (2022–2023); San Antonio Brahmas (2024)*; Frisco Fighters (2024); Tulsa Oilers (2025–present)
- * Offseason or practice squad member only

Awards and highlights
- IFL Most Valuable Player (2023); 2× First-team All-IFL (2023, 2026); GLVC Offensive Player of the Year (2016); GLVC Freshman of the Year (2015); First-team All-GLVC (2016); Second-team All-GLVC (2017); Third-team All-GLVC (2019)

Career IFL statistics as of 2023
- Passing attempts: 545
- Passing completions: 353
- Completion percentage: 64.8%
- TD–INT: 67–15
- Rushing attempts: 316
- Rushing yards: 1,612
- Rushing touchdowns: 78

TJ Edwards II (born March 19, 1997) is an American football quarterback for the Tulsa Oilers of the Indoor Football League (IFL). He played college football for the Southwest Baptist Bearcats and Indianapolis Greyhounds. Edwards has had great success in indoor football leagues, winning the IFL Most Valuable Player in 2023.

== Early life ==
Edwards was enrolled at Lakeview Centennial High School in Garland, Texas. He committed to play at Southwest Baptist University.

== College career ==
=== Southwest Baptist ===
==== 2015 season ====
Edwards entered the first season with the Bearcats as the starter. In his first game, on September 3, 2015, against #24 Grand Valley State, he threw for 239 yards and two touchdowns as well as rushing for 52 yards and a touchdown in a 36–28 loss. In the second game of the season, against #21 Friends, Edwards rushed for 156 yards and three rushing touchdowns on top of his 121 passing yards and his lone passing touchdown in a 52–0 win. In the final game of the season, against Lincoln, he threw for 279 yards and had six total touchdowns, five in the air while one was on the ground, in a 62–19 win. Edwards finished the season playing in all ten games finishing 146-for-267 through the air with 2,304 yards, and 21 touchdowns to only four interceptions. He also finished the season with 147 rushing attempts for 479 and eight rushing touchdowns. On November 19, Edwards was selected as the Great Lakes Valley Conference Freshman of the Year.

==== 2016 season ====
In the second game of the 2016 season, Edwards was awarded GLVC Offensive Player of the Week for a 360-yard, four-total touchdown performance against Tarleton State. A week later, Edwards and the Bearcats took down the defending GLVC champions in the Indianapolis Greyhounds. During the game, he had 241 passing yards and two touchdowns. After a 37–20 victory over the Quincy Hawks, SBU received the most votes in school history for the AFCA Division II Coaches Poll (37). They also tied a school record for the best starts in school history with a record of 4–0 (1986 & 1987). A week later, Edwards passed for 315 yards and five touchdowns to beat the McKendree Bearcats, 35–7. This win would mark the best start in program history. SBU earned their first NCAA National Ranking in program history when they were ranked #20 by the AFCA Division II Coaches Poll. Edwards was given his second GLVC Offensive Player of the Week Award for his performance.

Against the Saint Joseph's Hawks, Edwards passed for 330 yards and four touchdowns as well as rushing for 96 yards and three more rushing touchdowns. He would earn his third GLVC Offensive Player of the Week Award of the season. On October 29, he would lead the Bearcats to their program-best 8th win of the season against the Missouri S&T Miners. On November 12, Edwards broke the GLVC and the SBU record for single-season passing touchdowns. The same night the Bearcats claimed the GLVC title. On November 17, Edwards was named GLVC Offensive Player of the Year and became the youngest player in GLVC history to win the award. He also earned a First-Team All-GLVC selection.

After finishing the regular season with a 10–1 record, SBU was given a #17 ranking and made the first round of the 2016 NCAA Division II Football Championship postseason in the Super Regional Four. They were slated to play #21 Colorado Mines. Edwards passed for 230 yards and one touchdown in the 63–35 loss against the Miners, finishing the season 10–2. Edwards broke two school records during the 2016 season. His first was passing touchdowns in a season (34) and the second was consecutive games with a passing touchdown (22). On January 20, 2017, Edwards was named to the Don Hansen Third-Team All-Super Region 4 Team.

==== 2017 season ====
The 2017 season would prove to be Edwards' final season with the Bearcats. On November 16, 2017, Edwards threw for 390 yards and three touchdowns. He was named GLVC Offensive Player of the Week for his performance. Edwards finished the season passing for 2,730 yards, 23 touchdowns, five interceptions, and 118 rushing attempts for 280 yards and four touchdowns.

=== Indianapolis ===
==== 2019 season ====
After attending Dallas County Community College and sitting out in 2018, Edwards transferred to the University of Indianapolis for the 2019 season.

In his UIndy debut, Edwards set the GLVC record for career touchdown passes with 80. He also compiled 248 total yards (221 passing, 27 rushing) in their 24–9 victory over Ashland. Against McKendree, Edwards set the conference record for career passing yards (8,903) and total yards (10,461) in their 63–21 blowout win. On October 26, Edwards threw for 158 yards and two touchdowns against Missouri S&T, helping UIndy earn its 23rd consecutive conference victory, which would set a new GLVC record. After starting the season 7–0, the Greyhounds suffered their first loss against Lindenwood, making it their first conference loss since 2016. Against Truman, Edwards surpassed 10,000 passing yards for his career. In their final regular season game against Lake Erie, Edwards threw a screen pass to wide receiver Ryan Topper before Topper threw the ball right back to him. Edwards would then take that pass 58 yards for a touchdown.

=== College statistics ===
| Year | Team | Games | | | Passing | | | | | | | | Rushing | | | |
| Year | Team | GP | GS | Record | Cmp | Att | Pct | Yds | Avg | TD | Int | Rtg | Att | Yds | Avg | TD |
|---|---|---|---|---|---|---|---|---|---|---|---|---|---|---|---|---|
| 2015 | Southwest Baptist | 10 | 10 | 4–6 | 146 | 267 | 54.7 | 2,304 | 8.6 | 21 | 4 | 150.1 | 147 | 479 | 3.3 | 8 |
| 2016 | Southwest Baptist | 12 | 12 | 10–2 | 257 | 403 | 63.8 | 3,242 | 8.1 | 34 | 7 | 155.7 | 154 | 685 | 4.5 | 10 |
| 2017 | Southwest Baptist | 10 | 10 | 5–5 | 225 | 361 | 62.3 | 2,730 | 7.6 | 23 | 5 | 144.1 | 118 | 280 | 2.4 | 4 |
| 2019 | Indianapolis | 11 | 11 | 9–2 | 162 | 261 | 62.1 | 2,392 | 9.2 | 23 | 4 | 165.1 | 79 | 407 | 5.2 | 7 |
| Career | | 43 | 43 | 28–15 | 790 | 1,292 | 61.2 | 10,668 | 8.3 | 101 | 20 | 153.2 | 498 | 1,851 | 3.7 | 29 |

== Professional career ==
=== FCF Beasts ===
During the 2021 offseason, Edwards signed with the Fan Controlled Football League (FCF). During the Week 1 draft, he was selected to the FCF Beasts as their backup to Quinton Flowers. Edwards finished the game against the FCF Zappers with 96 rushing yards and a touchdown. The Beasts again took Edwards, this time with the 12th pick in the Week 2 draft. Edwards was again the QB2 for their Week 2 game against the FCF Wild Aces. He finished the game going 5-for-6 passing with 56 yards, as well as five rushes for 36 yards and the game-winning touchdown. Going into the Week 3 draft, Edwards was franchise-tagged by the Beasts. Edwards had his first interception against the FCF Glacier Boyz. The Beast would win 28–22. In their Week 4 matchup against the Zappers, Edwards finished 5-for-5 with 125 yards and a touchdown through the air, while he had two attempts for 11 yards on the ground. The Beasts would lose their first game and finish the season 3–1. The Beasts were awarded the one-seed for the FCF playoffs and matched up with the Glacier Boyz. The Beasts would fall in the first round and end their season with a 38–20 loss. Edwards finished the season 19-for-29 (65.5%) for 280 yards, and three touchdowns to two interceptions with 197 rushing yards on 16 attempts and three rushing touchdowns.

=== Arizona Rattlers ===
Edwards signed with the Arizona Rattlers of the Indoor Football League (IFL) for the 2021 season. Edwards got his first action against the Northern Arizona Wranglers on July 10, 2021, finishing the game 3-for-3, 39 yards, and two touchdowns. He also rushed for another score. Edwards finished the season playing in only three games going 3-for-7 passing (57.1%) for 41 yards and two touchdowns.

=== Frisco Fighters (first stint) ===
==== 2022 season ====
On January 4, 2022, Edwards signed with the Frisco Fighters of the Indoor Football League (IFL). Edwards sat behind Blake Sims to begin the season, but he got his first start against the Duke City Gladiators. He went 9-for-12 earning 112 yards and a touchdown. He also added ten rushing attempts for 58 yards and three touchdowns. In his second start against the Tulsa Oilers, Edwards had 20 completions for 215 yards and four touchdowns as well as 21 rushing yards and a rushing touchdown.

Edwards finished the regular season with an 8–1 record as the Frisco starter and led them to first place finish in the Eastern Conference. He made his playoff debut against the Quad City Steamwheelers finishing with 226 total yards and seven total touchdowns to win, 57–29. This success would not follow Edwards into his second-round matchup against the Sioux Falls Storm. He finished the game with 131 passing yards, two touchdowns, and three interceptions. Frisco would lose, 45–44. Edwards finished the 2022 season passing for 1,481 yards earning 26 touchdowns and five interceptions as well as 126 rushing attempts for 759 yards and 28 touchdowns.

==== 2023: IFL MVP ====
On September 20, 2022, Edwards re-signed with the Fighters for the 2023 season after finishing 9–1 as a starter the previous year. Edwards earned Week 1 Offensive Player of the Week after he finished with 138 passing yards, 79 rushing yards, and seven total touchdowns (six rushing, one passing) in a 76–30 win over the Green Bay Blizzard. Against the Duke City Gladiators, Edwards again shined in the win with two passing and three rushing touchdowns. A week later, against the Massachusetts Pirates, Edwards had another six touchdown performance, this time with four rushing and two passing, in the 56–39 win. After starting the season 7–0, the Fighters were handed their first lose to the eventual champions in the Bay Area Panthers. During the game, Edwards had 121 yards on the ground, 161 through the air, and seven total touchdowns (five rushing, two passing). Despite his performance, the Panthers won, 62–55. Against the San Diego Strike Force a week later, Edwards had a career-high, eight touchdowns (five rushing, three passing), while also having 191 passing yards. He earned his second Offensive Player of the Week nod of the season for this performance. Edwards then had a four-game streak of 5+ touchdown performances, starting with his 72–58 loss to the Pirates and ending with his 45–38 revenge game against the Panthers.

The Fighters ended the season on a five-game win streak, finishing with a 13–2 record. In their round-one matchup against the Quad City Steamwheelers, Edwards had 183 passing yards, four passing touchdowns, 43 rushing yards, and three rushing touchdowns. The Fighters would move on, winning 57–29. Edwards would face off against the Sioux Falls Storm in the Western Conference Championship. The Fighters would falter with Edwards throwing three picks to six touchdowns (four rushing, two passing). Frisco would fall one point shy in the 55–54 loss, ending their season. Edwards lead the league in completions (225), pass attempts (356), passing yards (2,600), and rushing touchdowns (49). On August 3, Edwards was named the IFL's Most Valuable Player for the 2023 season. He was also a First Team All-IFL selection.

=== San Antonio Brahmas ===
On August 10, 2023, Edwards was claimed by the San Antonio Brahmas of the XFL in the 2024 "rights claim" draft.

=== Frisco Fighters (second stint) ===
On February 8, 2024, Edwards re-signed with the Fighters for the 2024 season.

=== Tulsa Oilers ===
On January 27, 2025, Edwards signed with the Tulsa Oilers for the 2025 season.

== IFL career statistics ==
Legend
| | IFL Most Valuable Player |
| | Led the league (for quarterbacks) |
| **Bold** | Career high |

| Year | Team | Games | | | Passing | | | | | | | | | Rushing | | | | | Sacks | | Fumbles | |
| Year | Team | GP | GS | Record | Cmp | Att | Pct | Yds | Y/A | Lng | TD | Int | Rtg | Att | Yds | Avg | Lng | TD | Sck | SckY | Fum | Lost |
|---|---|---|---|---|---|---|---|---|---|---|---|---|---|---|---|---|---|---|---|---|---|---|
| 2021 | ARI | 3 | 0 | — | 4 | 7 | 57.1 | 41 | **8.2** | 23 | 2 | 0 | **200.6** | 4 | 0 | 0.0 | 2 | 1 | 1 | 13 | 0 | 0 |
| 2022 | FRI | 16 | 10 | 9–1 | 124 | 182 | **68.1** | 1,481 | 8.1 | 44 | 26 | 5 | 178.1 | 126 | 759 | **6.0** | 34 | 28 | 11 | **64** | **6** | 1 |
| 2023 | FRI | **17** | **17** | **14–3** | **225** | **356** | 63.2 | **2,600** | 7.3 | **49** | **39** | **10** | 155.1 | **186** | **853** | 4.6 | 35 | **49** | **12** | 53 | **6** | **4** |
| 2024 | FRI | 14 | 14 | 5–1 | 145 | 218 | 66.5 | 1,669 | 7.7 | 45 | 38 | 4 | 184.7 | 170 | 771 | 4.5 | **45** | 35 | 8 | 43 | 1 | 0 |
| 2025 | TUL | 0 | 0 | 0–0 | 0 | 0 | – | 0 | – | 0 | 0 | 0 | – | 0 | 0 | – | 0 | 0 | 0 | 0 | 0 | 0 |
| Career | | 42 | 33 | 28–5 | 498 | 763 | 65.3 | 5,791 | 7.6 | 49 | 105 | 19 | 169.5 | 486 | 2,383 | 4.9 | 45 | 113 | 32 | 173 | 13 | 5 |
