= Les Moss (American football) =

American indoor football coach

Bay Area Panthers
- Title: Assistant head coach

Career information
- High school: Poca (WV)
- College: UCF

Career history
- Chicago Bruisers (1988–1989) Assistant; Detroit Drive (1990) Assistant; Orlando Predators (1991–2003) Defensive coordinator; Orlando Rage (2001) Tight ends coach; Wilkes-Barre/Scranton Pioneers (2004–2009) Head coach; Jacksonville Sharks (2010–2016) Head coach; Albany Empire (2018–2019) Assistant head coach; Iowa Barnstormers (2021) Head coach; Northern Arizona Wranglers (2022–2024) Head coach; Bay Area Panthers (2025) Assistant head coach

Awards and highlights
- 5× ArenaBowl champion (1990, 1998, 2000, 2011, 2019); IFL National Champion (2022); af2 Coach of the Year (2004); AFL Coach of the Year (2010); IFL Coach of the Year (2022)

Head coaching record
- Regular season: 70–50 (.583)
- Postseason: 7–4 (.636)
- Career: 77–54 (.588)

Les Moss is an American football coach and current assistant head coach of the Bay Area Panthers in the Indoor Football League (IFL). He was the head coach of the Jacksonville Sharks of the Arena Football League (AFL) from 2010 to 2016 and the assistant head coach of the Albany Empire of the AFL from 2018 to 2019. He was the head coach of the IFL's Iowa Barnstormers for the 2021 season and the head coach of the IFL's Northern Arizona Wranglers from 2022 to 2024. He is the son of former NFL, AFL, CFL and NCAA head football coach Perry Moss, who is enshrined in the AFL Hall of Fame.

== Early life ==
Moss grew up in Lexington, Kentucky, until he was in eighth grade when his family moved to Poca, West Virginia, where he attended Poca High School. He was a member of the football team playing offensive end.

== Professional career ==
Moss was head coach of the Wilkes-Barre/Scranton Pioneers of the af2, where he was Coach of the year. In 2010, Moss was named AFL Coach of the Year after compiling a 12–4 record with the Jacksonville Sharks in their inaugural season. On October 4, 2012, The Sharks announced that Moss had been re-signed through the 2014 season. He was fired by the Sharks on July 18, 2016, after a 5–9 start to the season. He was tight ends coach for the XFL's Orlando Rage.

On November 28, 2017, Moss was named the assistant head coach of the AFL 2018 expansion team, the Albany Empire. He was with the Empire in their 2019 season when they won ArenaBowl XXXII. The entire league ceased operations after that season.

In 2021, he was named the head coach of the Iowa Barnstormers of the Indoor Football League. The Barnstormers finished 6–6 and were eliminated in the first round of the playoffs. Moss was released in September 2021. He was then hired by the IFL's Northern Arizona Wranglers as head coach for the 2022 season. In his first season as head coach, Moss would lead the Wranglers to a remarkable turnaround, a 12–4 record and clinching a playoff berth, just one season after the team went 1–13 in its inaugural season. The Wranglers would go on to win the 2022 IFL National Championship, defeating the Quad City Steamwheelers 47–45.

On September 9, 2024, Moss was named assistant head coach of the Bay Area Panthers.

=== AFL head coaching record ===
Team	Year	Regular season				Postseason			
Team	Year	Won	Lost	Win %	Finish	Won	Lost	Win %	Result
JAX	2010	12	4	.750	1st in AC South	0	1	.000	Lost to Orlando Predators in AC First Round
JAX	2011	14	4	.778	1st in AC South	3	0	1.000	ArenaBowl XXIV Champions
JAX	2012	10	8	.556	1st in AC South	1	1	.500	Lost to Philadelphia Soul in AC Championship
JAX	2013	12	6	.667	1st in AC South	1	1	.500	Lost to Philadelphia Soul in AC Championship
JAX	2014	7	11	.389	3rd in AC South	–	–	–	–
JAX	2015	10	8	.556	2nd in AC South	2	1	.666	Lost to San Jose SaberCats in ArenaBowl XXVIII
JAX	2016	5	9	.357	Fired	–	–	–	–
Total		70	50	.583		7	4	.636	
