= Matt Behrendt =

American football quarterback

Green Bay Blizzard
- Title: Offensive coordinator

Personal information
- Born: Westchester, Illinois
- Listed height: 6 ft 2 in (1.88 m)
- Listed weight: 205 lb (93 kg)

Career information
- High school: Nazareth Academy (La Grange Park, Illinois)
- College: Wisconsin–Whitewater
- NFL draft: 2015: undrafted

Career history

Playing
- Colorado Ice (2015); Green Bay Blizzard (2016–2017); Arizona Rattlers (2019)*; Tucson Sugar Skulls (2019)
- * Offseason or practice squad member only

Coaching
- Green Bay Blizzard (2021–present) Offensive coordinator

Awards and highlights
- 3× Stagg Bowl champion (2011, 2013, 2014); 2× Stagg Bowl Most Outstanding Player Award (2013, 2014); IFL Assistant Coach of the Year (2025, 2026); 3× IFL Player of the Week

Matt Behrendt is an American football coach and former quarterback who is the offensive coordinator for the Green Bay Blizzard of the Indoor Football League (IFL). He played college football at University of Wisconsin–Whitewater. Behrendt was a member of three NCAA Division III Football Championship-winning teams with the Wisconsin–Whitewater Warhawks football program, one as a backup in 2011 and two as the team's starting quarterback, in 2013 and 2014.

== Early life and college career ==
Behrendt grew up in Illinois and attended Nazareth Academy in La Grange Park, Illinois, playing football and basketball for the school and was selected as an all-area athlete. Behrendt attended the University of Wisconsin-Whitewater majoring in physical education while playing for the Wisconsin–Whitewater Warhawks football team from 2011 to 2014. As a freshman in 2011, Behrendt backed up to starting quarterback Matt Blanchard as Wisconsin–Whitewater completed a perfect season and won the NCAA Division III Football Championship

Behrendt took over as the starting quarterback during his final two years at school, leading the Warhawks to consecutive national championships in 2013 and 2014 and winning the Stagg Bowl Most Outstanding Player Award both years. He was named Wisconsin Intercollegiate Athletic Conference (WIAC) Offensive Player of the Year for 2014. Behrendt earned Division III All-American honors while in college.

Behrendt also lays claim to the two longest streaks of consecutive attempts without an interception (388 in 2013–14 and 225 in 2012–13) in school history. Behrendt claimed the records for most completions and touchdown passes in school history prior to his final game with the Warhawks. While at Whitewater, Behrendt was roommates with Jake Kumerow.

== Professional career ==
After going undrafted in 2015, Behrendt was invited to rookie minicamp by the Minnesota Vikings. However, he was not signed to a contract. He also took part in the local pro day held by the Chicago Bears.

=== Colorado Ice ===
Behrendt signed with the Colorado Ice of the Indoor Football League, playing in 3 games near the end of the 2015 Indoor Football League season. His jersey number was 2, the only time Behrendt has not worn number 16. His professional debut was also his first start for the Ice against the Nebraska Danger; the Danger defeated the Ice, but Nebraska head coach Mike Davis commented, "Tonight they did some things on us early - that Behrendt kid is going to be a force." By the end of the season, Behrendt threw for 243 yards and three touchdowns to five interceptions, and also caught one pass for 12 yards.

=== Green Bay Blizzard ===
Behrendt returned to Wisconsin to play for the Green Bay Blizzard the following two IFL seasons. Neither year resulted in a playoff berth, although his first season contained success, winning IFL Player of the Week for weeks 12 and 15, and also tying for the league lead in touchdown passes with 63. 2017 in particular was a difficult year; Behrendt finished 2017 on injured reserve, and the Blizzard ended up with a record of 3–13. Behrendt spent 2018 out of football.

=== Tucson Sugar Skulls ===
After a year off from playing, Behrendt signed with the Arizona Rattlers for the 2019 season, until being a preseason cut due to a crowded quarterback room. Behrendt then joined another indoor Arizona team, the Tucson Sugar Skulls for 2019, which proved to be his most efficient, albeit in a part-time role. Behrendt began the season as the starter, and won an early Player of the Week award after throwing 8 touchdowns in a game, but ended up splitting reps with Jake Medlock as the season progressed, with Medlock getting the nod in the playoffs. In his lone professional playoff appearance, Behrendt's only play was a two-yard touchdown rush in a narrow loss to the Sioux Falls Storm. With the 2020 Indoor Football League season cancelled, it was the last snap Behrendt played.

== Career statistics ==
=== IFL ===
Year	Team	Passing								Rushing			
Year	Team	GP	Cmp	Att	Pct	Yds	Y/A	TD	Int	Att	Yds	Avg	TD
2015	Colorado Ice	3	25	39	64.1	243	6.2	3	5	7	15	2.1	0
2016	Green Bay Blizzard	16	227	456	49.8	2,832	6.2	63	14	86	423	4.9	4
2017	Green Bay Blizzard	11	135	279	48.4	1,746	6.3	32	11	60	222	3.7	3
2019	Tucson Sugar Skulls	13	69	104	66.3	731	7.0	20	3	72	334	4.6	10
Career		43	456	878	51.9	5,552	6.3	118	33	225	994	4.4	17

=== College ===
Year	Team	Passing								Rushing			
Year	Team	GP	Cmp	Att	Pct	Yds	Y/A	TD	Int	Att	Yds	Avg	TD
2011	Wisconsin–Whitewater	1	0	0	0.0	0	0.0	0	0	0	0	0.0	0
2012	Wisconsin–Whitewater	8	67	113	59.3	775	6.9	5	5	38	123	3.2	0
2013	Wisconsin–Whitewater	15	302	460	65.7	3,290	7.2	40	1	65	-13	-0.2	0
2014	Wisconsin–Whitewater	15	278	413	67.3	3,670	8.9	42	8	41	73	1.8	0
Career		39	647	986	65.6	7,735	7.8	87	14	114	183	1.6	0

== Coaching career ==
Behrendt returned to Green Bay to serve as the offensive coordinator for the Green Bay Blizzard in 2021, a position which he retained for 2022.
