= 2025 Indoor Football League season =

2025 IFL season
- League: Indoor Football League
- Sport: Indoor American football
- Duration: March 21 – August 23, 2025
- Teams: 14
- TV partner: CBS Sports Network
- Streaming partner: IFL Network

Playoffs
- Eastern champions: Green Bay Blizzard
- Eastern runners-up: Quad City Steamwheelers
- Western champions: Vegas Knight Hawks
- Western runners-up: San Diego Strike Force

2025 IFL National Championship
- Date: August 23, 2025
- Venue: Tucson Arena
- Champions: Vegas Knight Hawks
- Runners-up: Green Bay Blizzard

IFL seasons
- ← 2024 2026 →

The 2025 IFL season was the 17th season of the Indoor Football League (IFL). The season began on March 21, 2025, with the Jacksonville Sharks defeating the Massachusetts Pirates during the IFL Opening Weekend. The regular season concluded on July 27. The playoffs will conclude with the 2025 IFL National Championship, the league's championship game, in Tucson Arena at the Tucson Convention Center in Tucson, Arizona, on August 23.

== Team movement ==
=== Expansion ===
The IFL announced that one team would be established:

- On October 24, 2023, the IFL announced the addition of an expansion team in Indianapolis, Indiana who would play at the brand-new Fishers Event Center starting in 2025. On December 15, the team was named the Fishers Freight.

=== Dormancy ===
The IFL announced that three teams were going dormant:

- On October 16, 2024, the Duke City Gladiators owner Gina Prieskorn-Thomas announced that the team would be dormant. She stated there were problems with the team's marketing strategies due to the COVID-19 pandemic in 2020.
- On October 16, 2024, the Frisco Fighters announced that they would be entering dormant status without specifying why.
- On October 30, 2024, the Sioux Falls Storm announced that they would be going dormant due to their inability to find a secure location to field a team.

== Player movement ==
Positions key
Offense	Defense	Special teams
QB — Quarterback; RB — Running back; FB — Fullback; WR — Wide receiver; TE — Tight end; OL — Offensive lineman; T — Tackle; G — Guard; C — Center	DL — Defensive lineman; DT — Defensive tackle (Note: Includes nose tackle (NT)); DE — Defensive end; EDGE — Edge rusher; LB — Linebacker (Note: Includes middle linebacker (MLB/MIKE), weakside linebacker (WILL), strongside linebacker (SAM), off-ball linebacker, and outside linebacker (OLB)); DB — Defensive back; CB — Cornerback; S — Safety (Note: Includes free safety (FS) and strong safety (SS))	K — Kicker (Note: Also known as a placekicker (PK)); P — Punter; LS — Long snapper; RS — Return specialist (Note: Includes kickoff and punt returners)

=== Free agency ===
Notable players to change teams included:

- Quarterbacks T. J. Edwards (Frisco to Tulsa), Charles McCullum (Salina to Tucson), (Note: Charles McCullum played for the Salina Liberty of the Arena Football League (AFL) during the 2024 season.) Daquan Neal (Bay Area to Quad City), and Drew Powell (Orlando to Arizona) (Note: Drew Powell played for the Orlando Predators of the Arena Football League (AFL) during the 2024 season.)
- Running backs Jimmie Robinson (Massachusetts to Jacksonville) and Edward Vander (Quad City to Jacksonville)
- Wide receivers Kentrez Bell (Sioux Falls to Jacksonville), Shaq Curenton (Rapid City to Iowa), (Note: Shaq Curenton played for the Rapid City Marshals of the Arena Football League (AFL) during the 2024 season.) Glen Gibbons Jr. (Arizona to San Antonio), Johnny King (Hamilton to Vegas, (Note: Johnny King played with the Hamilton Tiger-Cats of the Canadian Football League (CFL) for the 2024 season.) Jordan Kress (San Diego to Fishers), Elijah Lilly (San Diego to Arizona), Phazione McClurge (Frisco to Tulsa), Jerrime Neal (Arizona to Tulsa), J. T. Stokes (Bay Area to Fishers), and Tamorrion Terry (Duke City to Vegas)
- Defensive lineman Chima Dunga (Tulsa to Quad City) and Jaylin Swan (Quad City to Fishers)
- Defensive backs Jericho Flowers (Vegas to San Diego), Tyrell Pearson (Frisco to Fishers), Elijah Reed (Sioux Falls to San Diego), Ravarius Rivers (Green Bay to San Antonio) and Shawn Steele II (Green Bay to Fishers)
- Kicker Ernesto Lacayo (Duke City to San Diego)

=== League call-ups ===
- Offensive lineman Johari Branch (UFL – DC), Devin Hayes (CFL – Edmonton), Deiyantei Powell-Woods (CFL – Calgary), and Barry Wesley (UFL – Birmingham)
- Defensive lineman Israel Antwine (UFL – Houston), Atlias Bell (CFL – Toronto), and Daymond Williams (CFL – Toronto)
- Linebacker Jaiden Woodbey (CFL – Winnipeg)
- Defensive backs Latavious Brini (CFL – Winnipeg), Javaris Davis (CFL – Winnipeg), Cyrus Fagan (CFL – Calgary), and Amir Riep (UFL – Memphis)

== Rule changes ==
The following rule changes were approved at the IFL annual league meeting on January 13–14 in Phoenix, Arizona:

- Any kicked ball that passes through the end zone without touching the field of play will now be marked at the kicking team’s 20-yard line. The previous adjustment to the 25-yard line has been removed for consistency.
- If a team leading by 14 points or fewer has possession of the ball during the last minute, they must gain positive yardage; otherwise, the clock will stop. The former rule requiring positive yardage in the final 60 seconds of the game has been reinstated.
- A linebacker who declares a blitz may now rush from inside or outside the alley. The league has eliminated the restriction on linebackers blitzing outside of the alley.
- Defensive linemen are now permitted to execute twist moves.
- The 1-yard grace for wide receivers in motion crossing the line of scrimmage has been removed. A receiver’s foot crossing the line at the snap will now be considered a false start. Other body parts, such as the knee, hand, or head, will not determine the penalty.

== Regular season ==
The season will be played over a 19-week schedule, beginning on March 21, 2025, and ending on July 27, 2025. Each of the league's 14 teams will play 16 games, with three bye weeks.

== Regular season standings ==
Eastern Conference
	W	L	PCT	CONF
Quad City Steamwheelers	11	5	.688	10–5
Green Bay Blizzard	10	6	.625	10–4
Tulsa Oilers	10	6	.625	6–4
Jacksonville Sharks	10	6	.625	6–5
Massachusetts Pirates	7	9	.438	7–6
Fishers Freight	7	9	.438	4–7
Iowa Barnstormers	1	15	.063	1–13

Western Conference
	W	L	PCT	CONF
Bay Area Panthers	13	3	.813	10–3
Vegas Knight Hawks	10	6	.625	8–5
San Diego Strike Force (Note: San Diego holds the tiebreaker over Arizona by conference record.)	10	6	.625	10–5
Arizona Rattlers	10	6	.625	8–5
Tucson Sugar Skulls	6	10	.375	5–9
San Antonio Gunslingers	5	11	.313	4–6
Northern Arizona Wranglers	2	14	.125	1–13

== Coaches poll ==
	Wk 2	Wk 3	Wk 4	Wk 5	Wk 6	Wk 7	Wk 8	Wk 9	Wk 10	Wk 11	Wk 12	Wk 13	Wk 14	Wk 15	Wk 16	Wk 17	Wk 18	Final
Arizona Rattlers	2	1	1	1	1	1	2	1	1	1	1	4	5	6	5	6	3	3
Bay Area Panthers	3	10	8	5	3	3	3	3	2	2	2	1	1	1	1	2	1	1
Fishers Freight	8	6	4	4	5	10	11	11	12	13	12	13	13	12	11	11	11	9
Green Bay Blizzard	9	7	9	6	6	4	7	7	6	6	5	5	3	3	6	7	6	4
Iowa Barnstormers	12	12	14	14	13	11	13	13	13	12	14	14	14	14	14	14	14	14
Jacksonville Sharks	4	4	2	2	4	5	4	4	3	4	6	3	7	5	3	4	7	8
Massachusetts Pirates	10	11	11	11	8	9	9	10	11	10	9	9	9	8	8	8	9	10
Northern Arizona Wranglers	14	14	13	13	14	14	14	14	14	14	13	12	12	13	13	13	13	13
Quad City Steamwheelers	7	3	3	3	2	2	1	2	5	5	3	2	2	2	2	1	2	2
San Antonio Gunslingers	11	9	7	9	11	12	12	12	10	11	10	10	11	11	12	12	12	12
San Diego Strike Force	6	8	10	10	10	7	8	8	9	7	7	7	4	4	4	3	4	6
Tucson Sugar Skulls	13	13	12	12	12	13	10	9	8	9	11	11	10	10	10	9	10	11
Tulsa Oilers	5	5	6	8	7	8	5	5	4	3	4	8	6	9	9	10	8	7
Vegas Knight Hawks	1	2	5	7	9	6	6	6	7	8	8	6	8	7	7	5	5	5

Legend
Improvement in ranking
Drop in ranking
No change in ranking

== Postseason ==
=== 2025 IFL playoffs ===
4	Jacksonville	41
1	Quad City	57
Eastern Conference
1	Quad City	64
2	Green Bay	71
Eastern Conference Championship
3	Tulsa	26
Aug 23 – Tucson Arena
2	Green Bay	58
IFL Playoffs Round One
2	Green Bay	61
4	Vegas	64
2025 IFL National Championship
4	Vegas	36
1	Bay Area	31
Western Conference
4	Vegas	74
3	San Diego	68
Western Conference Championship
3	San Diego	49
2	Arizona	48

== Awards ==
Award	Winner	Position	Team	Ref
Most Valuable Player	Max Meylor	Quarterback	Green Bay Blizzard	
Offensive Player of the Year	Josh Tomas	Running Back	Bay Area Panthers	
Defensive Player of the Year	Joe Foucha	Defensive Back	Bay Area Panthers	
Special Teams Player of the Year	Antonio Wimbush	Kick returner	Vegas Knight Hawks	
Offensive Rookie of the Year	Ron Brown Jr.	Running Back	Arizona Rattlers	
Defensive Rookie of the Year	Caleb Streat	Defensive Back	Iowa Barnstormers	
Coach of the Year	Cory Ross	Head coach	Quad City Steamwheelers	
Assistant Coach of the Year	Matt Behrendt	Offensive Coordinator	Green Bay Blizzard	
IFL National Championship Most Valuable Player	Jayden de Laura	Quarterback	Vegas Knight Hawks	

=== All-IFL teams ===
All-IFL First Team
Offense
QB	Max Meylor (GB)
RB	Antonio Wimbush (VEG)
WR	Quentin Randolph (VEG); Quian Williams (IA); Nyqwan Murray (SA)
C	Joe Krall (QC)
OL	Kristopher Stroughter (AZ); Christian Coulter (BA); Navaugh Donaldson (MAS)
Defense
DL	Jaylin Swan (FIS); Jonathan Ross (BA); Keshaun Moore (QC)
LB	Alan Arslanian (QC)
LB/DB	Davontae Merriweather (AZ)
DB	Joe Foucha (BA); Trae Meadows (BA); Caleb Streat (IA)
Special Teams
K	Andrew Mevis (GB)
KR	Antonio Wimbush (VEG)

IFL All-Rookie Team
Offense
QB	James Cahoon (IA)
RB	Ron Brown Jr. (AZ)
WR	TJ Davis (GB); Jalen Bracey (IA); Tyrese Chambers (BA)
C	AJ Forbes (FIS)
OL	Christian Coulter (BA); Jaime Navarro (BA)
Defense
DL	David Cagle (QC); Allen Henry (GB); Qaaddir Sheppard (QC)
LB	Hayden Hatcher (JAC)
LB/DB	Marquis Waters (MAS)
DB	Malik Jones (JAC); Caleb Streat (IA); Chris Chunwuneke (QC)
Special Teams
K	Tyler Huettel (SA)
KR	Arland Bruce (NAZ)

All-IFL Second Team
Offense
QB	Josh Jones (BA)
RB	Pooka Williams Jr. (MAS)
WR	T. J. Davis (GB); Deshon Stoudemire (NAZ); Tyrese Chambers (BA)
C	Andrew Carter (GB)
OL	Jake Parks (GB); Jeremy Cooper (FIS); Laquinston Sharp (FIS)
Defense
DL	Claude Davis (VEG); Kivon Bennett (JAC); Wallace Cowins Jr. (SD)
LB	Royce See (SD)
LB/DB	Tre Harvey (TUL)
DB	Camron Harrell (QC); Malik Jones (JAC); James Ceasar (VEG)
Special Teams
K	Kyle Kaplan (QC)
KR	Joshua Tomas (BA)

=== Players of the Week ===
The following were named the top performers during the season:

Week	Offensive	Defensive	Special Teams
1	Daquan Neal QB (Quad City)	Malik Jones DB (Jacksonville)	Tyler King KR (Jacksonville)
2	No awards given		
3	Dalton Sneed QB (Arizona)	Alan Arslanian LB (Quad City)	Andrew Mevis K (Green Bay)
4	T. J. Edwards QB (Tulsa)	Joe Foucha DB (Bay Area)	Devin Hafford KR (Fishers)
5	T. J. Edwards QB (Tulsa)	JaQuez Jackson LB (Tucson)	Axel Perez K (Bay Area)
6	Max Meylor QB (Green Bay)	Caleb Streat DB (Iowa)	Kyle Kaplan K (Quad City)
7	Joshua Tomas WR (Bay Area)	Taylor Hawkins DB (Tulsa)	Kevin Macias K (Tucson)
8	T. J. Edwards QB (Tulsa)	Ahmad Lyons DB (Tucson)	Quian Williams KR (Iowa)
9	Max Meylor QB (Green Bay)	Andre White LB (Green Bay)	Quian Williams KR (Iowa)
10	T. J. Edwards QB (Tulsa)	Javaris Davis DB (Jacksonville)	Antonio Wimbush KR (Vegas)
11	Joaquin Collazo QB (San Antonio)	Atoa Fox DB (San Diego)	Antonio Wimbush KR (Vegas)
12	Nate Davis QB (San Diego)	Nicholas Harris DB (Quad City)	Kyle Kaplan K (Quad City)
13	Max Meylor QB (Green Bay)	Jamyest Williams RB (Tucson)	Kyle Kaplan K (Quad City)
14	Tyler Huff QB (Jacksonville)	John McMullen DL (Tucson)	Antonio Wimbush KR (Vegas)
15	Ron Brown Jr. RB (Arizona)	Aaron Jackson DB (Fishers)	Dylan Barnas K (Jacksonville)
16	Kenji Bahar QB (Massachusetts	Tre Henry DL (Tucson)	Kevin Macias K (Tucson)
17	Max Meylor QB (Green Bay)	Michael Miller DB (San Antonio)	Josiah King KR (Fishers)
18	Sam Castronova QB (Tulsa)	Bryce Hampton DB (Vegas)	Andrew Mevis K (Green Bay)
19	Sam Castronova QB (Tulsa)	Jaylin Swan DL (Fishers)	Kyle Kaplan K (Quad City)

== Head coaching changes ==
=== Off-season ===
Team	Departing coach	Incoming coach	Notes
Fishers Freight	—	Dixie Wooten	
Massachusetts Pirates	Rod Miller	Ameer Ismail	After one season, an 8–8 (.500) regular season record, and a 2024 IFL National Championship appearance, Miller left Massachusetts and joined the San Diego Strike Force as their associate head coach and defensive coordinator on October 11, 2024. On November 25, the Pirates hired Ameer Ismail as their head coach, this will be his second stint with the team. Ismail previously served as the head coach of the Bloomington Edge in 2017, Massachusetts Pirates in 2018, and the Iowa Barnstormers from 2020–2021. He has compiled a 34–16 (.680) regular season record and is 0–3 (.000) in three playoff appearances.
Northern Arizona Wranglers	Les Moss	Ron James	On August 31, 2024, Moss stepped down as the head coach of Northern Arizona after leading the team to two playoff appearances, an IFL National Championship title, and a 28–19 (.596) regular season record. James was hired as Northern Arizona's head coach on September 16, after serving five seasons as the head football coach of Juan Diego Catholic High School. This is James' seventh indoor football head coaching job, serving as the head coach of the Las Vegas Gladiators from 2005–2006, Utah Blaze from 2010–2013, Pittsburgh Power in 2014, Portland Steel in 2016, Tampa Bay Storm in 2017, and Atlantic City Blackjacks in 2019. In his time as an Arena Football League (AFL) head coach, James compiled a 74–77 (.490) regular season record, two AFL Coach of the Year awards, and an ArenaBowl XXX appearance.

=== In-season ===
Team	Departing coach	Incoming coach	Notes
Massachusetts Pirates	Ameer Ismail	Frederick Griggs	On March 9, 2025, Griggs was elevated from associate defensive coordinator and defensive backs coach to head coach after Ismail failed to report to camp, citing that he was looking for coaching jobs on the outdoor spring circuit.
San Antonio Gunslingers	Tom Menas	James Fuller	On March 31, 2025, Menas was relieved of his duties as general manager and head coach. Fuller was elevated from assistant head coach and offensive coordinator to head coach.
Massachusetts Pirates	Frederick Griggs	Tom Menas	On April 30, 2025, Griggs was relieved of his duties as interim head coach and defensive coordinator, hiring Menas to take both roles.

== Arenas ==
- On October 24, 2023, the IFL announced that a 2025 Indianapolis expansion team – later to be named the Fishers Freight – would play in the Fishers Event Center.
- On October 1, 2024, the IFL announced a three-year partnership between the San Diego Strike Force and Frontwave Arena that would start in 2025.
- On October 20, 2024, the Sioux Falls Storm announced that they had been evicted from Denny Sanford Premier Center after its owners had refused to offer a lease renewal.
- On October 21, 2024, it was announced that Casey's bought the naming rights of Wells Fargo Arena. Starting on July 1, 2025, the arena was renamed Casey's Center.
- On November 7, 2024, the IFL announced a three-year agreement to hold the IFL National Championship at the Tucson Convention Center starting in 2025.

== Broadcasting ==
On March 12, 2025, the IFL announced a multi-year partnership with Visaic to launch the IFL Network, a subscription video service that will carry all IFL games live and on-demand. The agreement brings an end to the IFL's broadcasting of its games on YouTube.

In July the IFL entered into a deal with Victory+ which gave them a national game of the week broadcast.

CBS Sports Network is on the third and final year in a contract to carry the IFL National Championship.
