= Jiya Wright =

American football player (born 2000)

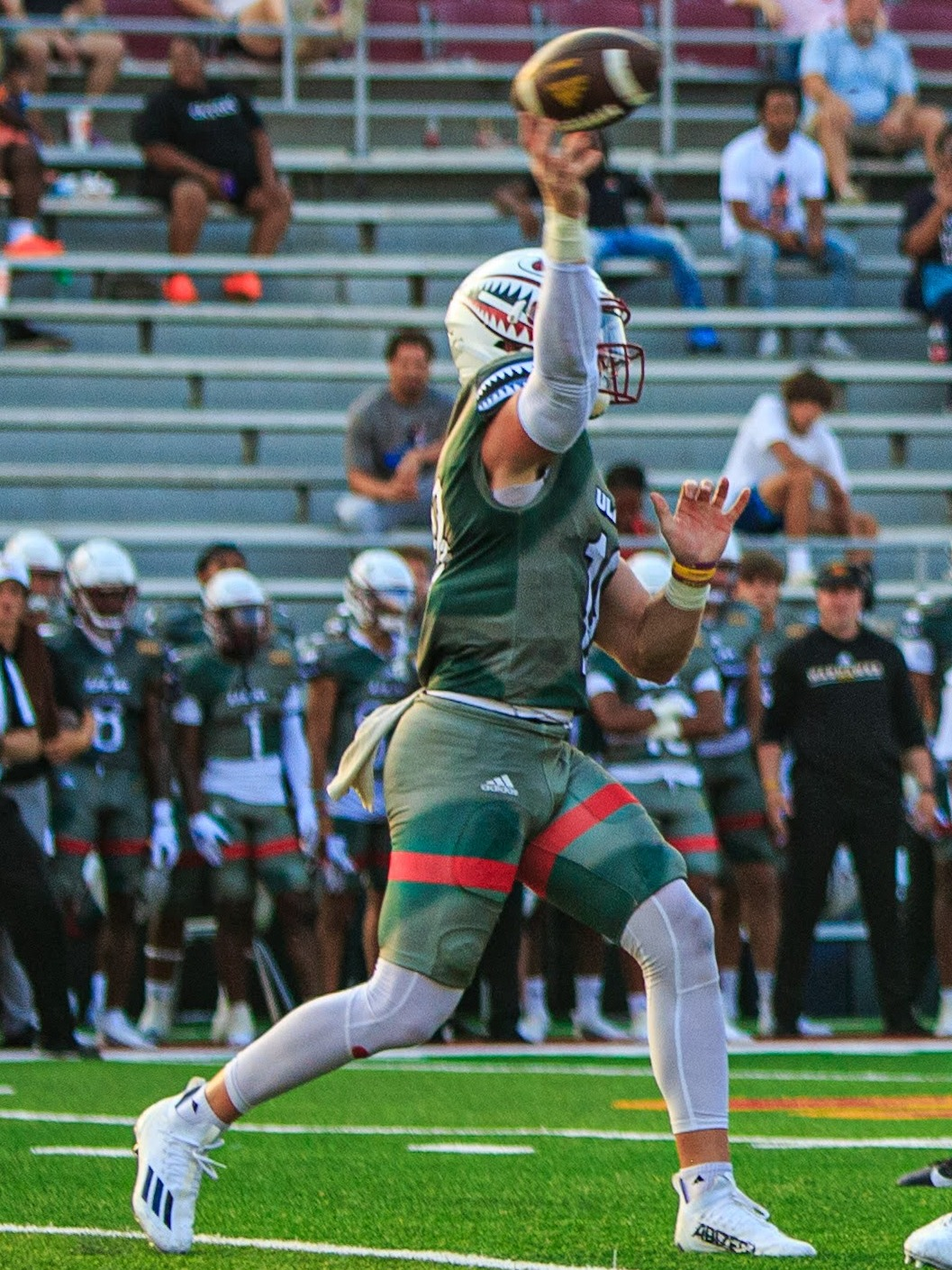
- Wright with Louisiana–Monroe in 2023

IBM Big Blue
- Position: Quarterback

Personal information
- Born: March 4, 2000 (age 26)
- Listed height: 6 ft 1 in (1.85 m)
- Listed weight: 202 lb (92 kg)

Career information
- High school: Homestead (Fort Wayne, Indiana)
- College: Northern Illinois (2018); Florida Tech (2019); Fort Scott CC (2020); Louisiana–Monroe (2021–2023)
- NFL draft: 2024: undrafted

Career history
- Sioux Falls Storm (2024); Fishers Freight (2025); Mexicas de la Ciudad de México (2025); IBM Big Blue (2026–present)

Awards and highlights
- Tazón México champion (VIII)

Jiya Austen Wright (born March 4, 2000) is an American football quarterback for the IBM Big Blue of the X-League. He played college football for the Northern Illinois Huskies, Florida Tech Panthers, Fort Scott Greyhounds, and Louisiana–Monroe Warhawks.

Wright led the Mexicas de la Ciudad de México to a Tazón México title in 2025.

== Early life ==
Wright grew up in Fort Wayne, Indiana and attended Homestead High School. In his high school football career, Wright completed 265 of his 411 pass attempts for 3,632 yards, 38 touchdowns and 19 interceptions. Wright would also rush for 1,717 yards and 23 touchdowns. He was rated a two-star recruit and committed to play college football at Northern Illinois University.

== College career ==
=== Northern Illinois ===
As a freshman in 2018, Wright was redshirted.

=== Florida Tech ===
Wright transferred to Florida Tech and played for its football team in 2019. Once the program announced its elimination due to financial concerns amid the COVID-19 pandemic, Wright announced that he was transferring to Fort Scott Community College.

=== Fort Scott CC ===
During the 2020 season, Wright started all three games and finished the season with 345 total offensive yards and three scores, 251 passing yards, two touchdowns and three interceptions.

=== Louisiana–Monroe ===
In 2021, Wright appeared in four games and finished the season with 82 offensive snaps, 291 total offensive yards and three touchdowns along with 10 of 20 passing attempts for 164 yards, two touchdowns and two interceptions. In 2022, he appeared in only two games as he suffered a rib injury during the season opener against Texas. He finished the season with one rushing attempt for three yards. In 2023, Wright was named the starting quarterback.

== Professional career ==
Pre-draft measurables
Height	Weight	Arm length	Hand span	40-yard dash	10-yard split	20-yard split	20-yard shuttle	Three-cone drill	Vertical jump	Broad jump	Bench press
5 ft 11 3/5 in (1.82 m)	205 lb (93 kg)	31 3/8 in (0.80 m)	9 1/2 in (0.24 m)	4.76 s	1.68 s	2.65 s	4.27 s	7.09 s	35.5 in (0.90 m)	10 ft 6 in (3.20 m)	17 reps
All values from Pro Day

=== Sioux Falls Storm ===
After not being selected in the 2024 NFL draft, Wright signed with the Sioux Falls Storm of the Indoor Football League (IFL) on May 23, 2024.

=== Fishers Freight ===
On October 15, 2024, Wright signed to play for the Fishers Freight of the IFL.

=== Mexicas de la Ciudad de México ===
On June 8, 2025, Wright signed with the Mexicas de la Ciudad de México of the Liga de Fútbol Americano Profesional (LFA) as an emergency backup. He made his team debut one day after he arrived in Mexico City, replacing injured starter Marco Durán in the first quarter and scoring a rushing touchdown in a 16–3 win over the previously undefeated Osos de Monterrey. The following week, Wright threw three touchdowns in a 33–20 win over the Dinos de Saltillo. However, he was sidelined by an injury on the Mexicas' opening drive of the regular season finale, a 30–17 defeat to the Caudillos de Chihuahua. Despite suffering their first loss of the season, the Mexicas finished with a league-best 7–1 record.

In the semifinals, Wright rushed for two touchdowns and passed for another in a 43–28 victory over the Arcángeles de Puebla. He then led the Mexicas to a 13–12 win over the Osos de Monterrey in Tazón México VIII, the league's championship game, for the second title in franchise history.

=== IBM Big Blue ===
On March 31, 2026, Wright signed with the IBM Big Blue of the X-League.

== Career statistics ==
=== College ===
Season	Team	Games			Passing								Rushing			
Season	Team	GP	GS	Record	Cmp	Att	Pct	Yds	Y/A	TD	Int	Rtg	Att	Yds	Avg	TD
2018	Northern Illinois	0	0	—	Redshirted (redshirt)											
2019	Florida Tech	0	0	—	DNP											
2020–21	Fort Scott	3	3	0–3	26	62	41.9	251	4.0	2	3	76.9	19	64	3.3	1
2021	Louisiana–Monroe	4	0	—	10	20	50.0	164	8.2	2	2	131.9	33	127	3.8	1
2022	Louisiana–Monroe	2	0	—	Did not record pass attempt								1	3	3.0	0
2023	Louisiana–Monroe	12	8	1–7	107	204	52.5	1,246	6.1	10	8	112.1	99	264	2.7	2
FBS career		18	8	1–7	117	224	52.2	1,410	6.3	12	10	113.9	133	394	3.0	3
