= List of Southeast Missouri State Redhawks in the NFL draft =

This is a list of Southeast Missouri State Redhawks football players in the NFL draft.

== Key ==
| B | Back | K | Kicker | NT | Nose tackle |
| C | Center | LB | Linebacker | FB | Fullback |
| DB | Defensive back | P | Punter | HB | Halfback |
| DE | Defensive end | QB | Quarterback | WR | Wide receiver |
| DT | Defensive tackle | RB | Running back | G | Guard |
| E | End | T | Offensive tackle | TE | Tight end |

| = Pro Bowler |
| = Hall of Famer |

== Selections ==
| Year | Round | Pick | Overall | Player | Team | Position |
|---|---|---|---|---|---|---|
| 1955 | 25 | 7 | 296 | Ken Dement | New York Giants | T |
| 1958 | 17 | 10 | 203 | John Wittenborn | San Francisco 49ers | T |
| 1958 | 23 | 1 | 266 | John Harbour | Chicago Cardinals | T |
| 1972 | 13 | 1 | 313 | Ed Moss | Buffalo Bills | RB |
| 1973 | 14 | 8 | 346 | Dan Peiffer | St. Louis Cardinals | G |
| 1974 | 12 | 17 | 303 | Dave Means | Buffalo Bills | DE |
| 1978 | 8 | 10 | 204 | Mike Wood | Minnesota Vikings | K |
| 1980 | 9 | 10 | 231 | Kent Davis | Buffalo Bills | DB |
| 1989 | 8 | 19 | 214 | Rick Aeilts | Cleveland Browns | TE |
| 1990 | 6 | 11 | 148 | Tony Walker | Indianapolis Colts | LB |
| 1998 | 7 | 32 | 221 | Angel Rubio | Pittsburgh Steelers | DT |
| 2003 | 6 | 26 | 199 | Willie Ponder | New York Giants | WR |
| 2004 | 7 | 38 | 239 | Eugene Amano | Tennessee Titans | C |
| 2018 | 7 | 30 | 248 | Kendall Donnerson | Green Bay Packers | LB |
| 2019 | 6 | 16 | 189 | Drew Forbes | Cleveland Browns | T |
| 2024 | 6 | 40 | 216 | Ryan Flournoy | Dallas Cowboys | WR |

== Notable undrafted players ==
Note: No drafts held before 1936

| Debut year | Player name | Position | Debut NFL/AFL team | Notes |
|---|---|---|---|---|
| 1960 | Ken Iman | C | Green Bay Packers | — |
| 1983 | Ted Banker | G | New York Jets | — |
| 1987 | David Jackson | WR | Tampa Bay Buccaneers | — |
| 1991 | Brian Lattimore | RB | Indianapolis Colts | — |
| 1996 | Marquis Walker | DB | Washington Redskins | — |
| 2001 | Jason Witczak | PK | Tennessee Titans | — |
| 2005 | Dan Connolly | G | Jacksonville Jaguars | — |
| 2007 | Edgar Jones | DE | Baltimore Ravens | — |
| 2016 | Paul McRoberts | WR | Los Angeles Rams | — |
| 2018 | Mike Ford | CB | Detroit Lions | — |
| 2020 | Aaron Adeoye | DE | Baltimore Ravens | — |
| 2020 | Kristian Wilkerson | WR | New England Patriots | — |
| 2023 | Johnny King | WR | Indianapolis Colts | — |
| 2024 | Lawrence Johnson | S | New Orleans Saints | — |
