= San Antonio Gunslingers =

San Antonio Gunslingers may refer to:

- San Antonio Gunslingers (USFL team), a 1984–1985 American football team
- San Antonio Gunslingers (indoor football), a team since 2020 in the Indoor Football League
