= Tulsa Oilers (disambiguation) =

The Tulsa Oilers are a professional ice hockey team currently playing in the ECHL.

Tulsa Oilers may also refer to:

- Tulsa Oilers (IFL), a professional indoor football team currently playing in the Indoor Football League
- Tulsa Oilers (1964–1984), defunct professional ice hockey team which played 20 seasons in the original Central Hockey League
- Tulsa Oilers (1928–51), defunct professional ice hockey team that started in the American Hockey Association
- Tulsa Oilers (baseball), defunct minor league baseball team which played off-and-on from 1905 to 1976
