= Jeff Jarnigan =

American football executive

Arizona Rattlers
- Title: General manager

Career information
- College: Southwestern (KS)

Career history
- Fort Hays State (1988) (OL); Bethel (KS) (1989–1992) (AC); Morningside (1993–1994) (DL); Carleton (1995–1999) (OL); Minnesota Rage (2000) (HC); Tulsa Talons (2001–2003) (DC/DL); Austin Wranglers (2004) (DC); Oklahoma City Yard Dawgz (2005–2006) (HC); San Jose SaberCats (2007) (ST/DL); San Jose SaberCats (2008) (DC); San Jose SaberCats (2011) (ST/DC); San Jose SaberCats (2012) (ST/OL); San Jose SaberCats (2013) (ST); San Jose SaberCats (2014–2015) (ST/OL/DL); Arizona Rattlers (2016–2019) (AGM/AC); Arizona Rattlers (2020–present) (GM)

Awards and highlights
- 2× ArenaBowl champion (2007, 2015); ArenaCup champion (2003); United Bowl champion (2017); IFL national champion (2024)

Jeff Jarnigan is an American football executive who is the general manager for the Arizona Rattlers of the Indoor Football League (IFL).

== Biography ==
A native of Oklahoma, Jarnigan played football at Southwestern College; shortly after graduating, he began a coaching career. From 1988 to 1999, Jarnigan was employed by four collegiate programs (Fort Hays State University, Bethel College, Morningside College, and Carleton College; at each, he generally served as either an offensive line or defensive line coach. In 2000, Jarnigan landed his first head coaching position; he coached the Minnesota Rage of the Indoor Football League for one year.

In 2001, Jarnigan became the defensive coordinator for the Tulsa Talons of the AF2. During his three seasons in Tulsa, the team went 44–10; Jarnigan's tenure culminated with the Talons' victory over the Macon Knights in ArenaCup IV. Jarnigan was subsequently named defensive coordinator of the AFL's Austin Wranglers in 2004. His success there led to his being appointed head coach of the AF2's Oklahoma City Yard Dawgz in 2005. Under Jarnigan, the Dawgz went 10–6 and 11–5 in 2005 and 2006; both times, however, they suffered narrow losses in the first round of the AF2 playoffs.

Jarnigan returned to the AFL in 2007. That year, he was named the Special Teams/Defensive Line coach for the San Jose SaberCats. In Jarnigan's first year, the SaberCats' special teams improved greatly; he won his first AFL Championship at the end of the season, when the SaberCats defeated the Columbus Destroyers in ArenaBowl XXI. Jarnigan was promoted to the position of defensive coordinator in 2008. The SaberCats' defense nominally regressed that year; a strong second half, however, saw the team reach ArenaBowl XXII (which it lost to the Philadelphia Soul).

The SaberCats, along with the rest of the Arena Football League, suspended operations in 2009. In 2011, the team returned to action; Jarnigan was once again named the team's defensive coordinator. A poor showing from San Jose's new–look defense lead the SaberCats to replace Jarnigan with Cedric Walker as defensive coordinator; he was retained, however, as an offensive line/special teams coach. Since 2012, Jarnigan has experienced considerable success in a variety of coaching capacities. Most recently, in 2015, he served as a hybrid offensive line/defensive line/special teams coach for the SaberCats. That season, the defensive line flourished under Jarnigan's guidance (recording a league-high 42 sacks); at the end of the season, he won a second AFL Championship as the SaberCats defeated the Jacksonville Sharks in ArenaBowl XXVIII. He was employed by the team for a total of seven years and was the only assistant coach to have been continuously employed by the team since its 2011 return.

In 2016, he joined the Arizona Rattlers in the AFL as an assistant general manager and defensive line coach after the SabreCats ceased operations. In 2017, the Rattlers left the AFL and joined the Indoor Football League, winning the league championship in their first season of participation. After the 2019 season, Jarnigan was promoted to general manager.

== Head coaching record ==
=== af2 ===
Team	Year	Regular season				Postseason			
Team	Year	Won	Lost	Win %	Finish	Won	Lost	Win %	Result
OKC	2005	10	6	.625	2nd in Midwest	0	1	.000	Lost to Amarillo Dusters in wild card round
OKC	2006	11	5	.688	2nd in Midwest	0	1	.000	Lost to Arkansas Twisters in wild card round
Total		21	11	.656		0	2	.000	
