= Javaris Davis =

American football player (born 1997)

No. 3 – Orlando Pirates
- Position: Cornerback
- Roster status: Active

Personal information
- Born: December 26, 1996 (age 29); Jacksonville, Florida, U.S.
- Listed height: 5 ft 8 in (1.73 m)
- Listed weight: 183 lb (83 kg)

Career information
- High school: Ed White (Jacksonville)
- College: Auburn
- NFL draft: 2020: undrafted

Career history
- Kansas City Chiefs (2020)*; Miami Dolphins (2020–2021); Cincinnati Bengals (2022)*; Orlando Guardians (2023); Arlington Renegades (2023); Jacksonville Sharks (2025)*; Winnipeg Blue Bombers (2025)*; Jacksonville Sharks (2025); Winnipeg Blue Bombers (2026)*; Orlando Pirates (2026–present)
- * Offseason or practice squad member only

Awards and highlights
- XFL champion (2023)

Career NFL statistics
- Total tackles: 2
- Pass deflections: 1
- Stats at Pro Football Reference

Javaris Davis (born December 26, 1996) is an American professional football cornerback for the Orlando Pirates of the Indoor Football League (IFL). He played college football for Auburn. He has played for the Miami Dolphins of the National Football League (NFL), the Orlando Guardians and Arlington Renegades of the XFL, and the Jacksonville Sharks of the Indoor Football League (IFL).

== College career ==
Davis was a member of the Auburn Tigers. He made the freshman All-SEC team in 2016. He finished his college career with 150 tackles, 32 passes broken up, eight interceptions, and one forced fumble in 49 games played with 35 starts.

== Professional career ==
Pre-draft measurables
Height	Weight	Arm length	Hand span	40-yard dash	10-yard split	20-yard split	Vertical jump	Broad jump	Bench press
5 ft 8 1/2 in (1.74 m)	183 lb (83 kg)	30 5/8 in (0.78 m)	8 7/8 in (0.23 m)	4.39 s	1.54 s	2.59 s	35.5 in (0.90 m)	10 ft 4 in (3.15 m)	11 reps
All values from NFL Combine

=== Kansas City Chiefs ===
Davis was signed by the Kansas City Chiefs as a undrafted free agent on April 30, 2020. He was waived on July 26, 2020.

=== Miami Dolphins ===
Davis was claimed off waivers by the Miami Dolphins on July 27, 2020. He was waived by the team on August 6, 2020. The Dolphins signed Davis to their practice squad on September 6, 2020. He signed a reserve/future contract with the Dolphins on January 5, 2021. Davis was waived by the Dolphins during final roster cuts on August 31, 2021, and re-signed to the practice squad the next day. Davis was elevated to the active roster on November 28, 2021, for the team's Week 12 game against the Carolina Panthers. He signed a reserve/future contract with the Dolphins on January 11, 2022. He was released on June 9, 2022.

=== Cincinnati Bengals ===
On August 17, 2022, Davis signed with the Cincinnati Bengals. He was waived on August 30, 2022.

=== Orlando Guardians ===
Davis was placed on the reserve list by the Orlando Guardians of the XFL on February 23, 2023. He was released on March 15.

=== Arlington Renegades ===
Davis was signed by the Arlington Renegades of the XFL on March 28, 2023. He was not part of the roster after the 2024 UFL dispersal draft on January 15, 2024.

=== Jacksonville Sharks ===
Davis signed with the Jacksonville Sharks of the Indoor Football League (IFL) in January 2025.

=== Winnipeg Blue Bombers ===
He was signed by the Winnipeg Blue Bombers of the Canadian Football League on February 18, 2025. He was placed on the Blue Bombers' reserve/suspended list on May 11, 2025.

=== Jacksonville Sharks (second stint) ===
Davis returned to play for the Sharks during the 2025 IFL season, and was named the IFL Defensive Player of the Week for Week 10.

=== Winnipeg Blue Bombers (second stint) ===
On November 29, 2025, he re-signed with the Blue Bombers for the 2026 season. He was placed on the reserve/suspended list on May 10, 2026.

=== Orlando Pirates ===
On May 7, 2026, Davis signed with the Orlando Pirates of the IFL.
