= Western Conference (IFL) =

- League: Indoor Football League
- Sport: Indoor football
- Founded: 2022
- No. of teams: 9
- Most recent champion: Vegas Knight Hawks (1st title)
- Most titles: Arizona Rattlers (1 title); Bay Area Panthers; Northern Arizona Wranglers; Vegas Knight Hawks

The Western Conference (WC) is a conference of the Indoor Football League (IFL), the highest level of professional indoor football in the United States. The Western Conference and its counterpart, the Eastern Conference, each have seven teams and were created as part of the 2022 IFL expansion.

== Teams ==
=== Active teams ===
| Team | Location | Arena | Joined |
|---|---|---|---|
| Arizona Rattlers | Glendale, Arizona | Desert Diamond Arena | 2022 |
| New Mexico Chupacabras (Note: The Duke City Gladiators were in the Western Conference from 2022 to 2024 before going dormant in 2025. They rejoined the conference in 2026 and rebranded to the New Mexico Chupacabras.) | Albuquerque, New Mexico | Tingley Coliseum | 2026 |
| Northern Arizona Wranglers | Prescott Valley, Arizona | Findlay Toyota Center | 2022 |
| San Antonio Gunslingers | San Antonio, Texas | Freeman Coliseum | 2024 |
| San Diego Strike Force | San Diego, California | Pechanga Arena | 2022 |
| Texas Draft | Cedar Park, Texas | H-E-B Center at Cedar Park | 2027 |
| Tucson Sugar Skulls | Tucson, Arizona | Tucson Arena | 2022 |
| Tulsa Oilers | Tulsa, Oklahoma | BOK Center | 2027 (Note: Played in the Eastern Conference (IFL) from 2022-2026 before moving to the Western Conference starting in 2027.) |
| Vegas Knight Hawks | Henderson, Nevada | Lee's Family Forum | 2022 |

== WC Championships ==
| Season | Date | Winning team | Score | Losing team | Arena | Location | Ref. |
|---|---|---|---|---|---|---|---|
| 2022 | July 30, 2022 | Northern Arizona Wranglers | 52–51 | Arizona Rattlers | Footprint Center | Phoenix, Arizona | |
| 2023 | July 29, 2023 | Bay Area Panthers | 68–46 | Northern Arizona Wranglers | SAP Center | San Jose, California | |
| 2024 | August 5, 2024 | Arizona Rattlers | 58–23 | San Diego Strike Force | Desert Diamond Arena | Glendale, Arizona | |
| 2025 | August 8, 2025 | Vegas Knight Hawks | 74-68 | San Diego Strike Force | Lee's Family Forum | Henderson, Nevada | |

== Division champions ==
| Season | Team | Record | Postseason results |
Western Conference
| 2022 | Arizona Rattlers (1) | 13–3 | Won Round One (Gladiators) 53–14; Lost WC Championship (Wranglers) 52-51 |
| 2023 | Arizona Rattlers (2) | 11–4 | Lost Round One (Wranglers) 62-53 |
| 2024 | Bay Area Panthers (1) | 13–3 | Lost Round One (Strike Force) 49-40 |
| 2025 | Bay Area Panthers (2) | 13–3 | Lost Round One (Knight Hawks) 36-31 |
| 2026 | San Diego Strike Force (1) | 13-3 | Won Round One (Sugar Skulls) 54-47; Lost WC Championship (Rattlers) 43-37 |

== Wild Card qualifiers ==
| Season | Team | Record | Postseason results |
Western Conference
| 2022 | Northern Arizona Wranglers | 12–4 | Won Round One (Sugar Skulls) 49–30; Won WC Championship (at Rattlers) 52–51; Won IFL National Championship (vs. Steamwheelers) 47–45 |
| 2022 | Tucson Sugar Skulls | 9–7 | Lost Round One (at Wranglers) 30–49 |
| 2022 | Duke City Gladiators | 8–8 | Lost Round One (at Rattlers) 14–53 |
| 2023 | Bay Area Panthers | 10–5 | Won Round One (Sugar Skulls) 46–34; Won WC Championship (Wranglers) 68–46; Won IFL National Championship (vs. Storm) 51–41 |
| 2023 | Tucson Sugar Skulls | 9–6 | Lost Round One (at Panthers) 34–46 |
| 2023 | Northern Arizona Wranglers | 7–8 | Won Round One (at Rattlers) 62–53; Lost WC Championship (at Panthers) 46–68 |
| 2024 | Vegas Knight Hawks | 11–5 | Lost Round One (at Rattlers) 38–39 |
| 2024 | Arizona Rattlers | 11–5 | Won Round One (Knight Hawks) 39–38; Won WC Championship (Strike Force) 58–23; Won IFL National Championship (vs. Pirates) 53–16 |
| 2024 | San Diego Strike Force | 10–6 | Won Round One (at Panthers) 49–40; Lost WC Championship (at Rattlers) 23–58 |
| 2025 | Arizona Rattlers | 10-6 | Lost Round One (Strike Force) 49-48 |
| 2025 | San Diego Strike Force | 10-6 | Won Round One (Rattlers) 49-48; Lost WC Championship (Knight Hawks) 74-68 |
| 2025 | Vegas Knight Hawks | 10-6 | Won Round One (Panthers) 36-31; Won WC Championship (Strike Force) 74-68; Won IFL National Championship (Blizzard) 64-61 |
| 2026 | Vegas Knight Hawks | 12-4 | Lost Round One (Rattlers) 47-36 |
| 2026 | Arizona Rattlers | 11-5 | Won Round One (Knight Hawks) 47-36; Won WC Championship (Strike Force) 43-37; Won IFL National Championship (Blizzard) 62-51 |
| 2026 | Tucson Sugar Skulls | 7-9 | Lost Round One (Strike Force) 53-47 |

== Season results ==
| Denotes team that won the IFL National Championship |
| Denotes team that won the WC Championship, but lost the IFL National Championship |
| Denotes team that qualified for the IFL Playoffs |

| Season | Team (record) | | | | | | | |
| Season | 1st | 2nd | 3rd | 4th | 5th | 6th | 7th | 8th |
|---|---|---|---|---|---|---|---|---|
2022: The Western Conference was formed with seven inaugural members, the Arizona Rattlers, Bay Area Panthers, Duke City Gladiators, Northern Arizona Wranglers, San Diego Strike Force, Tucson Sugar Skulls, and the Vegas Knight Hawks.
| 2022 | Arizona (13–3) | Northern Arizona (12–4) | Tucson (9–7) | Duke City (8–8) | Vegas (6–10) | San Diego (3–13) | Bay Area (1–15) | —N/a |
| 2023 | Arizona (11–4) | Bay Area (10–5) | Tucson (9–6) | Northern Arizona (7–8) | San Diego (6–9) | Duke City (5–10) | Vegas (5–10) | —N/a |
2024: An expansion team, the San Antonio Gunslingers, joined the Western Conference.
| 2024 | Bay Area (13–3) | Vegas (11–5) | Arizona (11–5) | San Diego (10–6) | Northern Arizona (9–7) | San Antonio (8–8) | Duke City (3–13) | Tucson (2–14) |
2025: The Duke City Gladiators went dormant and left the Western Conference.
| 2025 | Bay Area (13–3) | Vegas (10–6) | San Diego (10–6) | Arizona (10–6) | Tucson (6–10) | San Antonio (5–11) | Northern Arizona (2–14) | —N/a |
2026: The Duke City Gladiators rejoined the Western Conference and rebranded to the New Mexico Chupacabras. The Bay Area Panthers went dormant and left the conference.
| 2026 | San Diego (13-3) | Vegas (12-4) | Arizona (11-5) | Tucson (7-9) | San Antonio (5-11) | Northern Arizona (3-13) | New Mexico (2-14) | —N/a |
2027: An expansion team, the Texas Draft, joined the conference and the Tulsa Oilers moved from the Eastern Conference to the Western Conference.
