= Fishers Freight =

Professional indoor football team based in Fishers, Indiana, US

- Current season
Logo

General information
- Founded: 2023
- Headquartered: Fishers, Indiana at the Fishers Event Center
- Colors: High Visibility Yellow, Steel Blue, and Black
- Website: fishersfreightfootball.com

Personnel
- Owners: Indiana Football Club LLC; Jim Hallett
- CEO: Jim Hallett
- General manager: Dixie Wooten
- Head coach: Dixie Wooten

Team history
- Fishers Freight (2025–present)

Home fields
- Fishers Event Center (2025–present)

League / conference affiliations
- Indoor Football League (2025–present): Eastern Conference (2025–present)

The Fishers Freight are a professional indoor football team based in the Indianapolis metropolitan area that competes in the Indoor Football League (IFL). The Freight began play in 2025 at the Fishers Event Center. They are owned by Jim Hallett, owner of the ECHL's Indy Fuel.

The Freight are the third arena/indoor football team to play in the Indianapolis area, following the Indiana Firebirds of the original Arena Football League (2001–2004) and the Indianapolis Enforcers of various leagues (2010–2012, 2018–2022).

== History ==
=== 2023–2024: Founding ===
In October 2023, the Indoor Football League officially announced a new expansion team for Indianapolis, Indiana to play in 2025. The team was awarded to owner Jim Hallett, owner of the East Coast Hockey League's Indy Fuel. On December 15, 2023, the team was officially named the Fishers Freight.

The Freight will join the Fuel and the Pro Volleyball Federation's new Indy Ignite in playing at the Fishers Event Center, owned by the city of Fishers.

== Season results ==
League champions	Conference champions	Playoff berth	League leader

Season	League	Conference	Regular season				Postseason results
Season	League	Conference	Finish	Wins	Losses	Ties	Postseason results
2026	IFL	Eastern	5th	8	8	0	
