= Johnny King (American football) =

American football player (born 1999)

Profile
- Position: Wide receiver

Personal information
- Born: September 29, 1999 (age 27); Lauderdale Lakes, Florida, U.S.
- Listed height: 6 ft 5 in (1.96 m)
- Listed weight: 209 lb (95 kg)

Career information
- High school: Boyd H. Anderson (Lauderdale Lakes, Florida)
- College: Northeastern Oklahoma A&M (2019); Southeast Missouri State (2020–2022)
- NFL draft: 2023: undrafted

Career history
- Indianapolis Colts (2023)*; Philadelphia Eagles (2023)*; Hamilton Tiger-Cats (2024)*
- * Offseason or practice squad member only

Awards and highlights
- First-team All-OVC (2022); Second-team All-OVC (2021)

Johnny King (born September 29, 1999) is an American professional football wide receiver. He played college football at Northeastern Oklahoma A&M and Southeast Missouri State.

== Professional career ==
Pre-draft measurables
Height	Weight	Arm length	Hand span	40-yard dash	10-yard split	20-yard split	20-yard shuttle	Three-cone drill	Vertical jump	Broad jump	Bench press
6 ft 4 1/2 in (1.94 m)	209 lb (95 kg)	34 7/8 in (0.89 m)	10 1/4 in (0.26 m)	4.57 s	1.57 s	2.65 s	4.38 s	7.09 s	31.0 in (0.79 m)	10 ft 3 in (3.12 m)	4 reps
All values from Pro Day

=== Indianapolis Colts ===
On May 5, 2023, the Indianapolis Colts signed King to a three-year, $2.70 million contract as an undrafted free agent. On August 2, 2023, King was waived by the Colts.

=== Philadelphia Eagles ===
On August 8, 2023, the Philadelphia Eagles signed King to a one-year, $750,000 contract. He was waived on August 29, 2023.

=== Hamilton Tiger-Cats ===
King signed with the Hamilton Tiger-Cats of the Canadian Football League (CFL) on January 23, 2024. He was released on May 28, 2024.
