= Northern Arizona Wranglers =

Professional indoor football team

- Current season
Logo

General information
- Founded: 2020; 6 years ago
- Headquartered: Prescott Valley, Arizona at the Findlay Toyota Center
- Colors: Red, royal blue, midnight blue, white, grey
- Mascot: Whiskie
- Website: nazwranglers.com

Personnel
- Owner: Dragon Sports LLC
- Head coach: Ron James
- President: Fred DePalma

Nickname
- NAZ

Team history
- Northern Arizona Wranglers (2021–present)

Home fields
- Findlay Toyota Center (2021–present)

League / conference affiliations
- Indoor Football League (2021–present): Western Conference (2022–present)

Championships
- League championships: 1: IFL National Championships (1) 2022
- Conference championships: 1: 2022

Playoff appearances (2)
- 2022, 2023

The Northern Arizona Wranglers are a professional indoor football team based in Prescott Valley, Arizona, that competes in the Indoor Football League (IFL). The team plays its home games at the Findlay Toyota Center. The Wranglers began play in the 2021 season.

== History ==
On August 25, 2020, the Indoor Football League (IFL) held a press conference at the Findlay Toyota Center to announce a new expansion team in Prescott Valley. The team is the third IFL franchise in the state of Arizona, along with the Arizona Rattlers and Tucson Sugar Skulls, for the 2021 season. They will be the third indoor football team to play in Prescott Valley. The Arizona Adrenaline played in the American Indoor Football Association before that in 2008 and also played in the IFL in 2011. The Arizona Outlaws played in the AIF in 2012.

The team hired Dominic Bramante as the inaugural head coach after previously serving in the same role with the Duke City Gladiators, winning the Champions Indoor Football title in 2018 and 2019. On October 6, 2020, the team name was announced as the Northern Arizona Wranglers.

Former Jacksonville Sharks and Iowa Barnstormers head coach Les Moss was named the head coach for the 2022 season.

The Wranglers won their first IFL National Championship in 2022, defeating the Quad City Steamwheelers 47–45.

On July 2, 2024, assistant coach David Moran died after he collapsed during the team's prior game against the San Diego Strike Force. The team held a memorial before their following home game against the Vegas Knight Hawks.

== Season-by-season results ==
League champions	Conference champions	Playoff berth	League leader

Season	League	Conference	Regular season				Postseason results
Season	League	Conference	Finish	Wins	Losses	Ties	Postseason results
2021	IFL		11th	1	13	0	
2022	IFL	Western	2nd	12	4	0	Won first round (Tucson) 49–30; Won semifinal (Arizona) 52–51; Won IFL National Championship (Quad City) 47–45
2023	IFL	Western	4th	7	8	0	Won first round (Arizona) 62–53; Lost semifinal (Bay Area) 46–68
2024	IFL	Western	5th	9	7	0	
2025	IFL	Western	7th	2	14	0	
2026	IFL	Western	6th	3	13	0	
Totals				34	59	0	All-time regular season record (2021–2026)
Totals				4	1	—	All-time postseason record (2021–2026)
Totals				38	60	0	All-time regular season and postseason record (2021–2026)
