= 2025 IFL National Championship =

Indoor football championship game

| Vegas Knight Hawks (4) (Western) (10-6) | Green Bay Blizzard (2) (Eastern) (10-6) |
|---|---|
| 64 | 61 |
| | 1 | 2 | 3 | 4 | Total |
|---|---|---|---|---|---|
| VGS | 13 | 22 | 14 | 15 | 64 |
| GB | 14 | 19 | 21 | 7 | 61 |
- Date: August 23, 2025
- Kickoff time: 9:30 p.m. CT
- Stadium: Tucson Arena; Tucson, Arizona
- MVP: Jayden de Laura
- Attendance: 3,251

TV in the United States
- Network: CBS Sports Network

The 2025 IFL National Championship was an indoor football championship game played to determine the champion of the Indoor Football League (IFL) for the 2025 season.

The game was played on August 23, 2025, in the Tucson Arena at the Tucson Convention Center in Tucson, Arizona. It was the first of a three-year partnership between the IFL and the Tucson Convention Center to hold the IFL National Championship in Tucson Arena. The game was televised in the United States by CBS Sports Network.
