= Tulsa Oilers (IFL) =

Professional indoor football team based in the United States

Logo

General information
- Founded: 2022
- Headquartered: Tulsa, Oklahoma at the BOK Center
- Colors: Oil black and gold
- Website: tulsaoilersfootball.com

Personnel
- Owners: NL Sports, LLC (Andy Scurto)
- Head coach: Marvin Jones

Team history
- Tulsa Oilers (2023–present)

Home fields
- BOK Center (2023–present)

League / conference affiliations
- Indoor Football League (2023–present): Eastern Conference (2023–2026); Western Conference (2027-present)

Playoff appearances (2)
- 2025, 2026

The Tulsa Oilers (branded as Tulsa Oilers Football) are a professional indoor football team based in Tulsa, Oklahoma, that competes in the Indoor Football League (IFL). The Oilers began play in 2023. The team plays its home games at BOK Center. The Oilers are owned by Andy Scurto, owner of the ECHL hockey franchise of the same name.

The Oilers are the third arena/indoor football team to play in Tulsa, following the Tulsa Talons of the af2 and Arena Football League (2000–2011) and the Oklahoma Defenders of the APFL and CPIFL (2012–2014).

== History ==
On July 26, 2022, Andy Scurto, owner of the Tulsa Oilers ECHL hockey team, announced that he had purchased an expansion franchise in the Indoor Football League set to begin play for the 2023 season. Although several fans had hoped for a return of the Tulsa Talons brand, Scurto stated that his preference was for the team to have an oil-related nickname.

On August 16, the five name-the-team contest finalists were announced, Bison, Crude, Oilers, Tornado, and Wildcatters. The Oilers name, logo and color scheme was announced on September 10. On September 14, 2022, the Oilers announced that Marvin Jones would serve as the team's first head coach.

The Oilers would make their first postseason appearance in 2025, after signing Sam Castronova, the longtime quarterback for the arena football team in Albany, midseason after Castronova had led Albany to a win in the Arena Football One championship. Castronova led the Oilers to three consecutive wins following his arrival from Albany to get the Oilers into the playoffs.

== Season results ==
League champions	Conference champions	Playoff berth	League leader

Season	League	Conference	Regular season				Postseason results
Season	League	Conference	Finish	Wins	Losses	Ties	Postseason results
2023	IFL	Eastern	7th	2	13	0	
2024	IFL	Eastern	5th	6	10	0	
2025	IFL	Eastern	3rd	10	6	0	Lost in Round 1 (Green Bay)
2026	IFL	Eastern	3rd	11	5	0	Lost in Eastern Conference Championship (Green Bay)

== Head coaches ==
Note: Statistics are correct as of the 2022 Indoor Football League season.

Head coach	Season	Regular season				Playoffs		Awards
Head coach	Season	W	L	T	Win%	W	L	Awards
Marvin Jones	2023	2	13	0	.133	0	0	

== Notable players ==
See Category:Tulsa Oilers (IFL) players
