= Findlay Toyota Center =

Multi-purpose arena in Prescott Valley, Arizona

Coordinates: 34.589242°N 112.336361°W

- Location within Arizona Location within the United States
- Former names: Tim's Toyota Center (2007–2014); Prescott Valley Convention & Events Center (2006–2007; 2014–2019)
- Address: 3201 North Main Street; Prescott Valley; United States
- Location: Prescott Valley, Arizona
- Owner: Town of Prescott Valley
- Operator: Oak View Group
- Capacity: 6,200 (concerts); 5,100 (basketball); 4,810 (ice hockey)
- Surface: Multi-surface

Construction
- Groundbreaking: August 23, 2005
- Opened: November 6, 2006
- Cost: $36 million ($57.5 million in 2025 dollars)
- Architect: Sink Combs Dethlefs
- Project manager: International Coliseums Company
- Structural engineers: Martin/Martin, Inc.
- Services engineers: M-E Engineers, Inc.
- General contractor: Hunt Construction Group

Tenants
- Arizona Sundogs (CHL) (2006–2014); Arizona Adrenaline (AIFA/IFL) (2008, 2011); Arizona Outlaws (AIF) (2012); Northern Arizona Suns (NBA G League) (2016–2020); Northern Arizona Wranglers (IFL) (2021–present)

Website
- https://findlaytoyotacenter.com

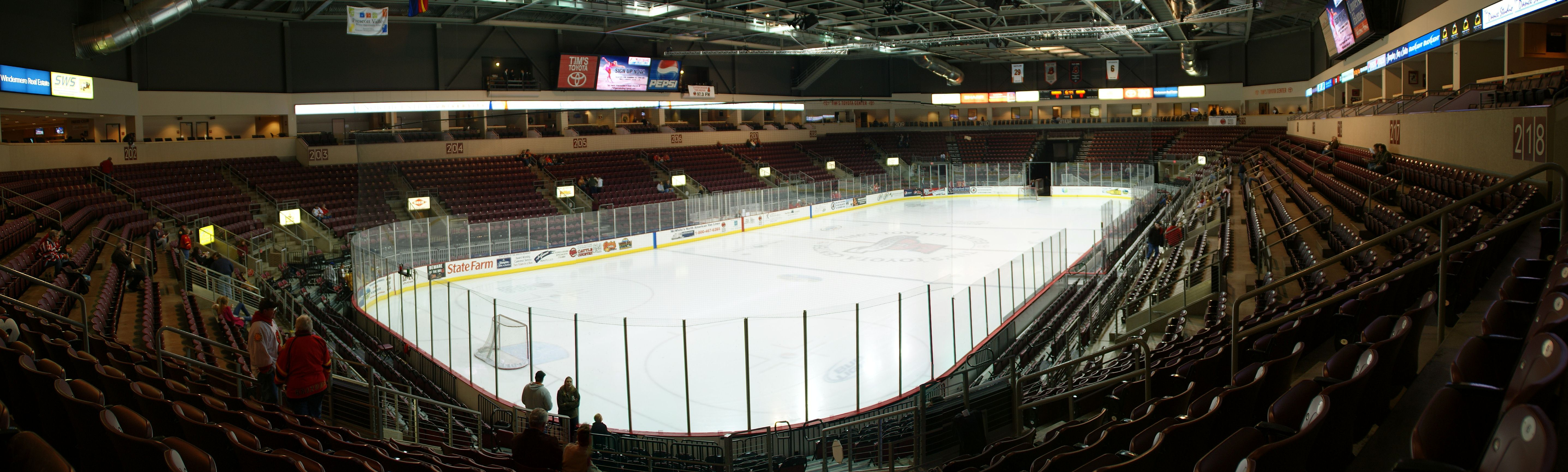
Tim's Toyota Center before an Arizona Sundogs hockey game

The Findlay Toyota Center (formerly Tim's Toyota Center and originally built as the Prescott Valley Convention & Events Center) is a 5,100-seat multi-purpose arena located at 3201 North Main Street in Prescott Valley, Arizona.

Since opening in November 2006, it is home to a variety of Arizona Interscholastic Association basketball and wrestling competitions; for instance, in 2011, it hosted the 1A and 2A Conference semifinal and finals games and the 3A Conference quarterfinals. It has also hosted a few monster truck shows.

The arena hosted the American Indoor Football's Arizona Outlaws in 2012 and the Central Hockey League's Arizona Sundogs from 2006 to 2014.

Tim's Toyota, a Toyota dealership in Prescott with used car lots in Prescott Valley and Chino Valley, paid an undisclosed sum to be the corporate sponsor and namesake of the arena. That deal expired on September 30, 2014, with the arena reverting to the Prescott Valley Event Center name.

On January 3, 2019, Findlay Toyota Prescott (formally Tim's Toyota) acquired the naming rights to the center for an undisclosed sum.

== Features ==
Among its amenities are 24 luxury suites (including two party suites), 400 club seats and parking for 3,000 cars. The arena accommodates up to 6,200 for concerts.

== Events ==
The venue has hosted well-known bands such as Toby Keith, Cody Johnson, Miranda Lambert, Chicago, Godsmack, Breaking Benjamin, Three Doors Down, and ZZ Top. It hosted its first-ever WWE event on July 29, 2007.

The venue hosted a college basketball game on November 30, 2011, when Brigham Young University faced Northern Arizona.

On April 11, 2016, it was announced that the Phoenix Suns would own their affiliate in the NBA Development League, the Northern Arizona Suns, after the purchasing the Bakersfield Jam, relocating the team from Bakersfield, California, to Prescott Valley for the 2016–17 season. Following the pandemic-shorted 2019–20 season, the Phoenix Suns announced that the Northern Arizona Suns would relocate to the metro Phoenix area for the following season. However, the Northern Arizona Suns withdrew from the 2020–21 NBA G League season entirely due to the COVID-19 pandemic before ultimately moving to the Wayne State Fieldhouse the following season under the G League team's sale to the Detroit Pistons to become the Motor City Cruise. The Phoenix Suns would later acquire a new NBA G League team in 2024, though this one would be named the Valley Suns instead, with its location being closer to Phoenix through the city of Tempe, Arizona.

In 2021, the Indoor Football League would expand their operations to host a third team in the state of Arizona (after previously having success with former Arena Football League's Arizona Rattlers team joining their league and then expanding to southern Arizona with the Tucson Sugar Skulls not long afterward), with the Northern Arizona Wranglers being announced as the third team for the IFL. The Wranglers would enlist the Findley Toyota Center as their home arena for games starting with their inaugural season in 2021. After starting their inaugural season with an awful 1–13 record (winning their only game against the south side rivals in Tucson), the Wranglers would see a dramatic change in results the following season afterward, going 12–2 for a second place finish in their conference (behind the rivaling Rattlers) and then crushing the Duke City Gladiators before winning close matches against the rivaling Rattlers and Quad City Steamwheelers to become IFL champions in only their second season of existence.

== See also ==
- List of sports venues with the name Toyota
