= Fishers Event Center =

Indoor arena in Fishers, Indiana, US

- Interactive map of Fishers Event Center
- Full name: Fishers Event Center
- Address: 11000 Stockdale Street
- Location: Fishers, Indiana, U.S.
- Coordinates: 39°56′54″N 86°0′19″W
- Owner: City of Fishers
- Operator: ASM Global
- Capacity: 7,500

Construction
- Groundbreaking: March 24, 2023
- Opened: November 22, 2024
- Cost: $170 million
- Architect: SCI Architects
- Project manager: Thompson Thrift
- General contractor: AECOM Hunt

Tenants
- Indy Fuel (ECHL) (2024–present); Fishers Freight (IFL) (2025–present); Indy Ignite (PVF/MLV) (2025–present)

Website
- fisherseventcenter.com

The Fishers Event Center is an arena in Fishers, Indiana. It is owned by the City of Fishers. The arena is the new home of the Indy Fuel of the ECHL.

As well as the Fuel, Fishers Event Center hosts the Indy Ignite of Major League Volleyball, the Fishers Freight of the Indoor Football League, concerts, and high school graduations.

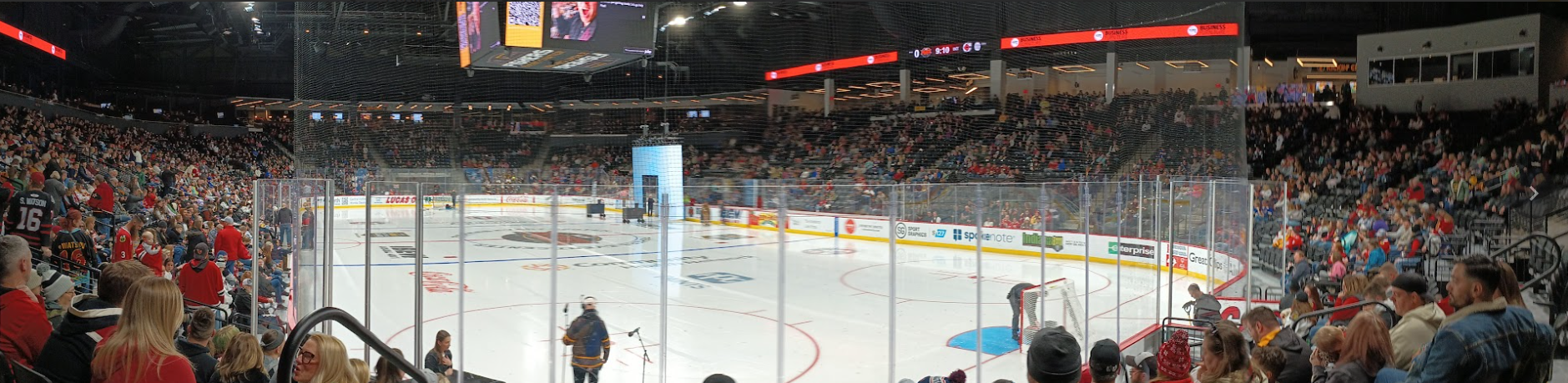
Inside of the arena before a game between the Fuel and Cincinnati Cyclones, January 18, 2025.

== Arena Usage ==
=== Sports ===
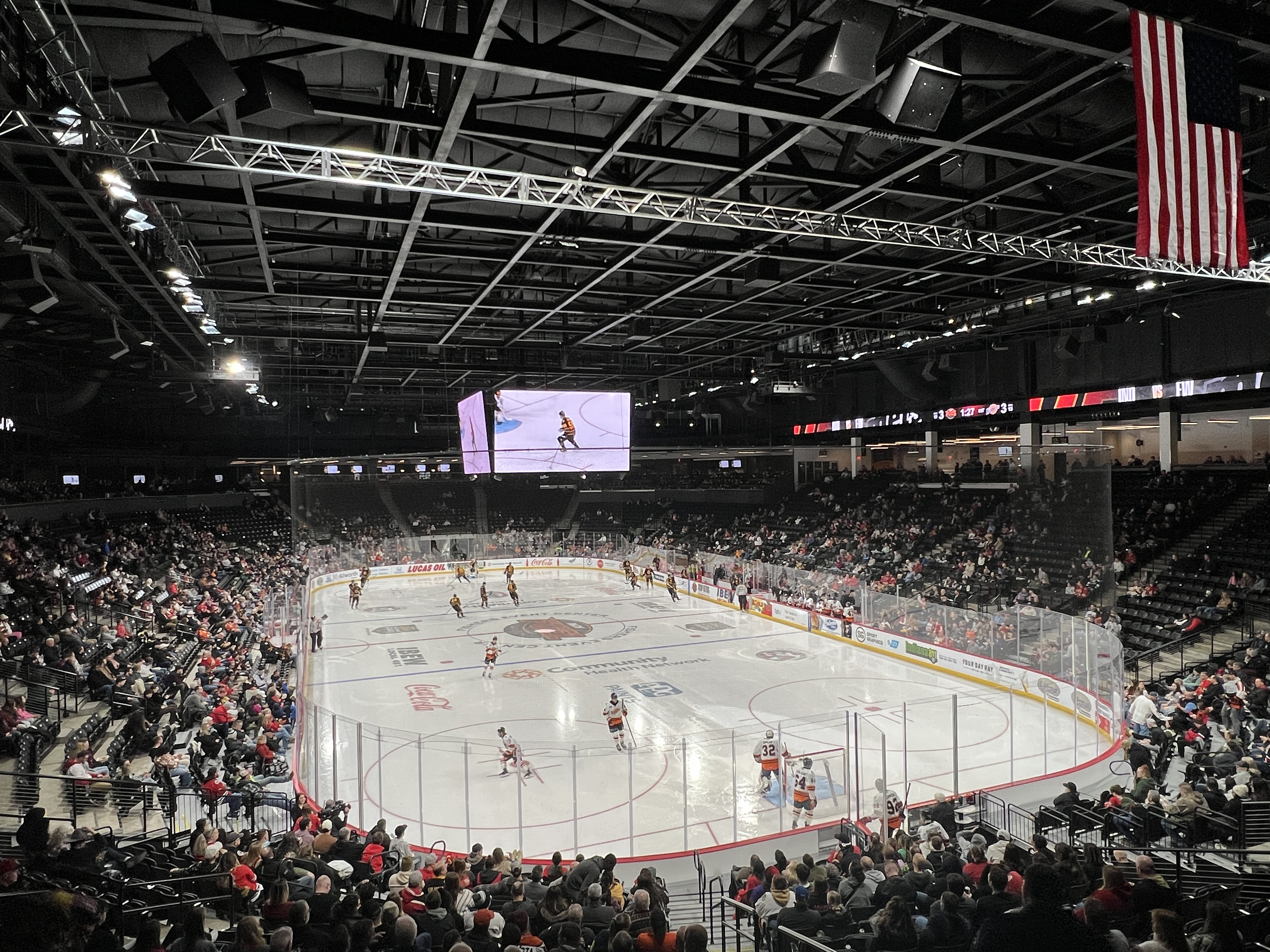
Fishers Event Center during an Indy Fuel game

The arena serves as the home of the Indy Fuel, a minor league hockey team in the ECHL as well as the Fishers Freight of the Indoor Football League who first begin play in 2025.

On December 20, 2025, Real American Freestyle presented RAF 04 from the arena, an event that was broadcast live on Fox Nation.

=== Other events ===
Fishers Event Center will host concerts, shows, graduations, and other community events. The arena is part of a $650 million facility that includes apartments, office space, a hotel, a restaurant, and retail space.

== See also ==
- List of indoor arenas in the United States
- List of music venues in the United States
