= Quad City Steamwheelers (2018) =

American indoor football team

- Current season
Logo

General information
- Founded: 2017
- Headquartered: Vibrant Arena at The MARK in Moline, Illinois
- Colors: Navy blue, gold and scarlet red
- Website: steamwheelersfootball.com

Personnel
- Owner: Doug Bland
- General manager: Destiny Brown
- Head coach: Cory Ross

Team history
- Quad City Steamwheelers (2018–present)

Home fields
- Vibrant Arena at The MARK (2018–present)

League / conference affiliations
- Champions Indoor Football (2018); North Conference (2018); Indoor Football League (2019–present); Eastern Conference (2022–present)

Championships
- Conference championships: 1: 2022
- Division championships: 1: 2025

Playoff appearances (5)
- 2018, 2022, 2023, 2024, 2025

The Quad City Steamwheelers are a professional indoor football team based in Moline, Illinois, that competes in the Indoor Football League (IFL). They played their first season as part of the Champions Indoor Football, and then joined the IFL prior to their second season. The team plays its home games at the Vibrant Arena at The MARK. The team announced it would be dormant for the 2021 season due to the arena capacity restrictions caused by the COVID-19 pandemic, but returned to play in 2022.

The Steamwheelers are named after the Quad Cities' previous team of the same name, which played in all ten of the AF2's seasons (2000–2009) and won the first two ArenaCups.

== History ==
Initial CIF/IFL Logo (2018-2021)

After the original Quad City Steamwheelers folded along with the AF2, TaxSlayer Center director Scott Mullen had been in talks with various investors seeking to bring back the Steamwheelers, but none were financially secure enough to meet his standards. During 2017, a splash page emerged allegedly belonging to a revived Steamwheelers team in the CIF, however, neither Mullen nor the CIF would comment on the page.

On August 15, 2017, the Center confirmed that a deal had been reached which would see the Wheelers return as members of the CIF for 2018, with a press conference taking place the following day. At the press conference, the Wheelers introduced their owner/general manager Doug Bland (previously part-owner of fellow CIF team the Dallas Marshals) and head coach Cory Ross (most recently head coach for the Omaha Beef).

After one season in the CIF, the Steamwheelers announced they were joining the Indoor Football League for the 2019 season.

Helmet Logo

After playing only one game in 2020, the Steamwheelers' season was initially postponed and the league's season was eventually cancelled due to the COVID-19 pandemic. On October 23, 2020, the team announced that due to the restrictions on arena capacity during the pandemic, they would be dormant for at least the 2021 season. In September 2021, they announced they planned to return for the 2022 season.

== Season-by-season results ==
League champions	Conference champions	Division champions	Playoff berth	League leader

Season	League	Conference	Division	Regular season				Postseason results
Season	League	Conference	Division	Finish	Wins	Losses	Ties	Postseason results
2018	CIF	North		3rd	8	4	0	Lost Conference Semifinal (Sioux City) 46–54
2019	IFL			7th	6	8	0	
2020	IFL			—	1	0	0	Season cancelled due to the COVID-19 pandemic
2021	IFL			—	0	0	0	Season cancelled due to the COVID-19 pandemic
2022	IFL	Eastern		3rd	9	7	0	Won First Round (Massachusetts Pirates) 39–38; Won Second Round (Frisco Fighters) 48–41; Lost Championship (Northern Arizona) 45–47
2023	IFL	Eastern		4th	9	6	0	Lost First Round (Frisco Fighters) 29–57
2024	IFL	Eastern		4th	8	8	0	Lost First Round (Green Bay Blizzard) 23–34
2025	IFL	Eastern		1st	11	5	0	Won First Round (Jacksonville Sharks) 57–41; Lost Second Round (Green Bay Blizzard) 64–71
2026	IFL	Eastern		6th	5	11	0	
Totals					57	49	0	All-time regular season record (2018–2026)
Totals					3	5	—	All-time postseason record (2018–2026)
Totals					60	54	0	All-time regular season and postseason record (2018–2026)

== Notable players ==
See Category:Quad City Steamwheelers (2018–) players
