= Vegas Knight Hawks =

Professional indoor football team based in the United States

- Current season
Logo

General information
- Founded: 2021
- Headquartered: Henderson, Nevada at Lee's Family Forum
- Colors: Black, red, gold, and white
- Mascot: Risk
- Website: knighthawksfootball.com

Personnel
- Owner: Bill Foley
- Head coach: Mike Davis

Team history
- Vegas Knight Hawks (2022–present)

Home fields
- Lee's Family Forum (2022–present)

League / conference affiliations
- Indoor Football League (2022–present): Western Conference (2022-present)

Championships
- League championships: 1: IFL National Championships (1) 2025
- Conference championships: 1: 2025

Playoff appearances (3)
- 2024, 2025, 2026

The Vegas Knight Hawks are a professional indoor football team based in the Las Vegas metropolitan area that competes in the Indoor Football League (IFL). The Knight Hawks began play in 2022 at Lee's Family Forum. The franchise is owned by Bill Foley, the owner of the Vegas Golden Knights.

The Knight Hawks are the fourth football team to play in the Las Vegas metropolitan area following the arrival of the National Football League's Las Vegas Raiders, the XFL Las Vegas Outlaws, and the Canadian Football League's Las Vegas Posse, as well as being the fourth arena/indoor football team to play in Vegas following the defunct Las Vegas Sting, Las Vegas Gladiators, and Las Vegas Outlaws, all from the Arena Football League.

== History ==
In May 2021, the Indoor Football League (IFL) announced that Bill Foley, owner of the National Hockey League's Vegas Golden Knights, and Chuck Brennan, the founder and CEO of the then-Dollar Loan Center (now Lee's Family Forum), had purchased an IFL franchise to compete at the new Dollar Loan Center in Henderson, Nevada. The Dollar Loan Center was built to be the home of the Golden Knights' American Hockey League affiliate, the Henderson Silver Knights, with an expected completion in early 2022. On August 23, 2021, the team announced their name and logo, as well as introducing former Nebraska Danger head coach Mike Davis as the team's first head coach.

In Davis’ 3rd season as head coach, the Knighthawks achieved their 1st winning season, as well as clinched their 1st appearance in the Indoor Football League Playoffs, where they would fall in the 1st round to the Arizona Rattlers. The following season, the Knighthawks would again achieve a winning season, however in the playoffs, the Knighthawks would go all the way, achieving their 1st ever playoff win in the 1st round against the Bay Area Panthers, winning the Western Conference Championship against the San Diego Strike Force, before ultimately winning the IFL National Championship for the 1st time in franchise history over the Green Bay Blizzard on August 23, 2025.

== Season-by-season results ==
League champions	Conference champions	Playoff berth	League leader

Season	League	Conference	Regular season			Postseason results
Season	League	Conference	Finish	Wins	Losses	Postseason results
2022	IFL	Western	5th	6	10	
2023	IFL	Western	6th	5	10	
2024	IFL	Western	2nd	11	5	Lost First round (Arizona) 38–39
2025	IFL	Western	4th	10	6	Won League Championship (Green Bay) 64-61
2026	IFL	Western	2nd	12	4	Lost First round (Arizona) 36–47
Totals				44	35	All-time regular season record
Totals				3	2	All-time postseason record
Totals				47	37	All-time regular season and postseason record

== Head coaches ==
Note: Statistics are correct as of the 2025 Indoor Football League season.

Name	Season	Regular season				Playoffs		Awards
Name	Season	W	L	T	Win%	W	L	Awards
Mike Davis	2022	6	10	0	.375	0	0	
Mike Davis	2023	5	10	0	.333	0	0	
Mike Davis	2024	11	5	0	.688	0	1	
Mike Davis	2025	10	6	0	.625	3	0	IFL Champions

== Notable players ==
See Category:Vegas Knight Hawks players
