= Tucson Sugar Skulls =

Indoor Football League team in Tucson, Arizona

- Current season
Logo

General information
- Founded: 2018
- Headquartered: Tucson Arena in Tucson, Arizona
- Colors: Black, gold, red, white
- Mascot: Bones
- Website: tucsonsugarskulls.com

Personnel
- Owners: Edmund Marquez; Ali Farhang
- Head coach: Rayshaun Kizer
- President: Edmund Marquez

Team history
- Tucson Sugar Skulls (2019–present)

Home fields
- Tucson Arena (2019–present)

League / conference affiliations
- Indoor Football League (2019–present): Western Conference (2022–present)

Playoff appearances (4)
- 2019, 2022, 2023, 2026

The Tucson Sugar Skulls are a professional indoor football team based in Tucson, Arizona, that competes in the Indoor Football League (IFL). The Sugar Skulls began play in the 2019 season as an expansion team. The team plays its home games at Tucson Convention Center's Tucson Arena. The franchise is led by owners Edmund Marquez and Ali Farhang.

== History ==
The franchise was announced by the ownership group led by Kevin and Cathy Guy at a press conference held on August 23, 2018, at the Tucson Convention Center. As Kevin Guy was also the head coach of the Arizona Rattlers, Cathy was named the majority owner of the Tucson team to oversee primary operations along with Mike Feder and Ali Farhang. The team announced Marcus Coleman as its first head coach on September 12, 2018. The team name was revealed on September 20, 2018, after a name-the-team contest originating from the local tradition of creating sugar skulls for Día de Muertos (Day of the Dead) and the Roman Catholic holiday of All Souls Day.

The team qualified for the playoffs in their first season with a 7–7 record. They lost to the eventual league champion Sioux Falls Storm 50–47 in the first round. After the season, the Sugar Skulls hired two-time IFL coach of the year Dixie Wooten away from the Iowa Barnstormers as head coach and general manager for the 2020 season. However, the season was cancelled due to the COVID-19 pandemic before the Sugar Skulls played any games.

In October 2025, the Tucson Sugar Skulls indoor football franchise was acquired by a group of Tucson investors led by community leader-businessman Edmund Marquez, and attorney-sports booster Ali Farhang.

The sale — approved by the Indoor Football League (IFL) — became effective on October 13, 2025. Under the new ownership, Marquez serves as team president and holds a 25% ownership stake.

Farhang, who had been a minority owner and the team’s general counsel since its founding, increased his stake to 20%. Other minority investors — including former majority owners Kevin Guy and Cathy Guy — now each hold smaller minority shares (approximately 5% each).

As part of the reorganization, the team offices were relocated from the Kino Sports Complex to a building at 2719 N. Campbell Avenue owned by Marquez.

== Statistics ==
=== Season-by-season results ===
League champions	Playoff berth	League leader

Season	League	Conference	Regular season				Postseason results
Season	League	Conference	Finish	Wins	Losses	Ties	Postseason results
2019	IFL		6th	7	7	0	Lost first round (Sioux Falls) 47–50
2020	IFL	Season cancelled due to COVID-19 pandemic					
2021	IFL		9th	6	8	0	
2022	IFL	Western	3rd	9	7	0	Lost first round (Northern Arizona) 30–49
2023	IFL	Western	3rd	9	6	0	Lost first round (Bay Area) 46–34
2024	IFL	Western	8th	2	14	0	
2025	IFL	Western	5th	6	10	0	
2026	IFL	Western	4th	7	9	0	Lost first round (San Diego) 54–47
Totals				46	61	0	All-time regular season record (2019–2026)
Totals				0	4	0	All-time postseason record (2019–2026)
Totals				46	65	0	All-time regular season and postseason record (2019–2026)

=== Head coaches ===
Note: Statistics are correct through the 2022 IFL season.

Name	Term	Regular season			Playoffs		Awards
Name	Term	W	L	Win%	W	L	Awards
Marcus Coleman	2019	7	7	.500	0	1	
Dixie Wooten	2020–2022	15	15	.500	0	1	
Hurtis Chinn	2023	9	6	.600	0	1	
Billy Back	2024–2025	8	24	.250	0	0	
