= 2020 Indoor Football League season =

2020 IFL season
- League: Indoor Football League
- Sport: Indoor football
- Duration: Scheduled; March 7 – July 25
- Teams: 13

IFL seasons
- ← 2019 2021 →

The 2020 Indoor Football League season was the twelfth season of the Indoor Football League (IFL) and the first season of being the top indoor football league, after the folding of the Arena Football League. The league was set to play the season with thirteen teams, up from ten the previous season, by adding three expansion teams, one team from Champions Indoor Football, and one team folding.

After playing two games, the season was initially postponed on March 12 due to social distancing measures closing venues during the COVID-19 pandemic. On April 13, the league cancelled the rest of the season due to the uncertainty that they would be able to play in any venues in the near future.

== Offseason ==
On August 20, 2019, the Duke City Gladiators joined the IFL after winning back-to-back CIF championships. On September 10, the Oakland Panthers, co-owned by NFL running back Marshawn Lynch, joined the IFL for the 2020 season. On November 1, the league added the Spokane Shock after it was resurrected by former NFL player Sam Adams, with the Spokane team reacquiring the Shock brand following the Spokane Empire's folding in 2017. The Bosselman family were looking to sell the Nebraska Danger, but no owner was found before the deadline for participating in the 2020 season. On November 24, 2019, the IFL added a thirteenth team in Frisco, Texas, owned by the Germain family called the Frisco Fighters. The Germain family also purchased the sponsorship rights for the IFL, the management rights of the league's communications and marketing department, as well as a second expansion for the 2021 season in Columbus, Ohio.

== Teams ==
Team	Location	Arena	Capacity	Founded	Joined	Head coach
Arizona Rattlers	Glendale, Arizona	Gila River Arena	17,125	1992	2017	Kevin Guy
Bismarck Bucks	Bismarck, North Dakota	Bismarck Event Center	10,100	2017	2019	Rod Miller
Cedar Rapids River Kings	Cedar Rapids, Iowa	U.S. Cellular Center	5,700	2011	2012	Victor Mann
Duke City Gladiators	Albuquerque, New Mexico	Tingley Coliseum	9,286	2015	2020	Pig Brown
Frisco Fighters	Frisco, Texas	Comerica Center	3,500	2019	2020	Clint Dolezel
Green Bay Blizzard	Green Bay, Wisconsin	Resch Center	8,599	2003	2010	Corey Roberson
Iowa Barnstormers	Des Moines, Iowa	Wells Fargo Arena	15,181	1995	2015	Ameer Ismail
Oakland Panthers	Oakland, California	Oakland Arena	19,596	2019	2020	Kurt Bryan
Quad City Steamwheelers	Moline, Illinois	TaxSlayer Center	9,200	2017	2019	Cory Ross
San Diego Strike Force	San Diego, California	Pechanga Arena	12,000	2018	2019	Burt Grossman
Sioux Falls Storm	Sioux Falls, South Dakota	Denny Sanford Premier Center	10,678	2000	2009	Kurtiss Riggs
Spokane Shock	Spokane, Washington	Spokane Veterans Memorial Arena	10,771	2006	2020	Billy Back
Tucson Sugar Skulls	Tucson, Arizona	Tucson Convention Center	8,962	2018	2019	Dixie Wooten

== Standings ==
The season began on March 7, 2020, and the league played two games before postponing the season due to the COVID-19 pandemic.

2020 Indoor Football League
	W	L	PCT	PF	PA	GB
Quad City Steamwheelers	1	0	1.000	54	39	—
San Diego Strike Force	1	0	1.000	50	36	—
Arizona Rattlers	0	0	–	0	0	0.5
Duke City Gladiators	0	0	–	0	0	0.5
Frisco Fighters	0	0	–	0	0	0.5
Green Bay Blizzard	0	0	–	0	0	0.5
Iowa Barnstormers	0	0	–	0	0	0.5
Oakland Panthers	0	0	–	0	0	0.5
Sioux Falls Storm	0	0	–	0	0	0.5
Spokane Shock	0	0	–	0	0	0.5
Tucson Sugar Skulls	0	0	–	0	0	0.5
Bismarck Bucks	0	1	.000	36	50	1
Cedar Rapids River Kings	0	1	.000	39	54	1

y – clinched regular season title

x – clinched playoff spot

Last updated: March 18, 2020

== Playoffs ==
The top eight teams would have made the IFL playoffs, with the quarterfinals consisting of the top seed hosting the eighth seed, the second seed hosting the seventh seed, the third seed hosting the sixth seed, and the fourth hosting the fifth seed. In the semifinals, the highest remaining seed would host the lower remaining seed and the next-highest hosts the next-lowest from the quarterfinals. The semifinal winners were to meet in the 2020 United Bowl on the weekend of July 25.
