= San Diego Strike Force =

Indoor Football League team in San Diego, California

- Current season
Logo

General information
- Founded: 2018
- Headquartered: Oceanside, California at Frontwave Arena
- Colors: Flight suit green, stealth black, yellow, white
- Website: sdstrikeforce.com

Personnel
- General manager: Geno Gerbo
- Head coach: Taylor Genuser
- President: Burt Grossman

Team history
- San Diego Strike Force (2019–present)

Home fields
- Pechanga Arena (2019–2024); Frontwave Arena (2025–present)

League / conference affiliations
- Indoor Football League (2019–present): Western Conference (2022–present)

Championships
- Division championships: 1: 2026

Playoff appearances (3)
- 2024, 2025, 2026

The San Diego Strike Force are a professional indoor football team based in San Diego County, California, that competes in the Indoor Football League (IFL). The team plays its home games at Frontwave Arena. The Strike Force began play in the 2019 season.

== History ==
The team was initially announced as a 2019 Indoor Football League expansion team in November 2018 and was owned by Roy Choi, who was also the owner of the IFL's Cedar Rapids River Kings. The team announced their colors as black, navy blue, silver, as well as their initial staff on December 17, 2018. Brian Cox, a former sports agent and quarterback, was hired as the general manager, while ex-Chargers defensive end Burt Grossman was named head coach.

The Strike Force are the second professional football team in San Diego that began play in spring 2019, after the San Diego Fleet of the Alliance of American Football, more than a year after the departure of the NFL's San Diego Chargers in 2017.

The Strike Force is the third indoor team to play in San Diego, after the San Diego Riptide of AF2 (2002–2005) and the San Diego Shockwave of the National Indoor Football League (2007). The team may have planned on being called the San Diego Lightning, as the organization's original email addresses and internal website links used that name.

The Strike Force struggled throughout its inaugural season with Grossman remarking the games were like he was "Southwestern College going to play Clemson or something." In their season opener against the Quad City Steamwheelers, they allowed 43 points in the first half and lost 67–49; Grossman attributed the team's struggles to a lack of headsets for the coaches. He eventually fired the defensive coordinator and released four players on defense; the offensive coordinator had also been fired two weeks prior, though Grossman noted both coaches were on the staff prior to his arrival. The Strike Force's first home game, a 65–44 defeat by the Tucson Sugar Skulls, saw a poor playing field consisting of carpet pieces held together with duct tape; four additional players were released a day later. After a 0–3 start, owner Choi brought in the River Kings' general manager Ryan Eucker to replace Cox. The team finished the season with a 1–13 record and last place in the league; their lone win was a 40–34 victory over the River Kings.

Following the 2019 season, Eucker announced the team would undergo a minor rebrand with a new logos and colors, choosing more military tones in olive green, black, silver, and brass to better represent the city. After playing one game, a 50–36 win over the Bismarck Bucks, the rest of the 2020 season was canceled due to the onset of the COVID-19 pandemic.

The Strike Force also withdrew from the 2021 season due to continued pandemic restrictions in California. During the hiatus, Eucker left the team and was replaced by football operations director Geno Gerbo as interim general manager by April 2021. In May 2021, Vivian Lin was announced as the team president and claimed to be the first Asian American woman to be a president of a professional football team.

By November 2021, Gerbo had left the organization and Todd Durkin was named general manager. while Grossman was replaced as head coach by former Christian High School athletic director and football offensive coordinator, David Beezer. In March 2022, it was announced that the team had been sold to a new group of local investors, with Vivian Lin as the controlling owner, when Choi no longer wanted to be the owner. However, by December 2022, Lin was no longer listed on the team website and former coach Burt Grossman was listed as team president. Gerbo also returned as the General Manager in guiding the team back to relevance in 2023 and 2024 - where the Strike Force made the playoffs as the #4 seed, and beat the #1 seed Bay Area Panthers in the first playoff game in Strike Force history.

On October 1, 2024, the IFL and the Strike Force announced a three-year partnership with Frontwave Arena in nearby Oceanside, California; the team will play home games in the arena starting with the 2025 season.

== Season-by-season results ==
League champions	Conference champions	Playoff berth	League leader

Season	League	Conference	Regular season			Postseason results
Season	League	Conference	Finish	Wins	Losses	Postseason results
2019	IFL		10th	1	13	
2020	IFL			1	0	Season cancelled due to the COVID-19 pandemic
2021	IFL	Dormant year				
2022	IFL	Western	6th	3	13	
2023	IFL	Western	5th	6	9	
2024	IFL	Western	4th	10	6	Won First round (Bay Area) 49–40; Lost Western Conference Championship (Arizona) 58–23
2025	IFL	Western	3rd	10	6	Won First round (Arizona) 49–48; Lost Western Conference Championship (Vegas) 74–68
2026	IFL	Western	1st	13	3	Won First round (Tucson) 54–47; Lost Western Conference Championship (Arizona) 43–37
Totals				44	50	All-time regular season record
Totals				3	3	All-time postseason record
Totals				47	53	All-time regular season and postseason record

== Notable players ==
See Category:San Diego Strike Force players
