= Bay Area Panthers =

Arena football team in San Jose, California

- Current season
Logo

General information
- Founded: 2019
- Headquartered: San Jose, California at the SAP Center
- Colors: Black, gold and white
- BayAreaPanthers.com

Personnel
- Owners: Marshawn Lynch and Roy Choi
- Head coach: Rob Keefe
- President: David Eisenberg

Team history
- Oakland Panthers (2020–2021); Bay Area Panthers (2022–present)

Home fields
- Oakland Arena (2020, never played); SAP Center (2022–present)

League / conference affiliations
- Indoor Football League (2020–present): Western Conference (2022-present)

Championships
- League championships: 1: IFL National Championships (1) 2023
- Conference championships: 1: 2023
- Division championships: 2: 2024, 2025

Playoff appearances (3)
- 2023, 2024, 2025

The Bay Area Panthers are a professional indoor football team based in San Jose, California, that competes in the Indoor Football League (IFL). The team was to begin play in 2020 at Oakland Arena as the Oakland Panthers. Due to the onset of the COVID-19 pandemic, the Panthers' inaugural season was canceled, and the team withdrew from the following 2021 season. Prior to the 2022 season, the Panthers announced they would instead play their home games at SAP Center in San Jose and were renamed after the Bay Area.

The Panthers are co-owned by Oakland native and NFL All-Pro running back Marshawn Lynch, and by Roy Choi, who previously owned the IFL's Cedar Rapids River Kings and San Diego Strike Force. The Panthers are the Bay Area's first arena/indoor football team since the San Jose SaberCats, who played in the Arena Football League from 1995 until 2008, and again from 2011 until 2015, winning four ArenaBowl championships.

== History ==
Oakland Panthers original logo

With the scheduled departure of the National Football League's Oakland Raiders relocation to Las Vegas in 2020 and the Golden State Warriors move to San Francisco in the 2019–20 season, on April 17, 2019, it was first reported that Roy Choi was in talks to bring an expansion Indoor Football League (IFL) team to Oakland for the 2020 season. Choi had previously purchased the Cedar Rapids River Kings and launched the expansion San Diego Strike Force in the IFL. The Panthers were officially announced as an IFL expansion team on September 10, 2019, along with their logo, color scheme, and coaching staff by co-owners Roy Choi and former NFL All-Pro running back Marshawn Lynch. The team planned to play out the Warriors' former home, the Oakland Arena. The Panthers' name references the indigenous Bay Area cougar, Oakland's involvement in the rise of the Black Panther Party in the 1960s, and the blockbuster Oscar-winning Marvel Studios movie Black Panther, directed by Oakland native Ryan Coogler. A team of the same name had originally been announced to play in the proposed Freedom Football League in December 2018, though no news had come from that league after the initial announcement. Because of the rising cost of living in the Bay Area, the Panthers stated they would provide lodging and meals to their players in addition to their regular salary. The team hired Kurt Bryan, best known for devising the A-11 offense, as their inaugural head coach.

However, the 2020 IFL season was curtailed in the midst of the COVID-19 pandemic before the Panthers could play a game. After initially announcing it would return in 2021, the team subsequently also withdrew from the 2021 season due to the on-going restrictions during the pandemic. On August 16, 2021, the team held a press conference to announce it would not play in Oakland, instead relocating to the SAP Center in San Jose, California, as the Bay Area Panthers without ever playing a game in Oakland.

The Panthers went 1-15 their inaugural season (2022), losing their last 15 games in a row. However in their second season on August 5, 2023, they beat the Sioux Falls Storm by a score of 51-41 to win their first IFL National Championship at the Dollar Loan Center. Quarterback Dalton Sneed of the Bay Area Panthers was named the game’s MVP. The team went dormant for 2026 and planned to return but when the divisions were announced they were not included and they were considered folded.

== Season-by-season results ==
League champions	Conference champions	Playoff berth	League leader

Season	League	Conference	Regular season			Postseason results
Season	League	Conference	Finish	Wins	Losses	Postseason results
2020	IFL	Season cancelled due to the COVID-19 pandemic				
2021	IFL	Dormant year				
2022	IFL	Western	7th	1	15	
2023	IFL	Western	2nd	10	5	Won First Round (Tucson) 46–34; Won Western Conference Championship (Northern Arizona) 68–46; Won 2023 United Bowl (Sioux Falls) 51–41
2024	IFL	Western	1st	13	3	Lost First Round (San Diego) 49–40
2025	IFL	Western	1st	13	3	Lost First Round (Vegas) 36–31
2026	IFL	Dormant year				
Totals				37	26	All-time regular season record
Totals				3	2	All-time postseason record
Totals				40	28	All-time regular season and postseason record

== Broadcasting ==
On February 27, 2020, it was announced that the radio home of the team would be KNBR AM 1050 out of San Mateo. KPYX broadcasts all home games on television. Dave Lewis is the play by play voice on the television broadcasts with Steve Papin or Aaron Garcia on color commentary. Lewis also calls the games on radio.
