= Justin Rankin =

American gridiron football player (born 1997)

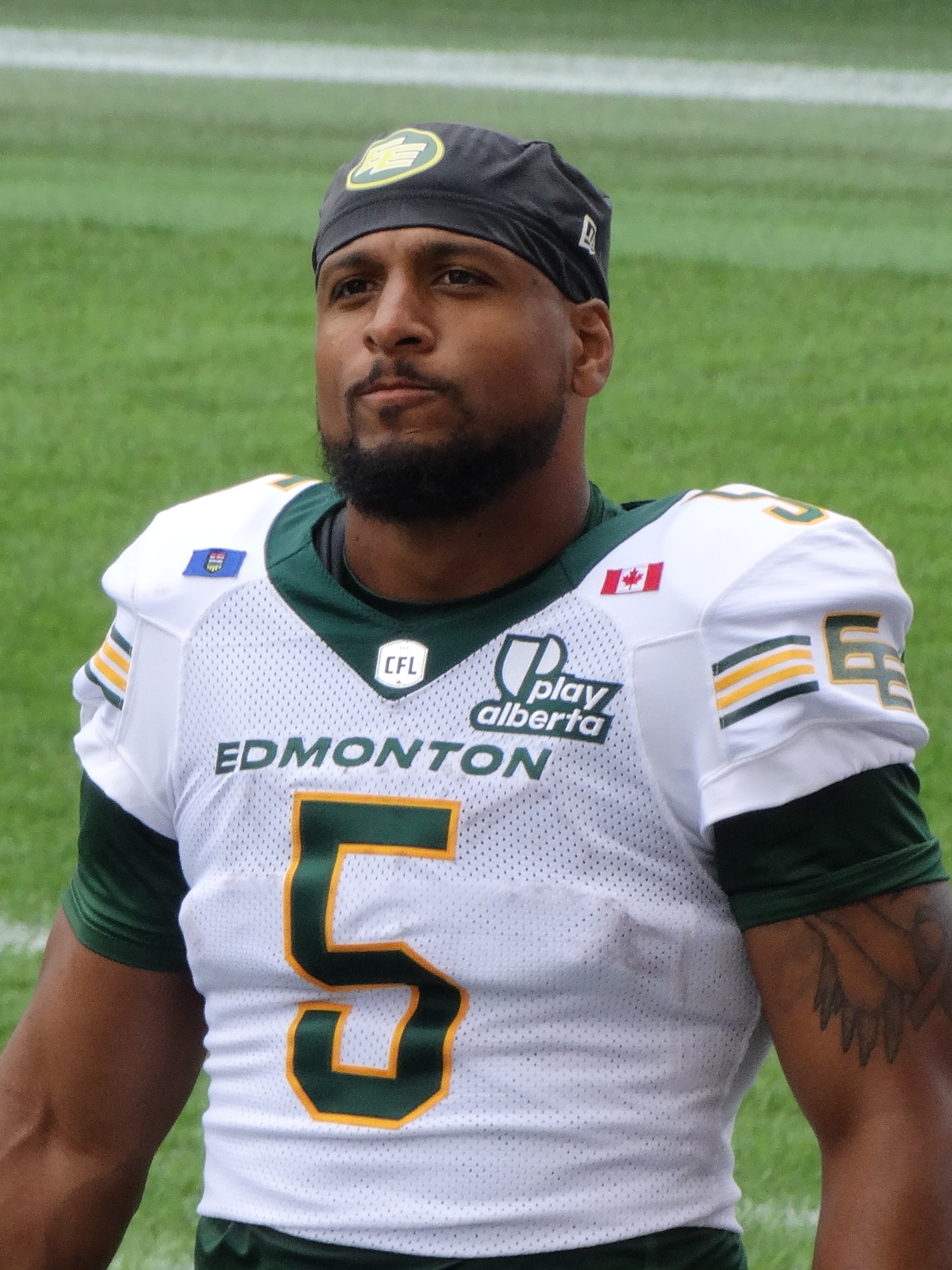
- Rankin with the Edmonton Elks in 2025

No. 5 – Edmonton Elks
- Position: Running back
- Roster status: Active
- CFL status: American

Personal information
- Born: June 22, 1997 (age 29); Oberlin, Ohio, U.S.
- Listed height: 5 ft 10 in (1.78 m)
- Listed weight: 215 lb (98 kg)

Career information
- High school: Elyria Catholic (OH)
- College: Kent State (2016–2018); Northwest Missouri State (2019)
- NFL draft: 2020: undrafted

Career history
- 2021: Bismarck Bucks
- 2022: Frisco Fighters
- 2023: Bay Area Panthers
- 2024–present: Edmonton Elks

Awards and highlights
- Grey Cup champion (2026); IFL champion (2023); First-team All-IFL (2022); Second-team All-IFL (2023)

Career CFL statistics as of 2026
- Rushing yards: 2,948
- Rushing average: 6
- Rushing touchdowns: 23
- Receptions: 127
- Receiving yards: 1,405
- Receiving touchdowns: 6
- Stats at CFL.ca

Justin Rankin (born June 22, 1997) is an American professional football running back for the Edmonton Elks of the Canadian Football League (CFL). He played college football at Kent State and Northwest Missouri State. He has also been a member of the Bismarck Bucks, Frisco Fighters, and Bay Area Panthers of the Indoor Football League (IFL).

== Early life ==
Rankin played high school football at Elyria Catholic High School in Elyria, Ohio, and earned first-team All-Ohio honors three times. He rushed for 13 touchdowns his junior year and 15 touchdowns his senior year. He also participated in track and basketball in high school. He garnered all-state recognition in the 200 metres.

== College career ==
Rankin first played college football for the Kent State Golden Flashes from 2016 to 2018. He played in 11 games, all starts, during his rookie season in 2016, rushing for a team-leading 511 yards and three touchdowns, catching 28 passes for 335 yards and one touchdown, and returning six kickoffs for 140 yards. He appeared in all 12 games, starting 11, in 2017, recording 490 rushing yards for three touchdowns, and 42 receptions for 311 yards two touchdowns. Rankin led the team in rushing yards for the second consecutive season and also led the team in receptions. He played in 12 games in 2018, running for 574 yards and four touchdowns while also catching 14 passes for 127 and one touchdown, and returning 13 kicks for 241 yards.

Rankin transferred to play for the Northwest Missouri State Bearcats in 2019. He appeared in 14 games for the Bearcats, totaling 1,050 rushing yards for 13 touchdowns, and 34 receptions for 371 yards and four touchdowns.

== Professional career ==
Pre-draft measurables
Height	Weight
5 ft 9 1/8 in (1.76 m)	210 lb (95 kg)
Values from Pro Day

Rankin went undrafted in the 2020 NFL draft.

=== Bismarck Bucks ===
Rankin played for the Bismarck Bucks of the Indoor Football League (IFL) in 2021, running for 454 yards and 15 touchdowns.

=== Frisco Fighters ===
Rankin played for the Frisco Fighters of the IFL in 2022, recording a league-leading 776 rushing yards during the regular season and tying for second with 28 rushing touchdowns. He earned first-team All-IFL honors.

=== Bay Area Panthers ===
Rankin joined the IFL's Bay Area Panthers for the 2023 season, and recorded 791 rushing yards and 38 rushing touchdowns during the regular season, garnering second-team All-IFL accolades. The Panthers later won the IFL National Championship by defeating the Sioux Falls Storm by a score of 51–41.

=== Edmonton Elks ===
Rankin was signed by the Edmonton Elks of the Canadian Football League (CFL) on November 23, 2023. He was released on May 19, 2024, but later signed to the team's practice roster on July 21. He was promoted to the active roster on August 2. On August 17, 2024, Rankin rushed for 108 yards and three touchdowns in a 47–22 victory over the Hamilton Tiger-Cats in Week 11. He was named Pro Football Focus' CFL Offensive Player of the Week for Week 11. Additionally Rankin led CFL running backs in yards per carry with 7.8 (2024).

In the 2025 season, Rankin was named the Elks' Most Outstanding Player (MOP). Rankin led the CFL in offensive yards with 1,726 and big plays with 17 during the 2025 campaign. He also recorded the second-biggest rushing performance in Edmonton Elks franchise history, rushing for 204 yards against the Calgary Stampeders during the Labour Day Rematch on September 6, 2025

On October 7, 2025, Rankin signed a two-year extension with the Elks through the 2027 season.

== Career statistics ==
=== CFL ===
Year	Team	Games		Rushing				Receiving			
Year	Team	GP	GS	Att	Yds	Avg	TD	Rec	Yds	Avg	TD
2024	EDM	11	4	98	765	7.8	5	9	52	5.8	1
2025	EDM	18	18	191	1,013	5.3	9	56	713	12.7	4
2026	EDM	17	17	204	1,170	5.7	9	62	640	10.3	1
Career		46	39	493	2,948	6.0	23	127	1,405	11.1	6

=== IFL ===
Year	Team	Games	Rushing				Receiving			
Year	Team	G	Att	Yds	Avg	TD	Rec	Yds	Avg	TD
2021	Bismarck	15	117	454	3.9	15	43	306	7.3	8
2022	Frisco	17	168	776	4.6	28	22	231	10.5	4
2023	Bay Area	17	212	923	4.4	45	27	267	9.9	3
Career		49	497	2,153	4.3	88	92	804	8.7	15

IFL statistics include postseason games, as the Indoor Football League did not separate regular season and postseason statistics in its official records.

=== College ===
Year	Team	Games	Rushing				Receiving			
Year	Team	G	Att	Yds	Avg	TD	Rec	Yds	Avg	TD
2016	Kent State	11	108	511	4.7	3	28	335	12.0	1
2017	Kent State	12	123	490	4.0	3	42	311	7.4	2
2018	Kent State	12	117	574	4.9	4	14	127	9.1	1
2019	NW Missouri State	14	191	1,050	5.5	13	34	371	10.9	4
FBS career		35	348	1,575	4.5	10	84	773	9.2	4
D-II career		14	191	1,050	5.5	13	34	371	10.9	4
