= Craig Peterson =

American football player (born 1985)

No. 19 – Bay Area Panthers
- Position: Placekicker

Personal information
- Born: July 18, 1985 (age 41); Burnt Hills, New York, U.S.
- Listed height: 6 ft 3 in (1.91 m)
- Listed weight: 225 lb (102 kg)

Career information
- High school: Burnt Hills-Ballston Lake (NY)
- College: Cortland
- NFL draft: 2010: undrafted

Career history
- Ottawa Redblacks (2014)*; Tampa Bay Storm (2015–2016); Spokane Empire (2017); Hamilton Tiger Cats (2017)*; Carolina Cobras (2018); Columbus Destroyers (2019); Albany Empire (2021); Massachusetts Pirates (2022); Frisco Fighters (2022); Northern Arizona Wranglers (2022); Arizona Rattlers (2023); Bay Area Panthers (2023–2024)
- * Offseason or practice squad member only

Awards and highlights
- • 2× IFL champion (2022, 2023) • 2× NAL champion (2018, 2021) • 2× Special Teams Player of the Year (2018, 2021) • 2× First-team All-NAL (2018, 2021)

Career AFL statistics
- Field goals made: 4
- Field goal attempts: 6
- PAT made: 85
- PAT attempts: 98
- Tackles: 11
- Stats at ArenaFan.com

Craig Peterson (born July 18, 1985) is an American football placekicker for the Bay Area Panthers of the Indoor Football League (IFL). Peterson won the IFL championship with the Panthers in 2023.

== Professional career ==
On March 23, 2015, Peterson was assigned to the Tampa Bay Storm. On May 19, 2016, Peterson was placed on reassignment.

On February 21, 2017, Peterson signed with the Spokane Empire. On March 10, 2017, Peterson was released. Peterson was 4 of 5 on field goals, and 6 of 11 on point after touchdowns. Peterson re-signed with the Empire on March 15, 2017.

On May 28, 2017, Peterson signed with the Hamilton Tiger Cats of the Canadian Football League (CFL).

On April 19, 2019, Peterson was assigned to the Columbus Destroyers.

On November 30, 2022, Peterson signed with the Arizona Rattlers of the Indoor Football League (IFL).
