= Jayson Palmgren =

American football player (born 1989)

No. 77, 70
- Position: Offensive lineman

Personal information
- Born: April 11, 1989 (age 37); Kansas City, Missouri, U.S.
- Listed height: 6 ft 3 in (1.91 m)
- Listed weight: 300 lb (136 kg)

Career information
- High school: North Kansas City
- College: Missouri
- NFL draft: 2012: undrafted

Career history
- Iowa Barnstormers (2012–2013); Pittsburgh Power (2014); Iowa Barnstormers (2014); Cleveland Gladiators (2015–2016); Kansas City Phantoms (2017); Iowa Barnstormers (2017)

Career AFL statistics
- Total tackles: 2
- Stats at ArenaFan.com

Jayson Palmgren (born April 11, 1989) is an American former football offensive lineman. He played college football at University of Missouri. He was also a member of the Iowa Barnstormers, Pittsburgh Power, Cleveland Gladiators, and Kansas City Phantoms.

== Early life ==
Palmgren attended North Kansas City High School in North Kansas City, Missouri.

== College career ==
Palmgren played for the Missouri Tigers from 2007 to 2011. He was the team's starter his final two years and helped the Tigers to 18 wins. He played in 35 games during his career including 26 starts at guard.

== Professional career ==
Pre-draft measurables
Height	Weight	40-yard dash	10-yard split	20-yard split	20-yard shuttle	Three-cone drill	Vertical jump	Broad jump	Bench press
6 ft 2 in (1.88 m)	298 lb (135 kg)	5.37 s	1.89 s	3.01 s	4.70 s	7.84 s	27 in (0.69 m)	9 ft 4 in (2.84 m)	24 reps
All values from Missouri Pro Day

After going undrafted in the 2012 NFL draft, Palmgren was invited to rookie mini-camp with the Seattle Seahawks.

In 2012, Palmgren was assigned to the Iowa Barnstormers of the Arena Football League (AFL). He started the final 8 games of the 2012 season for the Barnstormers. Mid-way through the 2013 season, Palmgren was placed on injured reserve for the rest of the season.

On November 23, 2013, Palmgren was assigned to the Pittsburgh Power of the AFL. He appeared in 8 games for the Power. On June 9, 2014, Palmgren was placed on reassignment.

Palmgren then returned to the Barnstormers to finish the 2014 AFL season. He was assigned to the AFL's Cleveland Gladiators in 2015.

Palmgren signed with the Kansas City Phantoms of Champions Indoor Football for the 2017 season. On March 7, 2017, the Phantoms placed Palmgren on suspension.

On March 6, 2017 Palmgren signed with the Iowa Barnstormers, whom had moved to the Indoor Football League (IFL). On October 5, 2017, Palmgren re-signed with the Barnstormers.
