= Donovan Porterie =

American football player (born 1987)

No. 15, 3
- Position: Quarterback

Personal information
- Born: May 29, 1987 (age 39); Port Arthur, Texas, U.S.
- Listed height: 6 ft 4 in (1.93 m)
- Listed weight: 225 lb (102 kg)

Career information
- High school: Memorial (Port Arthur)
- College: New Mexico
- NFL draft: 2010: undrafted

Career history
- Sioux City Bandits (2010); Fairbanks Grizzlies (2011); Green Bay Blizzard (2012–2013); New Mexico Stars (2014)*; Spokane Shock (2014); Green Bay Blizzard (2015); Iowa Barnstormers (2016); Duke City Gladiators (2017); Kansas City Phantoms (2018)
- * Offseason or practice squad member only

Awards and highlights
- Second Team All-IFL (2015); CIF MVP (2017); All-CIF Team (2017); Second Team CIF Southern Conference (2017)

Career AFL statistics
- Comp. / Att.: 34 / 66
- Passing yards: 346
- TD–INT: 7–7
- Passer rating: 53.79
- Rushing TD: 1
- Stats at ArenaFan.com

Donovan Wayne Porterie (born May 29, 1987) is an American former professional football quarterback. He was signed by the Fairbanks Grizzlies as an undrafted free agent in 2011. He played college football at New Mexico.

Porterie signed with the New Mexico Stars of the Lone Star Football League (LSFL) for the 2014 season, but later decided against playing with the team to pursue a higher level of play.

Porterie signed with the Spokane Shock to help replace 2013 AFL MVP, Erik Meyer. In Porterie's Spokane debut he threw 5 touchdowns and 4 interceptions in a 52–41 loss to the Pittsburgh Power.

In January 2015, Porterie signed with the Green Bay Blizzard.

On September 16, 2015, Porterie signed with the Iowa Barnstormers.

On January 19, 2017, Porterie signed with the Duke City Gladiators of Champions Indoor Football (CIF). That same year, he was named League MVP of the season, completing 249 of 398 passes, and accumulating 2,784 passing yards and 60 touchdowns, 3 of which were rushing touchdowns.
