= Rayshaun Kizer =

American football player and coach (born 1985)

Tucson Sugar Skulls
- Title: Head coach

Personal information
- Born: February 3, 1985 (age 41); Euclid, Ohio, U.S.
- Listed height: 5 ft 10 in (1.78 m)
- Listed weight: 210 lb (95 kg)

Career information
- High school: Euclid (OH)
- College: Walsh
- NFL draft: 2007: undrafted

Career history

Playing
- New York Jets (2007)*; Montreal Alouettes (2007–2008); Green Bay Blizzard (2009); Orlando Predators (2010–2011); Montreal Alouettes (2011)*; Hamilton Tiger-Cats (2011)*; Philadelphia Soul (2012–2014); Arizona Rattlers (2015)*; New Orleans VooDoo (2015); Los Angeles KISS (2015–2016); Qingdao Clipper (2016); Cleveland Gladiators (2017); Georgia Doom (2018)
- * Offseason or practice squad member only

Coaching
- Bismarck Bucks (2019) Assistant head coach / Defensive coordinator; Massachusetts Pirates (2020–2021) Assistant head coach / Defensive coordinator; Massachusetts Pirates (2022) Head coach / Defensive coordinator; Omaha Beef (2023) Head coach / Defensive coordinator; Tucson Sugar Skulls (2024–2025) Defensive coordinator; Tucson Sugar Skulls (2026–present) Head coach

Awards and highlights
- 2× First-team All-Arena (2010, 2011); 3× Second-team All-Arena (2013, 2014, 2015)

Career CFL statistics
- Total tackles: 30
- Stats at CFL.ca (archived)

Career AFL statistics
- Total tackles: 518
- Forced fumbles: 7
- Pass deflections: 145
- Interceptions: 67
- Total touchdowns: 12
- Stats at ArenaFan.com

Head coaching record
- Regular season: 21–5 (.808)
- Postseason: 2–1 (.667)
- Career: 23–6 (.793)

Rayshaun Kizer (born February 3, 1985) is an American football coach who is the head coach of the Tucson Sugar Skulls of the Indoor Football League (IFL). He was the former head coach and defensive coordinator of the Massachusetts Pirates of the Indoor Football League (IFL) and of the Omaha Beef of Champions Indoor Football (CIF). He is also a former National Football League, Canadian Football League, and Arena Football League defensive back. He played his college football at Walsh University and graduated with his bachelor's degree in Computer Science. He has been a member of the New York Jets of the National Football League, Montreal Alouettes and Hamilton Tiger-Cats of the Canadian Football League, Orlando Predators, Philadelphia Soul, Arizona Rattlers, New Orleans VooDoo, Los Angeles KISS and Cleveland Gladiators of the Arena Football League and Green Bay Blizzard of the Arena Football 2. He also served as the assistant head coach, defensive coordinator and special teams coach of the Bismarck Bucks of the IFL.

== Early life and college ==
Kizer attended Euclid High School in Euclid, Ohio.

He played for the Walsh University Cavaliers from 2003 to 2006. He recorded 14 interceptions for the Cavaliers, returning 5 for touchdowns. He was named first-team All-American and first-team All-Conference his senior year. He was also named second-team All-Conference as a junior and first-team All-Conference as a sophomore. He was inducted into the school's Wall of Fame as part of the class of 2015.

== Professional career ==
Pre-draft measurables
Height	Weight	40-yard dash	10-yard split	20-yard split	20-yard shuttle	Three-cone drill	Vertical jump	Broad jump	Bench press
5 ft 10 in (1.78 m)	185 lb (84 kg)	4.51 s	1.56 s	2.62 s	4.07 s	6.73 s	35 1/2 in (0.90 m)	10 ft 0 in (3.05 m)	15 reps
All values from Pro Day

=== New York Jets ===
Kizer signed with the New York Jets on May 15, 2007, after going undrafted in the 2007 NFL draft. He was released by the Jets on August 27, 2007.

=== Montreal Alouettes (first stint) ===
Kizer was signed by the Montreal Alouettes on September 11, 2007. He was released by the Alouettes on October 7, 2008.

=== Green Bay Blizzard ===
Kizer played for the Green Bay Blizzard of the af2 during the 2009 season. He played in 17 games for the Blizzard, recording 65 tackles, 4 interceptions, 15 pass break-ups, one forced fumble, and 2 fumble recoveries. He was awarded Defensive Player of the Week honors in the American Conference Finals Game after sealing the victory with a game-ending interception.

=== Orlando Predators ===
Kizer played for the Orlando Predators from 2010 to 2011. He led the Arena Football League in interceptions with 12 his rookie year in 2010, earning first-team All-Arena honors. He set a new AFL record when he recorded 16 interceptions during the 2011 season. Kizer was also named first-team All-Arena for the second consecutive year.

=== Montreal Alouettes (second stint) ===
Kizer was signed to the practice squad of the Alouettes on September 27, 2011. He was released by the Alouettes on October 6, 2011.

=== Hamilton Tiger-Cats ===
Kizer was signed to the practice squad of the Hamilton Tiger-Cats on October 15, 2011. He was released by the Tiger-Cats on November 2, 2011.

=== Philadelphia Soul ===
Kizer signed with the Philadelphia Soul on November 22, 2011. He earned second-team All-Arena honors after recording 82 tackles and 9 interceptions in 18 games with the Soul in 2013. He was named second-team All-Arena for the second consecutive year after collecting 101.5 tackles and 9 interceptions in 18 games in 2014.

=== Arizona Rattlers ===
On January 7, 2015, Kizer was assigned to the Arizona Rattlers.

=== New Orleans VooDoo ===
On March 23, 2015, Kizer, was traded to the New Orleans VooDoo in exchange for future considerations.

=== Los Angeles KISS ===
On May 25, 2015, Kizer was traded to the Los Angeles KISS for future considerations. He earned second-team All-Arena honors for the third consecutive year after recording 87.5 tackles and five interceptions in 2015. He became a free agent after the 2015 season. On November 6, 2015, Kizer was assigned to the KISS for the 2016 season. Kizer suffered a season ending ankle injury that kept him out for most of the 2016 season.

=== Qingdao Clipper ===
Kizer was selected by the Qingdao Clipper in the fourth round of the 2016 CAFL draft.

=== Cleveland Gladiators ===
On January 9, 2017, Kizer was assigned to the Cleveland Gladiators.

=== Georgia Doom ===
In March 2018, Kizer was assigned to the Georgia Doom.

== Coaching career ==
=== Bismarck Bucks ===
In January 2019, Kizer was assigned to the Bismarck Bucks of the Indoor Football League (IFL) as the assistant head coach, defensive coordinator and special teams coach.

=== Massachusetts Pirates ===
In March 2020, Kizer was assigned to the Massachusetts Pirates of the National Arena League as the defensive coordinator. Due to COVID in 2020 the Massachusetts Pirates season was cancelled.

Following the next season in 2021, Kizer returned to the Pirates as the assistant head coach and defensive coordinator. They won the 2021 United Bowl against the Arizona Rattlers. Winners of 11 straight games that season and Kizer was the only assistant coach to receive votes for coach of the year. He also had the #1 Defense in the league that season holding opponents to 31.7 PPG.

In January 2022, Kizer was promoted to head coach of the Pirates. He had a successful first season as a head coach with an 11–5 record but lost the first round of the playoffs at home against the Quad City Steamwheelers.

=== Omaha Beef ===
In January 2022, Kizer was assigned to the Omaha Beef of the Champions Indoor Football as the head coach. In his first season as the Beef head coach, he was the first head coach in CIF history to ever have an undefeated season. They also won the 2023 CIF Championship against the Salina Liberty 50-30.

Also as the defensive coordinator of this team, Kizer had the best defense in CIF history holding teams to a record-setting 20.8 PPG and only 142.8 YPG for the entire season.

Despite this Kizer would not return to the Beef for their 2024 season, as he resigned as head coach on December 18, 2023 and was replaced by Mike Tatum.

=== Tucson Sugar Skulls ===
In December 2023, Kizer was assigned to the Tucson Sugar Skulls of the IFL as the defensive coordinator.

On September 23, 2025, Kizer was promoted to head coach of the Sugar Skulls.

== Head coaching record ==
League	Team	Year	Regular season				Postseason			
League	Team	Year	Won	Lost	Win %	Finish	Won	Lost	Win %	Result
IFL	Massachusetts Pirates	2022	11	5	.688	2nd in East	0	1	.000	Lost Quarterfinals (Quad City) 38–39
CIF	Omaha Beef	2023	10	0	1.000	1st in CIF	2	0	1.000	Won Semifinal (Billings) 42–6; Won Champions Bowl VIII (Salina) 50-30
IFL	Tucson Sugar Skulls	2025	7	9	.438	4th in West	0	1	.000	Lost First Round (San Diego) 54–47
IFL total			18	14	.563		0	2	.000	
CIF total			10	0	1.000		2	0	1.000	
Career total			28	14	.667		2	2	.500	
