= Stephen Franklin (American football) =

American football player (born 1988)

No. 4, 5
- Position: Linebacker

Personal information
- Born: September 26, 1988 (age 38); Kansas City, Missouri, U.S.
- Listed height: 6 ft 0 in (1.83 m)
- Listed weight: 235 lb (107 kg)

Career information
- High school: North Kansas City (Kansas City, Missouri)
- College: Southern Illinois
- NFL draft: 2011: undrafted

Career history

Playing
- Cincinnati Bengals (2011)*; Seattle Seahawks (2011); Jacksonville Jaguars (2011); Sioux City Bandits (2014); Colorado Ice (2015); Kansas City Phantoms (2017)
- * Offseason or practice squad member only

Coaching
- Unity Christian HS (IL) (2013) Defensive coordinator; Southern Illinois (2014) Strength and conditioning intern; North Kansas City HS (MO) (2019) Defensive line coach; Turner HS (KS) (2020) Head coach; Bethel (MN) (2021–2022) Special teams coordinator & inside linebackers coach; Central Missouri (2023–2024) Special teams coordinator & linebackers coach

Awards and highlights
- Second-team CIF Northern Conference (2017)

Career NFL statistics
- Total tackles: 2
- Stats at Pro Football Reference

Stephen Franklin (born September 26, 1988) is an American football and former linebacker. He initially signed with the Cincinnati Bengals of the National Football League (NFL) as an undrafted free agent following the 2011 NFL draft. He also played for the Seattle Seahawks and the Jacksonville Jaguars before moving onto the Sioux City Bandits of the Champions Professional Indoor Football League (CPIFL), Colorado Ice of the Indoor Football League (IFL), and Kansas City Phantoms of the Champions Indoor Football (CIF).

== Playing career ==
Franklin began his playing career at North Kansas City High School in Kansas City, Missouri. He played college football for Southern Illinois.

Franklin went undrafted following the 2011 NFL draft and signed with the Cincinnati Bengals of the National Football League (NFL). He would be released and sign with the Seattle Seahawks and Jacksonville Jaguars throughout the remainder of the season.

After three seasons away from football he joined the Sioux City Bandits of the Champions Professional Indoor Football League (CPIFL) in 2014. He would play for the Colorado Ice of the Indoor Football League (IFL) in 2015 and the Kansas City Phantoms of the Champions Indoor Football (CIF).

== Coaching career ==
Franklin began his career with Unity Christian High School in 2018 where he served as the school's defensive coordinator. He then moved onto his alma mater in North Kansas City High School as the defensive line coach. Following his one year stint with North Kansas City he accepted a head coach position for Turner High School in 2020.

In 2021, Franklin joined Bethel as its inside linebackers coach and special teams coordinator.

On March 22, 2023, Franklin was hired by Central Missouri to be the team's linebackers coach and special teams coordinator.

== Head coaching record ==
Year	Team	Overall	Conference	Standing	Bowl/playoffs
Turner Golden Bears () (2020)
2020	Turner	0–4	0–1	5th	
Turner:		0–4	0–1		
Total:		0–4			
