= Jorrick Calvin =

American football player (born 1987)

No. 38, 14
- Position: Cornerback

Personal information
- Born: July 17, 1987 (age 39); Baton Rouge, Louisiana, U.S.
- Listed height: 5 ft 10 in (1.78 m)
- Listed weight: 182 lb (83 kg)

Career information
- High school: Scotlandville Magnet (Baton Rouge)
- College: Troy
- NFL draft: 2010: 6th round, 201st overall pick

Career history
- Arizona Cardinals (2010)*; Philadelphia Eagles (2010); New Orleans VooDoo (2012); Chicago Rush (2012–2013); Los Angeles Kiss (2014)*; Chicago Blitz (2016); Kansas City Phantoms (2017)*
- * Offseason or practice squad member only

Career NFL statistics
- Total tackles: 1
- Fumble recoveries: 1
- Return yards: 817
- Stats at Pro Football Reference

Career AFL statistics
- Total tackles: 174
- Sacks: 0.5
- Interceptions: 15
- Total touchdowns: 4
- Stats at ArenaFan.com

Jorrick Raydell Calvin (born July 17, 1987) is an American former professional football player who played as a cornerback. He was selected by the Arizona Cardinals of the National Football League (NFL) in the sixth round of the 2010 NFL draft. He played college football at Troy.

He was also a member of the Philadelphia Eagles, New Orleans VooDoo, Chicago Rush, Los Angeles Kiss, Chicago Blitz and Kansas City Phantoms

== College career ==
Calvin played college football at Troy University from 2008 to 2009, to which he had transferred from East Central Community College.

== Professional career ==
=== Arizona Cardinals ===
Calvin was selected by the Arizona Cardinals in the sixth round (201st overall) of the 2010 NFL draft.

=== Philadelphia Eagles ===
Calvin was traded to the Philadelphia Eagles on August 30, 2010, in exchange for fullback Charles Scott, who was selected one pick before Calvin in the 2010 NFL Draft.

Calvin became the starting kickoff returner for the Eagles after Ellis Hobbs suffered an injury early in the season. Hobbs regained the starting job after Calvin fumbled the ball on a return, but after Hobbs was placed on injured reserve with a neck injury, Calvin took back the job for the November 28 game against the Chicago Bears.

On December 12, 2010, Calvin fielded a kickoff from Dallas Cowboys kicker David Buehler in the Eagles' own end zone. Calvin then jogged around the end zone without crossing the goal line and introducing the ball into the field of play, or "downing" the ball and ending the play with a touchback. Head coach Andy Reid said Calvin was told to run around because the Cowboys' kickoff team was so used to Buehler kicking touchbacks that they typically did not complete the coverage. Immediately following, Calvin was involved in an on-field altercation with Cowboys cornerback Alan Ball, resulting in an unnecessary roughness penalty for Calvin. Calvin was placed on injured reserve on December 23 after suffering a back injury in a week 15 game against the New York Giants.

Calvin was waived by the Eagles on September 1, 2011.

=== Los Angeles Kiss ===
Calvin was assigned to the Los Angeles Kiss on December 23, 2013. He was reassigned on March 8, 2014, but appeared in the first episode of 4th and Loud on AMC.

=== Chicago Blitz ===
On February 10, 2016, Calvin signed with the Chicago Blitz.

=== Kansas City Phantoms ===
Calvin signed with the Kansas City Phantoms in 2017. He was released on February 28, 2017.
