= Unity Christian High School =

Unity Christian High School may refer to any of the following:

- Unity Christian High School (Fulton) in Fulton, Illinois, United States
- Unity Christian High School, Orange City, Iowa United States
- Unity Christian High School (Hudsonville) in Hudsonville, Michigan, United States
