= Michael Dyer =

American gridiron football player (born 1990)

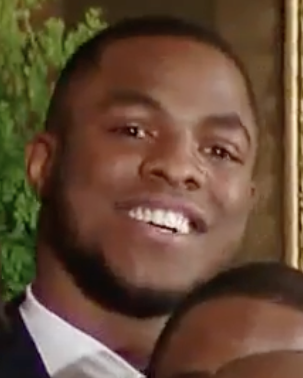
- Dyer at the White House in 2011

Profile
- Position: Running back

Personal information
- Born: October 13, 1990 (age 36); Little Rock, Arkansas, U.S.
- Listed height: 5 ft 9 in (1.75 m)
- Listed weight: 220 lb (100 kg)

Career information
- High school: Little Rock Christian Academy
- College: Auburn (2010–2011); Louisville (2013–2014)
- NFL draft: 2015: undrafted

Career history
- Oakland Raiders (2015)*; Toronto Argonauts (2016)*; Saskatchewan Roughriders (2016); Texas Revolution (2017–2018); Cedar Rapids River Kings (2020)
- * Offseason or practice squad member only

Awards and highlights
- BCS national champion (2011); BCS National Championship MVP (2011); First-team All-SEC (2011); Freshman All-American (2010); Freshman All-SEC (2010); First-team CIF Southern Conference (2017); Second-team CIF Southern Conference (2017); All-CIF Team (2017); CIF Rookie of the Year (2017); CIF champion (2017)
- Stats at Pro Football Reference

Michael Dyer (born October 13, 1990) is an American professional football running back. He played college football for the Auburn Tigers and Louisville Cardinals. He was the most valuable player (MVP) of the 2011 BCS National Championship Game with Auburn.

== College career ==
=== Auburn ===
As a true freshman in 2010, Dyer rushed for 1,093 yards on 182 carries and five touchdowns, breaking the Auburn record for most rushing yards by a freshman, previously held by Bo Jackson. During the 2011 BCS National Championship Game against the Oregon Ducks he rushed for 143 yards on 22 carries and was named the Offensive Player of the Game.

Dyer finished the 2011 regular season, his sophomore year, with 1,242 yards rushing on 242 attempts, an average of 5.1 yards-per-carry. He rushed for 10 touchdowns and averaged 103.5 yards-per-game. He was named to the Associated Press' All-SEC first-team and the Coaches' All-SEC first-team.

Prior to Auburn's appearance in the 2011 Chick-fil-A Bowl, Dyer was suspended indefinitely for testing positive for synthetic marijuana and possession of a weapon, which was later used in an armed robbery allegedly committed by four members of the Auburn team. Dyer requested to transfer from Auburn and was granted a conditional release. On January 6, 2012, Auburn released Dyer from his football scholarship to transfer.

=== Arkansas State ===
After his release from Auburn, Dyer followed his previous offensive coordinator, Gus Malzahn, to Arkansas State University. According to NCAA rules Dyer would have to sit out a year to play for the Red Wolves.

On March 10, 2012, Dyer and teammate Ronnie Wright were pulled over in separate cars for speeding by the Arkansas State Police. The police officer, Cpl. Royce Denney, discovered a gun and possibly marijuana in Dyer's car. Denney scolded Dyer about the gun during the 58 minute stop and confiscated it without any justification. Denney also dumped the bag of suspected marijuana onto the ground. He also turned off the cruiser camera during the stop, though some audio was recorded (mostly of Denny lecturing Dyer). Dyer and White were each cited with going 96 m.p.h. in a 70 m.p.h zone and fined $175, but no other charges were filed. The news of this event was not immediately made public.

Rumors began in July 2012 that Dyer was transferring to Pittsburg State University in Kansas. Dyer denied these rumors in a July 20, 2012 public press conference by stating that "I never considered transferring."

However, on July 27, 2012, the Arkansas State Police contacted ASU to reveal that they would be releasing a video of the March 10 traffic stop as a result of a Freedom of Information Act request from the press. Malzahn subsequently reviewed the complete video for the first time. Malzahn, who was informed about the incident in March but was led to believe (by Dyer) it involved a gun but no drugs, claimed to have heard "incriminating remarks" on the video and dismissed Dyer from the team on July 28, 2012.

Coincidentally with the release of the video, the state police fired Cpl. Denney, citing the unconventional stop and that it was Denney's second time in the last three months to not conform to the law.

=== Arkansas Baptist College ===
Dyer attended Arkansas Baptist College. He did not play football and instead worked toward an associate degree. He was able to complete 46 hours in 3 semesters and earned an associate degree. He considered the NFL Supplemental Draft but wanted to get rid of his bad name and prove he is of good character.

=== Louisville ===
On August 2, 2013, it was announced that Dyer would enroll at the University of Louisville. He was eligible to play immediately and had two years of eligibility remaining.

On December 23, 2014, it was announced that Dyer was academically ineligible to play in Louisville's final game of the 2014 season, which was the Belk Bowl against Georgia. This effectively ended his college football career.

== Professional career ==
Pre-draft measurables
Height	Weight	Arm length	Hand span	40-yard dash	10-yard split	20-yard split	Vertical jump	Broad jump	Bench press
5 ft 8 1/2 in (1.74 m)	218 lb (99 kg)	30 5/8 in (0.78 m)	9 1/2 in (0.24 m)	4.58 s	1.62 s	2.74 s	34.0 in (0.86 m)	10 ft 0 in (3.05 m)	26 reps
All values from NFL Combine

=== Oakland Raiders ===
After going undrafted and not being offered a free-agent deal Dyer was signed on May 11, 2015, by the Oakland Raiders after attending a tryout at the team's rookie minicamp.

=== Saskatchewan Roughriders ===
Dyer signed with the Saskatchewan Roughriders on June 16, 2016. He was later released on August 3, 2016.

=== Texas Revolution ===
In 2017, Dyer signed with the Texas Revolution of the Champions Indoor Football league. He was named Rookie of the Year and led the Revolution to a CIF championship.

=== Cedar Rapids River Kings ===
On October 6, 2019, Dyer signed with the Cedar Rapids River Kings of the Indoor Football League for the 2020 season. The 2020 season was cancelled after one game due to the onset of the COVID-19 pandemic and the River Kings subsequently folded.
