= Kordell Jackson =

American gridiron football player (born 1999)

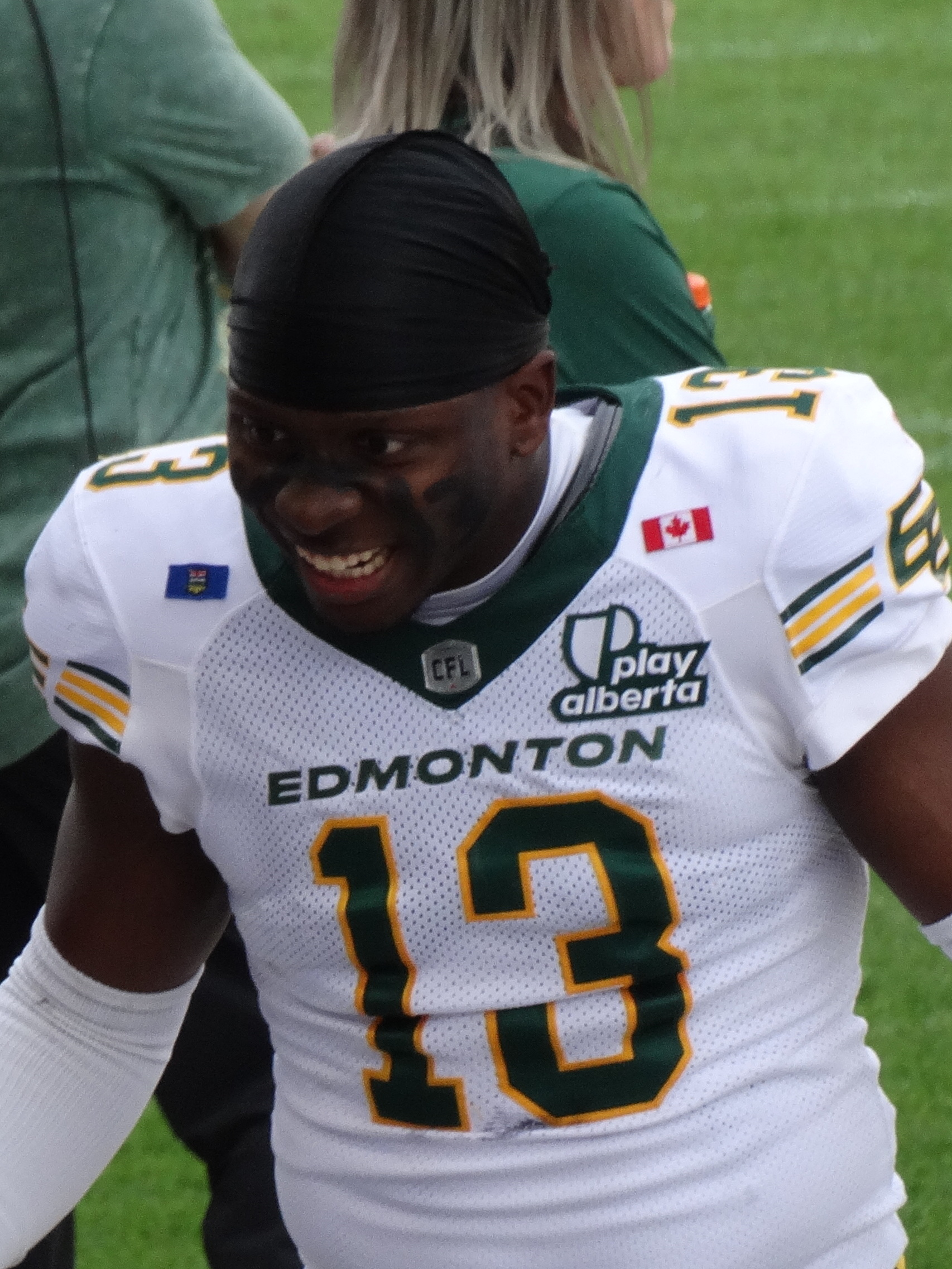
- Jackson with the Edmonton Elks in 2025

No. 13 – Edmonton Elks
- Position: Defensive back
- Roster status: 1-game injured list
- CFL status: American

Personal information
- Born: April 9, 1999 (age 27); Birmingham, Alabama, U.S.
- Listed height: 5 ft 9 in (1.75 m)
- Listed weight: 185 lb (84 kg)

Career information
- High school: Ramsay (Birmingham, AL)
- College: Austin Peay (2017–2021)
- NFL draft: 2022: undrafted

Career history
- Frisco Fighters (2023); Edmonton Elks (2024–present)

Awards and highlights
- Grey Cup champion (2026); CFL West All-Star (2026); IFL defensive rookie of the year (2023); First-team All-IFL (2023); 2× Consensus All-American (2019–2020); 3× First-team All-OVC (2019–2021)
- Stats at CFL.ca

Kordell A. Jackson (born April 9, 1999) is an American professional football defensive back for the Edmonton Elks of the Canadian Football League (CFL). He played college football at Austin Peay. He has also been a member of the Frisco Fighters of the Indoor Football League (IFL).

== Early life ==
Jackson attended Ramsay High School in Birmingham, Alabama. He recorded 235 tackles and 10 interceptions in high school. He earned all-state honors his senior year.

== College career ==
Jackson played college football for the Austin Peay Governors from 2017 to 2021.

He played in all 12 games his freshman year in 2017, totaling 42 tackles, three sacks, one interception, and eight pass breakups. He appeared in 10 games during the 2018 season, accumulating 32 tackles, two interceptions, seven pass breakups, and one forced fumble. Jackson played in all 15 games in 2019, recording 47 tackles, two sacks, seven interceptions, 10 pass breakups, two forced fumbles, and two fumble recoveries. He garnered first team All-Ohio Valley Conference (OVC) and consensus All-American recognition that season. He appeared in all nine games of the COVID-19 shortened 2020 season, recording a career-high 54 tackles, 1.5 sacks, one interception, six pass breakups, one fumble recovery, and one blocked kick, earning both first team All-OVC and consensus All-American honors for the second consecutive season. Due to a knee injury, Jackson only played in six games in 2021. He totaled 41 tackles, four sacks, and two pass breakups that season, earning first team All-OVC for the third straight year.

Jackson finished his college career with 216 tackles, 10.5 sacks, 11 interceptions, 33 pass breakups, three forced fumbles, three fumble recoveries, and one blocked kick in 52 games played.

== Professional career ==
Pre-draft measurables
Height	Weight	Arm length	Hand span	Wingspan	40-yard dash	10-yard split	20-yard split	20-yard shuttle	Three-cone drill	Vertical jump	Broad jump	Bench press
5 ft 8 3/8 in (1.74 m)	178 lb (81 kg)	28 1/4 in (0.72 m)	9 1/8 in (0.23 m)	5 ft 9 1/4 in (1.76 m)	4.72 s	1.65 s	2.72 s	4.26 s	7.24 s	33.0 in (0.84 m)	9 ft 11 in (3.02 m)	11 reps
All values from Pro Day

After going undrafted in the 2022 NFL draft, Jackson was invited to rookie minicamp on a tryout basis by both the Baltimore Ravens and New Orleans Saints.

Jackson played for the Frisco Fighters of the Indoor Football League (IFL) in 2023. He played in 16 games for the Fighters, totaling 68 tackles, 23 pass deflections, and a league-leading eight interceptions, three of which were returned for touchdowns. He was named the IFL Defensive Rookie of the Year and also earned first team All-IFL honors.

Jackson signed with the Edmonton Elks of the Canadian Football League (CFL) on February 7, 2024. He was moved to the practice roster on June 2, promoted to the active roster on June 7, moved back to the practice roster on June 20, and promoted to the active roster again on July 13, 2024.
