= Anthony Russo (American football) =

American football player (born 1997)

No. 15, 9
- Position: Quarterback

Personal information
- Born: December 6, 1997 (age 28); Doylestown, Pennsylvania, U.S.
- Listed height: 6 ft 4 in (1.93 m)
- Listed weight: 235 lb (107 kg)

Career information
- High school: Archbishop Wood (Warminster, Pennsylvania)
- College: Temple (2016–2020); Michigan State (2021)
- NFL draft: 2022: undrafted

Career history
- San Antonio Brahmas (2023)*; Massachusetts Pirates (2023)
- * Offseason or practice squad member only

Awards and highlights
- Third-team All-IFL (2023)

Career IFL statistics as of Week 13, 2023
- Passing attempts: 257
- Passing completions: 162
- Completion percentage: 63
- TD–INT: 44–9
- Passing yards: 1,963
- Passer rating: 176.7

Anthony Russo (born December 6, 1997) is an American former football quarterback. He played college football for the Temple Owls and Michigan State Spartans. He also played for the San Antonio Brahmas of the XFL.

== College career ==
=== Temple ===
At Temple University in 2016, Russo took a redshirt year after not appearing in any games for the Owls.

In 2017, Russo made his college football debut as a field goal holder against No. 15 UCF in the season finale.

In 2018, Russo entered the season as the backup but gained the starting position by week two and lead the team to a 7–3 record—only missing the season finale before returning for the bowl game. He threw his first-career touchdown against Maryland. Against Heisman candidate McKenzie Milton and UCF, he threw for a career-high 52 pass attempts, 31 pass completions, 444 passing yards, four passing touchdowns, twelve rush attempts, and 46 rushing yards. The team lost the 2018 Independence Bowl 27–56.

In 2019, Russo started every game for the Owls; leading the team to an 8–5 record.

In 2020, Russo was named to the Golden Arm Award watchlist. He started the first three games of the season before an injury and COVID-19 ended his season early. On December 3, 2020, Russo announced he would transfer from Temple.

=== Michigan State ===
In 2021, Russo transferred to Michigan State University and competed with, and lost to, Payton Thorne for the starting position. He played in two games for the Spartans: Ohio State and Youngstown State. In his debut against Youngstown State he came in relief and completed five of his seven pass attempts for 43 yards.

=== Statistics ===
Year	Team	Games		Passing								Rushing			
Year	Team	GP	Record	Comp	Att	Pct	Yards	Avg	TD	Int	Rate	Att	Yards	Avg	TD
2016	Temple	DNP													
2017	Temple	1	0–0	0	0	0.0	0	0.0	0	0	0.0	0	0	0.0	0
2018	Temple	11	7–3	198	345	57.4	2,563	7.4	14	14	125.1	43	63	1.5	3
2019	Temple	13	8–5	246	419	58.7	2,861	6.8	21	12	126.9	35	-64	-1.8	2
2020	Temple	3	1–2	92	135	68.1	868	6.4	9	6	135.3	22	31	1.4	2
2021	Michigan State	2	0–0	7	9	77.8	43	4.8	0	0	117.9	3	10	3.3	0
Career		30	16−10	543	908	59.8	6,335	6.4	44	32	127.4	103	40	0.4	7

== Professional career ==
Pre-draft measurables
Height	Weight	Arm length	Hand span	40-yard dash	10-yard split	20-yard split	20-yard shuttle	Three-cone drill	Vertical jump	Broad jump
6 ft 3 in (1.91 m)	239 lb (108 kg)	31 1/2 in (0.80 m)	9 3/8 in (0.24 m)	4.95 s	1.76 s	2.79 s	4.57 s	7.51 s	31 1/2 in (0.80 m)	8 ft 10 in (2.69 m)
All values from Pro Day

=== San Antonio Brahmas ===
On November 16, 2022, Russo was selected by the San Antonio Brahmas of the XFL in the 2023 XFL draft.

On January 22, 2023, Russo was released by the Brahmas during roster cuts.

=== Massachusetts Pirates ===
On April 1, 2023, Russo signed with the Massachusetts Pirates of the Indoor Football League (IFL). Following an injury to starter Alejandro Bennifield, Russo took over and lead the team to an undefeated season at home. He announced his retirement after the 2023 season.
