= Rony Nelson =

American football player (born 1989)

No. 5 – West Michigan Ironmen
- Position: Defensive lineman
- Roster status: Active

Personal information
- Born: January 24, 1989 (age 37); Miami, Florida
- Listed height: 6 ft 1 in (1.85 m)
- Listed weight: 265 lb (120 kg)

Career information
- High school: Miami (FL) Jackson
- College: Iowa State
- NFL draft: 2013: undrafted

Career history
- Iowa Barnstormers (2013); Bemidji Axemen (2014–2015); West Michigan Ironmen (2016–2018); Cleveland Gladiators (2016)*
- * Offseason or practice squad member only

Awards and highlights
- Second Team CIF Northern Conference (2017)

Career AFL statistics
- Tackle: 1
- Sacks: 0
- Pass breakups: 0
- Fumble recoveries: 0
- Stats at ArenaFan.com

Rony Nelson (born January 24, 1989) is a professional American football defensive linemen for the West Michigan Ironmen of the Indoor Football League (IFL). He has also been a member of the Iowa Barnstormers, Bemidji Axemen and the Cleveland Gladiators. He attended the Iowa State University and played for the school's football team. According to the AFL, Nelson stands at 6 feet 1 inch (1.85 m) and weighs 266 pounds (121 kg).

== Early life ==
Nelson attended Miami Jackson High School, where he was a soccer player before the football coaches recruited him to play. Upon graduation, Nelson enrolled at Yuba College, where he would continue his football career. Nelson earned a scholarship to Iowa State University, where he played 3 years with the Cyclones football team.

== Professional career ==
=== Iowa Barnstormers ===
Nelson was assigned to the Iowa Barnstormers of the Arena Football League (AFL), just a few days before their final game of the season. Nelson played linebacker, and recorded one tackle.

=== Bemidji Axemen ===
Nelson signed with the Bemidji Axemen in 2014. Nelson recorded 25 tackles and three sacks during his first season with the Axemen. Nelson played in 11 games with the Axemen during the 2015 season, recording 32 tackles. Nelson re-signed with the Axemen for the 2016 season.

=== West Michigan Ironmen ===
Nelson signed with the West Michigan Ironmen for the 2016 season. He would later be placed on the exempt list, but returned to help lead the Ironmen to the 2016 AIF Championship game. Nelson returned to the Ironmen in 2017. On November 8, 2017, Nelson re-signed with the Ironmen for 2018.

=== Cleveland Gladiators ===
On February 8, 2016, Nelson was assigned to the Cleveland Gladiators. On March 9, 2016, Nelson was placed on reassignment.
