= 2021 Indoor Football League season =

2021 IFL season
- League: Indoor Football League
- Sport: Indoor football
- Duration: April 23 – September 12
- Teams: 12
- Season MVP: Drew Powell (Arizona)
- Finals champions: Massachusetts Pirates
- Runners-up: Arizona Rattlers
- Finals MVP: Alejandro Bennifield

IFL seasons
- ← 2020 2022 →

The 2021 Indoor Football League season was the thirteenth (and twelfth complete) season of the Indoor Football League (IFL). The league played the season with twelve teams, down from thirteen the previous season, by adding one expansion team, one team from the National Arena League, one team from the American Arena League, and four teams going on hiatus. In addition, three existing teams made their IFL on-field debut after the 2020 season was cancelled because of the COVID-19 pandemic.

As there were still many pandemic-related restrictions still in place during early 2021, the start of the season was delayed from February to April with the postseason to begin in August. The top eight teams qualified for the postseason with the Massachusetts Pirates, playing their first season in the IFL, defeating the Arizona Rattlers in the United Bowl on September 12.

== Offseason ==
On June 26, 2020, the Columbus Wild Dogs announced that they would not begin play until 2022. On August 19, 2020, the Massachusetts Pirates, formerly of the National Arena League, were added to the IFL for the 2021 season as the league's first East Coast-based team. On August 25, the league added the Northern Arizona Wranglers in Prescott Valley, Arizona, for the 2021 season, joining the Arizona Rattlers and Tucson Sugar Skulls as the third IFL team to be based in Arizona for 2021. On November 6, the Louisville Xtreme of Louisville, Kentucky, was added. The 2020 expansion Oakland Panthers, as well as the Cedar Rapids River Kings, Quad City Steamwheelers, and the San Diego Strike Force withdrew from the season due to the effects of the pandemic.

The initial schedule for the twelve teams was announced on November 17, 2020, with all teams playing 16 games between March 28 and July 24, 2021, before the playoffs. On February 17, the league pushed back its start date to April 23 for four teams, with the rest of the teams to start on May 14. The four teams that started on April 23 were to still have 16 games, but the others teams were to play a reduced 14-game schedule.

== Teams ==
Team	Location	Arena	Capacity	Founded	Joined	Head coach
Arizona Rattlers	Phoenix, Arizona	Footprint Center (Note: Was known as Phoenix Suns Arena at the start of the season until July 16, 2021.)	18,422	1992	2017	Kevin Guy
Bismarck Bucks	Bismarck, North Dakota	Bismarck Event Center	10,100	2017	2019	Rod Miller
Duke City Gladiators	Rio Rancho, New Mexico	Rio Rancho Events Center	6,000	2015	2020	Martino Theus (until June 30); Robert Kent Jr.
Frisco Fighters	Frisco, Texas	Comerica Center	3,500	2019	2020	Clint Dolezel
Green Bay Blizzard	Green Bay, Wisconsin	Resch Center	8,600	2003	2010	Corey Roberson
Iowa Barnstormers	Des Moines, Iowa	Wells Fargo Arena	15,181	1995	2015	Les Moss
Louisville Xtreme	Louisville, Kentucky	KFC Yum! Center	22,090	2012	2021	Mark Stoute
Massachusetts Pirates	Worcester, Massachusetts	DCU Center	12,339	2017	2021	Patrick Pass
Northern Arizona Wranglers	Prescott Valley, Arizona	Findlay Toyota Center	6,000	2020	2021	Dominic Bramante
Sioux Falls Storm	Sioux Falls, South Dakota	Denny Sanford Premier Center	10,678	2000	2009	Kurtiss Riggs
Spokane Shock	Spokane, Washington	Spokane Veterans Memorial Arena	10,771	2006	2020	Billy Back
Tucson Sugar Skulls	Tucson, Arizona	Tucson Convention Center	8,962	2018	2019	Dixie Wooten

== Regular season ==
=== Standings ===
Team	W	L	PCT	PF	PA
y – Arizona Rattlers	12	2	.857	708	535
x – Massachusetts Pirates	11	3	.786	627	455
x – Frisco Fighters	10	3	.769	532	485
x – Duke City Gladiators	7	7	.500	741	661
x – Iowa Barnstormers	6	6	.500	499	483
x – Spokane Shock	6	6	.500	520	486
x – Bismarck Bucks	7	8	.467	613	616
x – Sioux Falls Storm	6	7	.462	569	558
Tucson Sugar Skulls	6	8	.429	574	597
Green Bay Blizzard	5	9	.357	494	569
Northern Arizona Wranglers	1	13	.071	443	736
Louisville Xtreme (Note: Terminated midseason)	0	5	.000	153	223
(y) clinched regular season title • (x) clinched playoff spot Final standings (Note: Standings reflect overall winning percentage per the official IFL source, but are not based on playoff seeds due to tiebreakers.) • Source

=== Schedule ===
The season began on the weekend of April 23–24 with two games: the Bismarck Bucks at the Green Bay Blizzard and the Massachusetts Pirates at the Louisville Xtreme. The four teams were the only teams playing until May 15 when the other teams joined. After initially postponing the Xtreme's June 12 home game, the IFL subsequently terminated the Xtreme's membership due to failing to maintain the league's minimum obligations and the team did not finish the season. All of the Xtreme's games were removed from the schedule.

Week	Date	Visitor	Score	Home	Venue
1	April 23	Bismarck Bucks	41–35	Green Bay Blizzard	Resch Center
1	April 24	Massachusetts Pirates	49–18	Louisville Xtreme	KFC Yum! Center
2	May 2	Massachusetts Pirates	36–40	Green Bay Blizzard	Resch Center
3	May 7	Louisville Xtreme	29–49	Green Bay Blizzard	Resch Center
3	May 8	Massachusetts Pirates	36–18	Bismarck Bucks	Bismarck Event Center
4	May 15	Green Bay Blizzard	46–58	Bismarck Bucks	Bismarck Event Center
4	May 15	Iowa Barnstormers	56–36	Sioux Falls Storm	Denny Sanford Premier Center
4	May 15	Frisco Fighters	36–33	Spokane Shock	Spokane Arena
4	May 16	Arizona Rattlers	51–20	Northern Arizona Wranglers	Findlay Toyota Center
5	May 21	Tucson Sugar Skulls	36–42	Green Bay Blizzard	Resch Center
5	May 22	Frisco Fighters	34–26	Louisville Xtreme	KFC Yum! Center
5	May 22	Northern Arizona Wranglers	39–61	Bismarck Bucks	Bismarck Event Center
5	May 22	Duke City Gladiators	63–55 OT	Iowa Barnstormers	Wells Fargo Arena
5	May 22	Arizona Rattlers	46–50	Sioux Falls Storm	Denny Sanford Premier Center
5	May 22	Spokane Shock	34–26	Massachusetts Pirates	DCU Center
6	May 29	Sioux Falls Storm	49–43	Louisville Xtreme	KFC Yum! Center
6	May 29	Bismarck Bucks	42–49	Iowa Barnstormers	Wells Fargo Arena
6	May 30	Tucson Sugar Skulls	55–35	Duke City Gladiators	Rio Rancho Events Center
7	June 4	Arizona Rattlers	41–34	Green Bay Blizzard	Resch Center
7	June 5	Louisville Xtreme	37–42	Massachusetts Pirates	DCU Center
7	June 5	Sioux Falls Storm	64–28	Bismarck Bucks	Bismarck Event Center
7	June 5	Iowa Barnstormers	33–13	Tucson Sugar Skulls	Tucson Convention Center
7	June 5	Spokane Shock	42–24	Northern Arizona Wranglers	Findlay Toyota Center
7	June 5	Duke City Gladiators	57–58	Frisco Fighters	Comerica Center
8	June 12	Iowa Barnstormers	22–53	Bismarck Bucks	Bismarck Event Center
8	~~June 12~~	~~Green Bay Blizzard~~	Ppd.	~~Louisville Xtreme~~	~~KFC Yum! Center~~
8	June 12	Tucson Sugar Skulls	34–44	Arizona Rattlers	Phoenix Suns Arena
8	June 12	Duke City Gladiators	34–17	Northern Arizona Wranglers	Findlay Toyota Center
8	June 12	Spokane Shock	50–32	Sioux Falls Storm	Denny Sanford Premier Center
8	June 12	Frisco Fighters	40–33	Massachusetts Pirates	DCU Center
9	June 18	Bismarck Bucks	50–29	Green Bay Blizzard	Resch Center
9	June 19	Arizona Rattlers	51–36	Duke City Gladiators	Rio Rancho Events Center
9	~~June 19~~	~~Louisville Xtreme~~	X	~~Frisco Fighters~~	~~Comerica Center~~
9	June 19	Massachusetts Pirates	37–34	Tucson Sugar Skulls	Tucson Convention Center
9	June 19	Sioux Falls Storm	47–57	Iowa Barnstormers	Wells Fargo Arena
9	June 19	Northern Arizona Wranglers	37–63	Spokane Shock	Spokane Arena
10	June 25	Iowa Barnstormers	44–48	Green Bay Blizzard	Resch Center
10	June 25	Spokane Shock	35–56	Arizona Rattlers	Phoenix Suns Arena
10	June 26	Frisco Fighters	53–48	Duke City Gladiators	Rio Rancho Events Center
10	June 26	Bismarck Bucks	27–52	Sioux Falls Storm	Denny Sanford Premier Center
10	June 26	Tucson Sugar Skulls	44–48	Northern Arizona Wranglers	Findlay Toyota Center
10	~~June 27~~	~~Massachusetts Pirates~~	X	~~Louisville Xtreme~~	~~KFC Yum! Center~~
11	July 2	Massachusetts Pirates	38–37	Frisco Fighters	Comerica Center
11	~~July 3~~	~~Spokane Shock~~	X	~~Louisville Xtreme~~	~~KFC Yum! Center~~
11	July 3	Northern Arizona Wranglers	38–52	Duke City Gladiators	Rio Rancho Events Center
11	July 3	Arizona Rattlers	54–38	Tucson Sugar Skulls	Tucson Convention Center
12	July 9	Iowa Barnstormers	35–42	Frisco Fighters	Comerica Center
12	July 10	Bismarck Bucks	38–43	Massachusetts Pirates	DCU Center
12	~~July 10~~	~~Green Bay Blizzard~~	X	~~Louisville Xtreme~~	~~KFC Yum! Center~~
12	July 10	Northern Arizona Wranglers	19–62	Arizona Rattlers	Phoenix Suns Arena
12	July 10	Duke City Gladiators	40–41	Tucson Sugar Skulls	Tucson Sugar Skulls
12	July 10	Sioux Falls Storm	35–46	Spokane Shock	Spokane Arena
13	July 16	Frisco Fighters	42–43	Bismarck Bucks	Bismarck Event Center
13	~~July 17~~	~~Louisville Xtreme~~	X	~~Iowa Barnstormers~~	~~Wells Fargo Arena~~
13	July 17	Duke City Gladiators	71–54	Northern Arizona Wranglers	Findlay Toyota Center
13	July 17	Tucson Sugar Skulls	34–45	Spokane Shock	Spokane Arena
13	July 18	Arizona Rattlers	44–68	Massachusetts Pirates	DCU Center
13	July 18	Sioux Falls Storm	31–21	Green Bay Blizzard	Resch Center
14	~~July 24~~	~~Louisville Xtreme~~	X	~~Massachusetts Pirates~~	~~DCU Center~~
14	July 24	Green Bay Blizzard	34–26	Iowa Barnstormers	Wells Fargo Arena
14	July 24	Northern Arizona Wranglers	30–33	Frisco Fighters	Comerica Center
14	July 24	Spokane Shock	61–68	Duke City Gladiators	Rio Rancho Events Center
14	July 24	Sioux Falls Storm	33–59	Arizona Rattlers	Footprint Center (Note: Was known as Phoenix Suns Arena at the start of the season until July 16, 2021.)
14	July 24	Bismarck Bucks	27–34	Tucson Sugar Skulls	Tucson Convention Center
15	July 30	Green Bay Blizzard	30–41	Bismarck Bucks	Bismarck Event Center
15	~~July 31~~	~~Iowa Barnstormers~~	X	~~Louisville Xtreme~~	~~KFC Yum! Center~~
15	July 31	Duke City Gladiators	48–60	Arizona Rattlers	Footprint Center
15	July 31	Northern Arizona Wranglers	46–48	Tucson Sugar Skulls	Tucson Convention Center
15	July 31	Frisco Fighters	37–33	Sioux Falls Storm	Denny Sanford Premier Center
15	July 31	Massachusetts Pirates	63–57	Spokane Shock	Spokane Arena
16	August 7	Green Bay Blizzard	33–50	Massachusetts Pirates	DCU Center
16	~~August 7~~	~~Louisville Xtreme~~	X	~~Sioux Falls Storm~~	~~Denny Sanford Premier Center~~
16	August 7	Tucson Sugar Skulls	28–55	Arizona Rattlers	Footprint Center
16	August 7	Northern Arizona Wranglers	11–71	Duke City Gladiators	Rio Rancho Events Center
16	August 7	Spokane Shock	34–45	Frisco Fighters	Comerica Center
16	August 7	Bismarck Bucks	41–48	Iowa Barnstormers	Wells Fargo Arena
17	~~August 13~~	~~Sioux Falls Storm~~	X	~~Bismarck Bucks~~	~~Bismarck Event Center~~
17	August 13	Arizona Rattlers	30–20	Spokane Shock	Spokane Arena
17	August 14	Duke City Gladiators	59–63	Tucson Sugar Skulls	Tucson Convention Center
17	~~August 14~~	~~Louisville Xtreme~~	X	~~Iowa Barnstormers~~	~~Wells Fargo Arena~~
17	August 14	Sioux Falls Storm	49–55	Iowa Barnstormers	Wells Fargo Arena
17	August 14	Green Bay Blizzard	20–38	Frisco Fighters	Comerica Center
17	August 15	Massachusetts Pirates	51–16	Northern Arizona Wranglers	Findlay Toyota Center
18	August 21	Tucson Sugar Skulls	56–38	Northern Arizona Wranglers	Findlay Toyota Center
18	August 21	Green Bay Blizzard	35–58	Sioux Falls Storm	Denny Sanford Premier Center
18	August 21	Frisco Fighters	38–55	Arizona Rattlers	Footprint Center
18	August 21	Bismarck Bucks	45–57	Duke City Gladiators	Rio Rancho Events Center
18	August 21	Iowa Barnstormers	19–55	Massachusetts Pirates	DCU Center
18	~~August 21~~	~~Louisville Xtreme~~	X	~~Spokane Shock~~	~~Spokane Arena~~

== Playoffs ==
The top eight teams made the IFL playoffs, where teams were ranked by winning percentage due to the imbalanced schedule. After Louisville was terminated midseason, the schedule was further imbalanced leading to several tiebreaker parameters needing to be used resulting in the fourth place Duke City Gladiators and fifth place Iowa Barnstormers switching seeding for the playoffs.

The quarterfinals consisted of the top seed hosting the eighth seed, the second seed hosting the seventh seed, the third seed hosting the sixth seed, and the fourth hosting the fifth seed. In the semifinals, the highest remaining seed hosts the lower remaining seed and the next-highest hosts the next-lowest from the quarterfinals. The semifinal winners then meet in the 2021 United Bowl.

First round (August 28–29)
8	Sioux Falls	42
1	Arizona	69
7	Bismarck	19
2	Massachusetts	44
(Pairings are reseeded after the first round)
6	Spokane	33
3	Frisco	44
5	Duke City	34
4	Iowa	33

Semifinals (September 4–5)
5	Duke City	55
1	Arizona	58
3	Frisco	22
2	Massachusetts	43

United Bowl (September 12)
2	Massachusetts	37
1	Arizona	34
