= 2022 Indoor Football League season =

2022 IFL season
- League: Indoor Football League
- Sport: Indoor football
- Duration: March 12 – August 13
- Teams: 14
- Season MVP: Drew Powell
- Finals champions: Northern Arizona Wranglers
- Runners-up: Quad City Steamwheelers
- Finals MVP: JaQuan Artis

IFL seasons
- ← 2021 2023 →

The 2022 Indoor Football League season was the fourteenth (and thirteenth complete) season of the Indoor Football League (IFL). The league played the season with 14 teams, up from 11 teams the previous season. The Bay Area Panthers, Quad City Steamwheelers, and San Diego Strike Force, returned from dormancy after electing not to play during the 2021 season due to the COVID-19 pandemic. The Vegas Knight Hawks joined the league as an expansion team. The Cedar Rapids River Kings did not return and the announced 2022 expansion Columbus Wild Dogs never returned. The Spokane Shock were removed from the league in February 2022 after the team lost its lease for their home arena.

In the national championship round the Northern Arizona Wranglers won their first title by defeating the Quad City Steamwheelers. In doing so the Wranglers completed a worst to first comeback having won only one game (against the Tucson Sugar Skulls) the previous season.

== Teams ==
For the 2022 season, the league is split into two conferences.

The playoffs will have the top four teams per conference qualifying, and will be seeded first through fourth.

Team	Location	Arena	Capacity	Founded	Joined	Head coach
Eastern Conference
Bismarck Bucks	Bismarck, North Dakota	Bismarck Event Center	10,100	2017	2019	Rod Miller
Frisco Fighters	Frisco, Texas	Comerica Center	3,500	2019	2020	Billy Back
Green Bay Blizzard	Green Bay, Wisconsin	Resch Center	8,600	2003	2010	Corey Roberson
Iowa Barnstormers	Des Moines, Iowa	Wells Fargo Arena	15,181	1995	2015	Dave Mogensen
Massachusetts Pirates	Worcester, Massachusetts	DCU Center	12,339	2017	2021	Rayshaun Kizer
Quad City Steamwheelers	Moline, Illinois	Vibrant Arena at The Mark	9,200	2017	2019	Cory Ross
Sioux Falls Storm	Sioux Falls, South Dakota	Denny Sanford Premier Center	10,678	2000	2009	Kurtiss Riggs
Western Conference
Arizona Rattlers	Phoenix, Arizona	Footprint Center	18,422	1992	2017	Kevin Guy
Bay Area Panthers	San Jose, California	SAP Center	17,562	2019	2020	Kurt Bryan
Duke City Gladiators	Rio Rancho, New Mexico	Rio Rancho Events Center	6,000	2015	2020	Sherman Carter
Northern Arizona Wranglers	Prescott Valley, Arizona	Findlay Toyota Center	6,000	2020	2021	Les Moss
San Diego Strike Force	San Diego, California	Pechanga Arena	12,000	2018	2019	David Beezer
Tucson Sugar Skulls	Tucson, Arizona	Tucson Arena	8,962	2018	2019	Dixie Wooten
Vegas Knight Hawks	Henderson, Nevada	Dollar Loan Center	6,019	2021	2022	Mike Davis

== Regular season ==
=== Standings ===
==== Eastern Conference ====
Team	W	L	PCT	GB	CONF	STK	PF	PA
Frisco Fighters	14	2	.867	-	7–1	W8	737	562
Massachusetts Pirates	11	5	.667	3	8–2	W1	612	556
Quad City Steamwheelers (Note: Quad City finished ahead of Iowa based on head-to-head victory.)	9	7	.563	5	8–7	W1	664	642
Iowa Barnstormers	9	7	.563	5	8–7	L1	642	605
Sioux Falls Storm	8	8	.533	6	7–7	W1	643	646
Green Bay Blizzard	6	10	.375	8	5–10	L2	518	558
Bismarck Bucks	3	13	.188	11	2–11	L11	529	678

==== Western Conference ====
Team	W	L	PCT	GB	CONF	STK	PF	PA
Arizona Rattlers	13	3	.813	-	11–2	W4	846	500
Northern Arizona Wranglers	12	4	.800	1	11–3	W1	622	447
Tucson Sugar Skulls	9	7	.533	4	8–5	L1	732	747
Duke City Gladiators	8	8	.467	5	6–5	W1	644	655
Vegas Knight Hawks	6	10	.375	7	5–7	L1	586	617
San Diego Strike Force	3	13	.200	10	2–11	L2	580	749
Bay Area Panthers	1	15	.067	12	1–11	L14	431	824

==== Notes ====
(Note: The procedure used to determine tiebreakers is: 1) Conference record 2) Head-to-head record, 3) Strength of schedule, 4) Head-to-head point differential, and 5) Overall point differential)

== Playoffs ==
First round (July 22–24)
E3	Quad City	39
E2	Massachusetts	38
E4	Iowa	39
E1	Frisco	64
W3	Tucson	30
W2	Northern Arizona	49
W4	Duke City	14
W1	Arizona	53

Second round (July 29–30)
E3	Quad City	48
E1	Frisco	41
W2	Northern Arizona	52
W1	Arizona	51

National Championship (August 13)
E3	Quad City	45
W2	Northern Arizona	47

== See also ==
- 2022 National Arena League season
