= Frisco Fighters =

Indoor football team

- Current season
- Logo
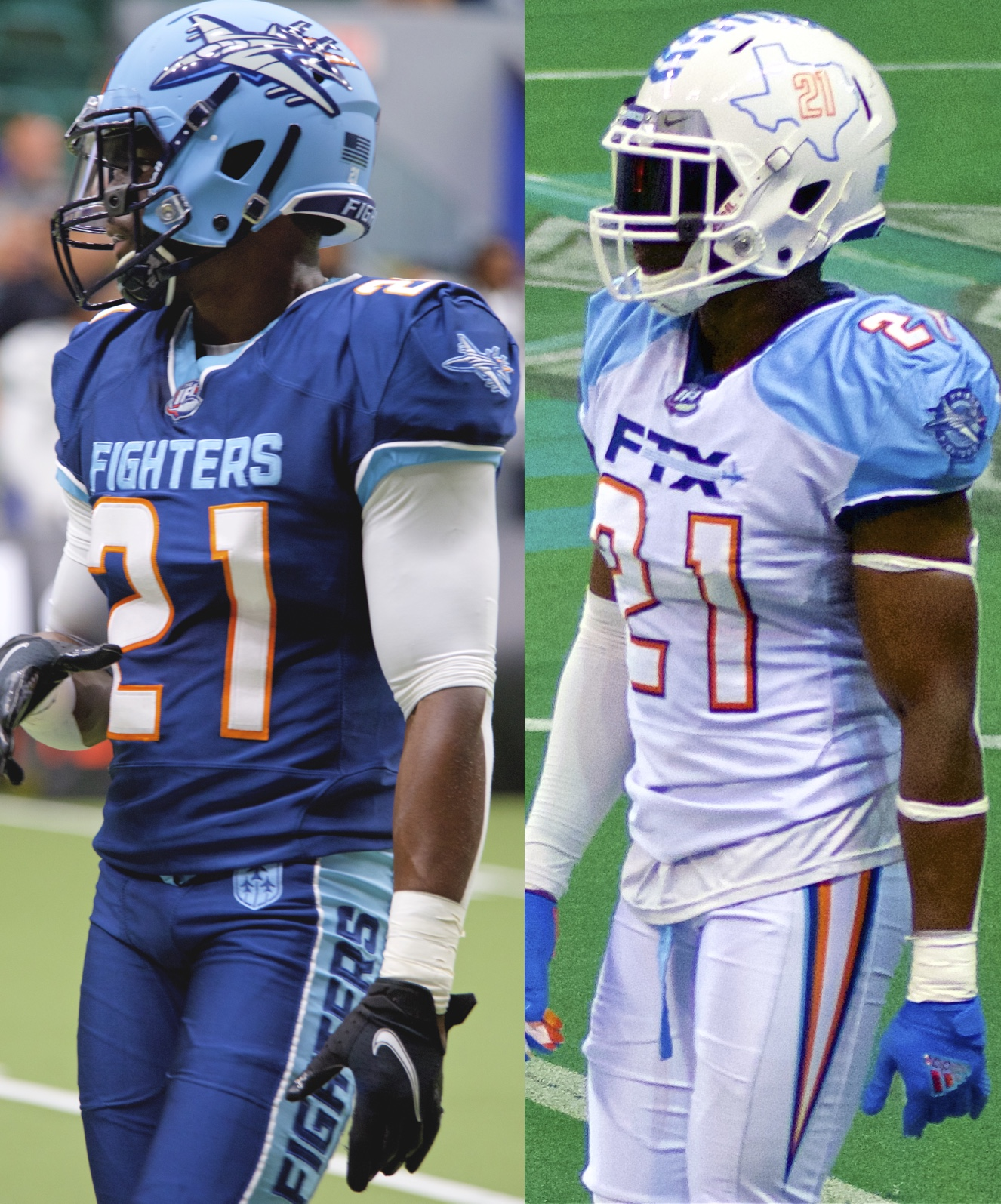
- Uniforms

General information
- Founded: 2019; 7 years ago
- Headquartered: Frisco, Texas at the Comerica Center
- Colors: Navy blue, sky blue, orange, silver, white
- FriscoFighters.com

Personnel
- Owners: The Germain family (Steve, Kim, Jessica, Austin & Zach Germain)
- Head coach: Andre Coles

Team history
- Frisco Fighters (2020–present)

Home fields
- Comerica Center (2020–present)

League / conference affiliations
- Indoor Football League (2020–present); Eastern Conference (2022–present)

Championships
- Division championships: 2: 2022, 2023

Playoff appearances (4)
- 2021, 2022, 2023, 2024

The Frisco Fighters are an inactive professional indoor football team based in Frisco, Texas. A member of the Indoor Football League, the Fighters play their home games at the Comerica Center. The team was set to participate in the 2020 season, but were unable to play due to the COVID-19 pandemic. The team sat out the 2025 and 2026 seasons, with no public plans to return.

== History ==
=== Founding and 2020 season ===
The Frisco Fighters are the third indoor football team to play in Frisco following the Intense Football League's Frisco Thunder (2007–2008) and Champions Indoor Football's Texas Revolution (2018–2019). The Texas Revolution played in Frisco as a Champions Indoor Football team from 2017 until early 2019, when their membership in that league was terminated. On November 24, 2019, the IFL announced it would debut a new expansion team in Frisco, owned by automobile dealer Steve Germain and his family.

On December 11, the new Frisco franchise revealed their new team name as the "Frisco Fighters", along with their logo, color scheme, and coaching staff. The TEAM Management, LLC was retained to manage operating the Fighters. Arena football veteran Clint Dolezel (best known for his time as quarterback of the Grand Rapids Rampage and Dallas Desperados) was announced as the team's inaugural head coach. In February 2020, the Fighters added former Dallas Cowboys' wide receiver Drew Pearson as chief relationships officer and an analyst for all the Fighters' televised games.

The IFL completed two games in the 2020 season before the entire season was postponed due to the COVID-19 pandemic, without the Fighters playing a game. The Fighters' inaugural season was eventually cancelled outright. The Fighters continued to advertise on local after their season was cancelled, and engaged in community contributions.

=== 2021 season ===
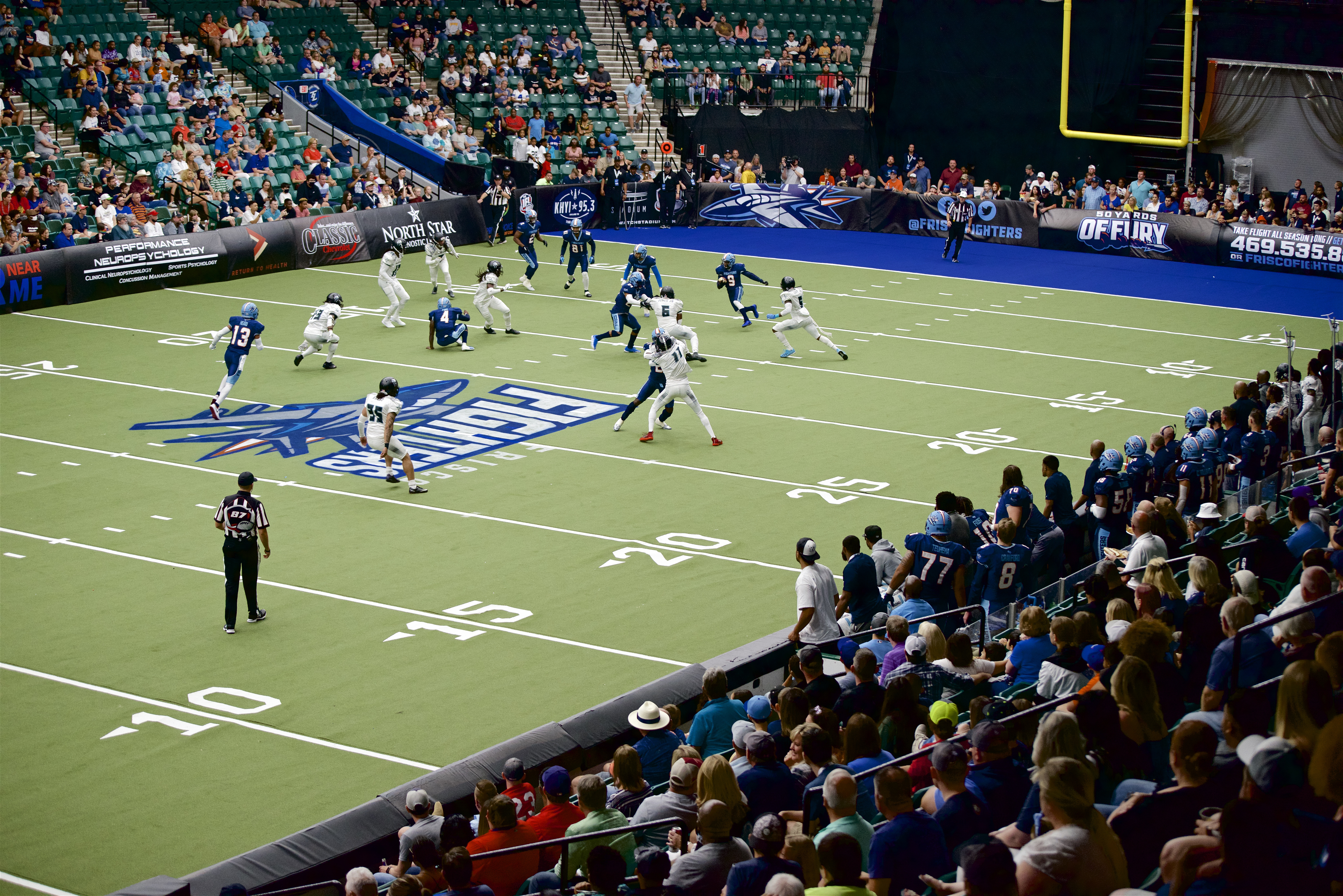
The Fighters' 2021 home opener at the Comerica Center.

The Fighters played their first game on May 15, 2021, on the road in a 36–33 win over the relaunched Spokane Shock. Near the end of the 2021 season, head coach Dolezel was signed to a multi-year extension after leading to the team to a 10–2 record. The team then finished with a 10–3 record and advanced to the playoffs, making it to the league semifinal, where they lost to the Massachusetts Pirates 43–22.

=== 2022 season ===
After the 2021 season ended, Dolezel left the team to pursue other opportunities, and was replaced by former Spokane Shock head coach Billy Back. Also during the off-season, the Germain family and the Dallas Stars of the National Hockey League jointly announced a new partnership, which replaced the Fighters' 2020–21 business management team with the Dallas Stars organization for the 2022 season.

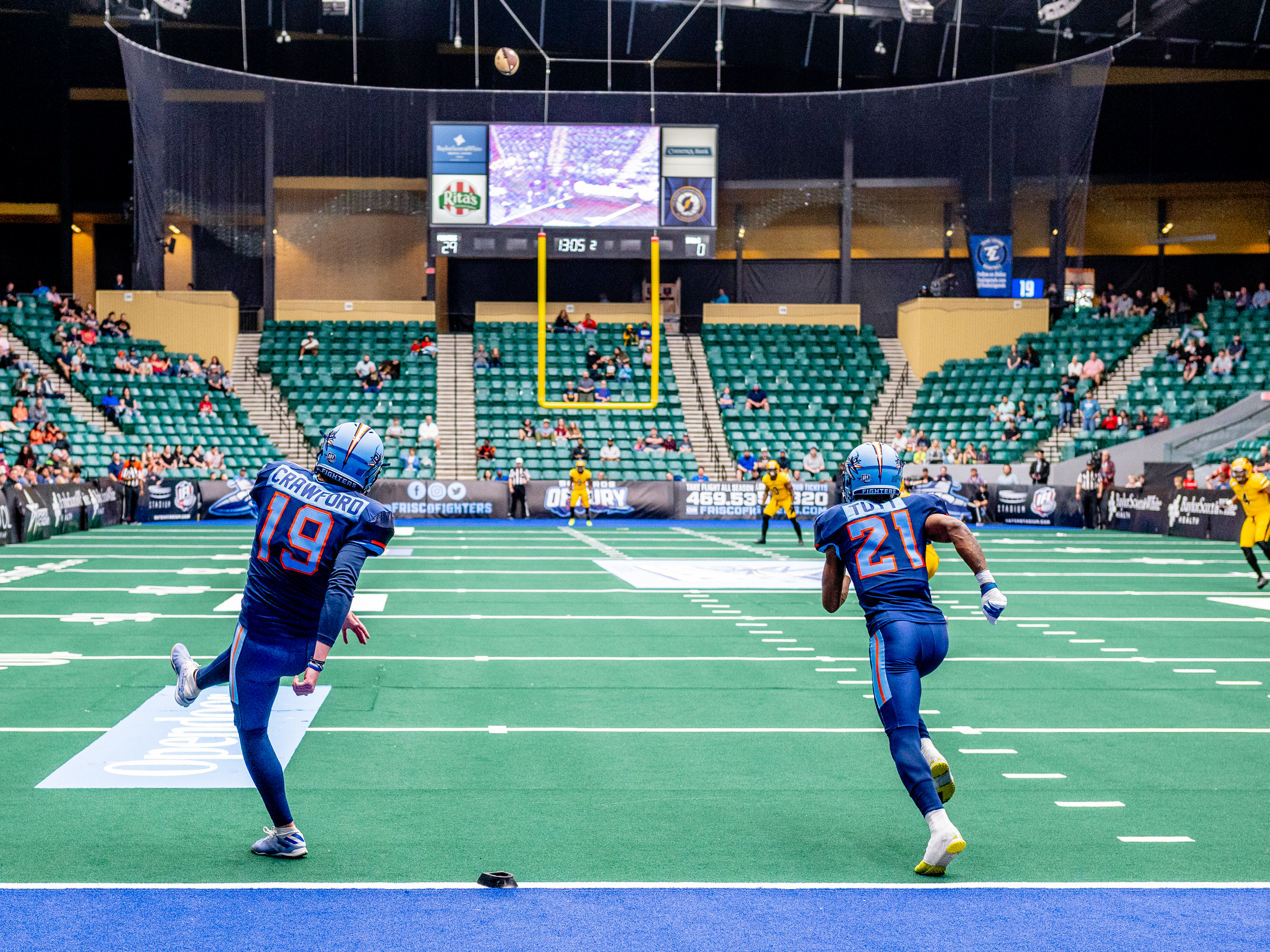
A 2022 Frisco Fighters home game.

The Fighters opened the 2022 season on March 12 on the road against the 2021 IFL champion Massachusetts Pirates, and were initially scheduled to play their first 2022 home game on April 1 against the Bismarck Bucks. However, due to the collapse of the Spokane Shock franchise in February, the IFL revised its schedule, moving the Fighters' first home game up to March 26 against the Duke City Gladiators. Frisco finished the regular season with a 14–2 record, the best record in the Eastern Conference, advancing to the playoffs for the second year in a row.

After winning a playoff quarterfinal game against the Iowa Barnstormers, the Fighters were eliminated in the conference championship with a 48–41 loss to the Quad City Steamwheelers.

== Season-by-season results ==
League champions	Conference champions	Playoff berth

Season	League	Conference	Regular season			Postseason results
Season	League	Conference	Finish	Wins	Losses	Postseason results
2020	IFL	Season cancelled due to the COVID-19 pandemic				
2021	IFL		3rd	10	3	Won First round (Spokane) 44–43; Lost Second round (Massachusetts) 43–22
2022	IFL	Eastern	1st	14	2	Won First round (Iowa) 64–39; Lost Second round (Quad City) 48–41
2023	IFL	Eastern	1st	13	2	Won First round (Quad City) 57–29; Lost Second round (Sioux Falls) 45–44
2024	IFL	Eastern	2nd	13	3	Lost First round (Massachusetts) 50–53
Totals				50	10	All-time regular season record
Totals				3	4	All-time postseason record
Totals				53	14	All-time regular season and postseason record

== Notable players ==
See Category:Frisco Fighters players
