= Bismarck Event Center =

Multi-purpose facility in Bismarck, North Dakota, USA

Coordinates: 46°48′8.80″N 100°46′59.82″W

- Interactive map of Bismarck Event Center
- Former names: Bismarck Civic Center (1969–2014)
- Location: 315 South 5th Street, Bismarck, ND 58504
- Capacity: 10,100
- Public transit: Bis-Man Transit

Construction
- Groundbreaking: 1967
- Opened: 1969
- Architect: Ritterbush Brothers
- Builders: Anderson, Guthrie & Carlson

Tenants
- Bismarck Bobcats (AFHL) (1997–1998); Bismarck Blaze (IFL) (2000); Bismarck Bucks (CIF/IFL) (2017–2022)

The Bismarck Event Center (formerly Bismarck Civic Center) is a 10,100-seat multi-purpose facility located in Bismarck, North Dakota. It was known as the Bismarck Civic Center until September 2014. Ritterbush Brothers received an Award of Merit for the design from AIA North Dakota in 1970.

The land was purchased from the Wachter family of Bismarck, who also donated land for parking lots adjacent to the civic center. The Wachters then developed the adjacent Kirkwood Mall on their land south of the arena.

It hosted the 2002 Ford World Men's Curling Championship. For several years, the Professional Bull Riders (PBR) has hosted a Touring Pro Division (minor-league division, formerly known as the Challenger Tour) event at the Civic Center; in 2004, it was voted as the top PBR Challenger Tour venue.

The venue hosted a number of professional boxing events in the early 1990s, headlined by WBA light heavyweight champion, Virgil Hill, who grew up in North Dakota. Hill hosted eight title defenses in the Civic Center, which he considered to provide a significant 'hometown' advantage.

In 2017, the event center became the home to a new professional indoor football team in Champions Indoor Football called the Bismarck Bucks. The Bucks joined the Indoor Football League for the 2019 season.
