= 2023 Indoor Football League season =

2023 IFL season
- League: Indoor Football League
- Sport: Indoor football
- Duration: March 17 – August 5
- Teams: 14
- TV partners: Broadcast; CBS Sports; Live streaming; YouTube

Regular season
- Season champions: Frisco Fighters
- Season MVP: TJ Edwards, QB, FRI

Playoffs
- Eastern champions: Sioux Falls Storm
- Eastern runners-up: Frisco Fighters
- Western champions: Bay Area Panthers
- Western runners-up: Northern Arizona Wranglers

2023 IFL National Championship
- Champions: Bay Area Panthers
- Runners-up: Sioux Falls Storm
- Finals MVP: Dalton Sneed, QB, BA

IFL seasons
- ← 2022 2024 →

The 2023 Indoor Football League season was the fifteenth season of the Indoor Football League (IFL). It was the first year of the IFL and the XFL player personnel partnership, with the IFL functioning as their de facto minor league.

== Offseason ==
The league added one expansion team, the Tulsa Oilers. The Bismarck Bucks suspended operations.

== Rule changes ==
For the 2023 season, the IFL announced the following rule changes:

- The Deuce kick rule will now be in effect during the entire game.
- The ball is considered "live" if the kickoff hits the uprights or goalposts and comes back into the field of play.
- The 25 second play clock will begin after the ball is spotted.
- Positive yardage rule in the last 60 seconds of the game has been eliminated.

== Standings ==
Eastern Conference
| Team | W | L | PCT | CONF | PF | PA |
|---|---|---|---|---|---|---|
| Frisco Fighters | 13 | 2 | .867 | 7–1 | 797 | 571 |
| Sioux Falls Storm (Note: Sioux Falls, Massachusetts, and Quad City are ranked in that order based on conference record.) | 9 | 6 | .600 | 9–5 | 706 | 656 |
| Massachusetts Pirates | 9 | 6 | .600 | 7–4 | 751 | 702 |
| Quad City Steamwheelers | 9 | 6 | .600 | 8–5 | 741 | 698 |
| Green Bay Blizzard | 7 | 8 | .467 | 6–7 | 701 | 706 |
| Iowa Barnstormers | 3 | 12 | .200 | 3–11 | 593 | 788 |
| Tulsa Oilers | 2 | 13 | .133 | 2–9 | 601 | 721 |

Western Conference
| Team | W | L | PCT | CONF | PF | PA |
|---|---|---|---|---|---|---|
| Arizona Rattlers | 11 | 4 | .733 | 9–3 | 820 | 698 |
| Bay Area Panthers | 10 | 5 | .667 | 8–3 | 777 | 660 |
| Tucson Sugar Skulls | 9 | 6 | .600 | 7–6 | 661 | 613 |
| Northern Arizona Wranglers | 7 | 8 | .467 | 6–7 | 553 | 593 |
| San Diego Strike Force | 6 | 9 | .400 | 5–6 | 665 | 762 |
| Duke City Gladiators (Note: Duke City finished ahead of Vegas based on conference record.) | 5 | 10 | .333 | 4–8 | 628 | 734 |
| Vegas Knight Hawks | 5 | 10 | .333 | 3–9 | 654 | 726 |

Notes (Note: The procedure used to determine tiebreakers is: 1) Conference record 2) Head-to-head record, 3) Strength of schedule, 4) Head-to-head point differential, and 5) Overall point differential)

== Season structure ==
=== Regular season ===
The regular season for 2023 was played across 18 weeks with teams playing 15 games each. Each team also had two bye weeks, with Arizona, Quad City, Frisco, and Green Bay earning three bye weeks after playing the opening weekend.

=== Postseason ===
The top four teams from both the Eastern and Western Conferences played each other with the top two seeds getting home-field advantage for round one. In the conference championships, the previous winners of round one faced off with the higher seed getting home field advantage. The 2023 IFL National Championship was then between the conference champions with the game being played at the Dollar Loan Center on August 5, 2023.

== Season schedule ==
=== Week 1 ===
| Date | Time | Home team | Result | | Away team | Stadium | Ref |
|---|---|---|---|---|---|---|---|
| March 17 | 7:05 p.m. CT | Quad City Steamwheelers | 53 | 60 | Arizona Rattlers | Vibrant Arena at The MARK | |
| March 19 | 3:05 p.m. CT | Green Bay Blizzard | 30 | 76 | Frisco Fighters | Resch Center | |

=== Week 2 ===
| Date | Time | Home team | Result | | Away team | Stadium | Ref |
|---|---|---|---|---|---|---|---|
| March 24 | 7:05 p.m. CT | Frisco Fighters | 35 | 13 | Tulsa Oilers | Comerica Center | |
| March 25 | 8:05 p.m. CT | Northern Arizona Wranglers | 35 | 43 | Duke City Gladiators | Findlay Toyota Center | |
| March 25 | 9:05 p.m. CT | Vegas Knight Hawks | 57 | 44 | Iowa Barnstormers | Dollar Loan Center | |
| March 26 | 12:05 p.m. CT | Massachusetts Pirates | 55 | 41 | Green Bay Blizzard | DCU Center | |
| March 26 | 5:05 p.m. CT | San Diego Strike Force | 47 | 49 | Quad City Steamwheelers | Pechanga Arena | |
| March 26 | 7:05 p.m. CT | Bay Area Panthers | 47 | 46 | Arizona Rattlers | SAP Center | |

=== Week 3 ===
| Date | Time | Home team | Result | | Away team | Stadium | Ref |
|---|---|---|---|---|---|---|---|
| March 31 | 6:05 p.m. CT | Green Bay Blizzard | 44 | 25 | Iowa Barnstormers | Resch Center | |
| April 1 | 7:05 p.m. CT | Quad City Steamwheelers | 36 | 34 | Sioux Falls Storm | Vibrant Arena at The MARK | |
| April 1 | 7:05 p.m. CT | Duke City Gladiators | 55 | 60 | Frisco Fighters | Rio Rancho Events Center | |
| April 1 | 8:05 p.m. CT | Northern Arizona Wranglers | 48 | 42 | Vegas Knight Hawks | Findlay Toyota Center | |
| April 2 | 12:05 p.m. CT | Massachusetts Pirates | 59 | 52 | Bay Area Panthers | DCU Center | |
| April 3 | 8:05 p.m. CT | San Diego Strike Force | 16 | 35 | Tucson Sugar Skulls | Pechanga Arena | |

=== Week 4 ===
| Date | Time | Home team | Result | | Away team | Stadium | Ref |
|---|---|---|---|---|---|---|---|
| April 8 | 7:05 p.m. CT | Duke City Gladiators | 57 | 36 | Tulsa Oilers | Rio Rancho Events Center | |
| April 8 | 8:05 p.m. CT | Arizona Rattlers | 48 | 54 | Tucson Sugar Skulls | Footprint Center | |
| April 8 | 9:05 p.m. CT | Vegas Knight Hawks | 36 | 37 | San Diego Strike Force | Dollar Loan Center | |
| April 9 | 5:05 p.m. CT | Sioux Falls Storm | 54 | 24 | Iowa Barnstormers | Denny Sanford Premier Center | |

=== Week 5 ===
| Date | Time | Home team | Result | | Away team | Stadium | Ref |
|---|---|---|---|---|---|---|---|
| April 15 | 7:05 p.m. CT | Frisco Fighters | 56 | 39 | Massachusetts Pirates | Comerica Center | |
| April 15 | 7:05 p.m. CT | Tulsa Oilers | 42 | 68 | Quad City Steamwheelers | BOK Center | |
| April 15 | 8:05 p.m. CT | Arizona Rattlers | 48 | 37 | Duke City Gladiators | Footprint Center | |
| April 16 | 5:05 p.m. CT | Sioux Falls Storm | 41 | 47 | Green Bay Blizzard | Denny Sanford Premier Center | |
| April 16 | 5:05 p.m. CT | Northern Arizona Wranglers | 48 | 9 | San Diego Strike Force | Findlay Toyota Center | |
| April 16 | 9:05 p.m. CT | Bay Area Panthers | 30 | 34 | Tucson Sugar Skulls | SAP Center | |

=== Week 6 ===
| Date | Time | Home team | Result | | Away team | Stadium | Ref |
|---|---|---|---|---|---|---|---|
| April 21 | 6:05 p.m. CT | Green Bay Blizzard | 47 | 55 | Sioux Falls Storm | Resch Center | |
| April 21 | 9:05 p.m. CT | Vegas Knight Hawks | 50 | 26 | Duke City Gladiators | Dollar Loan Center | |
| April 22 | 7:05 p.m. CT | Frisco Fighters | 52 | 42 | Arizona Rattlers | Comerica Center | |
| April 22 | 7:05 p.m. CT | Iowa Barnstormers | 48 | 54 | Tulsa Oilers | Wells Fargo Arena | |
| April 22 | 7:05 p.m. CT | Quad City Steamwheelers | 49 | 44 | Massachusetts Pirates | Vibrant Arena at The MARK | |
| April 22 | 8:05 p.m. CT | Tucson Sugar Skulls | 44 | 51 | San Diego Strike Force | Tucson Convention Center | |
| April 23 | 9:05 p.m. CT | Bay Area Panthers | 47 | 13 | Northern Arizona Wranglers | SAP Center | |

=== Week 7 ===
| Date | Time | Home team | Result | | Away team | Stadium | Ref |
|---|---|---|---|---|---|---|---|
| April 28 | 6:35 p.m. CT | Massachusetts Pirates | 56 | 36 | Iowa Barnstormers | DCU Center | |
| April 28 | 9:05 p.m. CT | Vegas Knight Hawks | 27 | 36 | Northern Arizona Wranglers | Dollar Loan Center | |
| April 29 | 7:05 p.m. CT | Sioux Falls Storm | 59 | 47 | Quad City Steamwheelers | Denny Sanford Premier Center | |
| April 29 | 7:05 p.m. CT | Tulsa Oilers | 46 | 53 | Arizona Rattlers | BOK Center | |
| April 30 | 5:05 p.m. CT | San Diego Strike Force | 51 | 54 | Bay Area Panthers | Pechanga Arena | |

=== Week 8 ===
| Date | Time | Home team | Result | | Away team | Stadium | Ref |
|---|---|---|---|---|---|---|---|
| May 5 | 6:05 p.m. CT | Green Bay Blizzard | 49 | 50 | Massachusetts Pirates | Resch Center | |
| May 6 | 7:05 p.m. CT | Iowa Barnstormers | 34 | 60 | Quad City Steamwheelers | Wells Fargo Arena | |
| May 6 | 7:05 p.m. CT | Sioux Falls Storm | 52 | 35 | Tulsa Oilers | Denny Sanford Premier Center | |
| May 6 | 8:05 p.m. CT | Bay Area Panthers | 44 | 62 | Vegas Knight Hawks | SAP Center | |
| May 6 | 8:05 p.m. CT | Tucson Sugar Skulls | 21 | 31 | Northern Arizona Wranglers | Tucson Convention Center | |
| May 7 | 3:05 p.m. CT | Frisco Fighters | 67 | 15 | Duke City Gladiators | Comerica Center | |

=== Week 9 ===
| Date | Time | Home team | Result | | Away team | Stadium | Ref |
|---|---|---|---|---|---|---|---|
| May 12 | 7:05 p.m. CT | Quad City Steamwheelers | 47 | 30 | Sioux Falls Storm | Vibrant Arena at The MARK | |
| May 13 | 3:05 p.m. CT | Green Bay Blizzard | 61 | 50 | San Diego Strike Force | Resch Center | |
| May 13 | 7:05 p.m. CT | Iowa Barnstormers | 73 | 43 | Massachusetts Pirates | Wells Fargo Arena | |
| May 13 | 7:05 p.m. CT | Duke City Gladiators | 56 | 49 | Tucson Sugar Skulls | Rio Rancho Events Center | |
| May 13 | 7:05 p.m. CT | Tulsa Oilers | 37 | 39 | Frisco Fighters | BOK Center | |
| May 13 | 8:05 p.m. CT | Northern Arizona Wranglers | 35 | 34 | Bay Area Panthers | Findlay Toyota Center | |
| May 13 | 9:05 p.m. CT | Vegas Knight Hawks | 55 | 54 | Arizona Rattlers | Dollar Loan Center | |

=== Week 10 ===
| Date | Time | Home team | Result | | Away team | Stadium | Ref |
|---|---|---|---|---|---|---|---|
| May 20 | 6:05 p.m. CT | Massachusetts Pirates | 63 | 49 | Quad City Steamwheelers | DCU Center | |
| May 20 | 7:05 p.m. CT | Green Bay Blizzard | 57 | 41 | Iowa Barnstormers | Resch Center | |
| May 20 | 8:05 p.m. CT | Tucson Sugar Skulls | 56 | 42 | Sioux Falls Storm | Tucson Convention Center | |
| May 20 | 8:05 p.m. CT | Arizona Rattlers | 60 | 34 | Northern Arizona Wranglers | Footprint Center | |
| May 20 | 9:05 p.m. CT | Bay Area Panthers | 62 | 55 | Frisco Fighters | SAP Center | |
| May 20 | 10:05 p.m. CT | Vegas Knight Hawks | 46 | 32 | Tulsa Oilers | Dollar Loan Center | |
| May 21 | 5:05 p.m. CT | San Diego Strike Force | 57 | 44 | Duke City Gladiators | Pechanga Arena | |

=== Week 11 ===
| Date | Time | Home team | Result | | Away team | Stadium | Ref |
|---|---|---|---|---|---|---|---|
| May 26 | 7:05 p.m. CT | Iowa Barnstormers | 26 | 77 | Sioux Falls Storm | Wells Fargo Arena | |
| May 26 | 7:05 p.m. CT | Quad City Steamwheelers | 63 | 56 | Green Bay Blizzard | Vibrant Arena at The MARK | |
| May 27 | 7:05 p.m. CT | Tulsa Oilers | 48 | 54 | Massachusetts Pirates | BOK Center | |
| May 27 | 7:05 p.m. CT | Frisco Fighters | 70 | 56 | San Diego Strike Force | Comerica Center | |
| May 27 | 7:05 p.m. CT | Duke City Gladiators | 47 | 40 | Northern Arizona Wranglers | Rio Rancho Events Center | |
| May 27 | 8:05 p.m. CT | Tucson Sugar Skulls | 42 | 44 | Bay Area Panthers | Tucson Convention Center | |
| May 27 | 8:05 p.m. CT | Arizona Rattlers | 63 | 39 | Vegas Knight Hawks | Footprint Center | |

=== Week 12 ===
| Date | Time | Home team | Result | | Away team | Stadium | Ref |
|---|---|---|---|---|---|---|---|
| June 3 | 6:05 p.m. CT | Massachusetts Pirates | 72 | 58 | Frisco Fighters | DCU Center | |
| June 3 | 7:05 p.m. CT | Iowa Barnstormers | 17 | 43 | Green Bay Blizzard | Wells Fargo Arena | |
| June 3 | 8:05 p.m. CT | Bay Area Panthers | 69 | 52 | Duke City Gladiators | SAP Center | |
| June 3 | 8:05 p.m. CT | Northern Arizona Wranglers | 62 | 63 | Arizona Rattlers | Findlay Toyota Center | |
| June 3 | 9:05 p.m. CT | Vegas Knight Hawks | 41 | 42 | Tucson Sugar Skulls | Dollar Loan Center | |
| June 4 | 5:05 p.m. CT | San Diego Strike Force | 56 | 55 | Tulsa Oilers | Pechanga Arena | |

=== Week 13 ===
| Date | Time | Home team | Result | | Away team | Stadium | Ref |
|---|---|---|---|---|---|---|---|
| June 9 | 7:05 p.m. CT | Green Bay Blizzard | 45 | 38 | Quad City Steamwheelers | Resch Center | |
| June 10 | 6:05 p.m. CT | Massachusetts Pirates | 49 | 28 | Vegas Knight Hawks | DCU Center | |
| June 10 | 7:05 p.m. CT | Sioux Falls Storm | 51 | 54 | Frisco Fighters | Denny Sanford Premier Center | |
| June 10 | 7:05 p.m. CT | Tulsa Oilers | 40 | 48 | Iowa Barnstormers | BOK Center | |
| June 10 | 8:05 p.m. CT | Tucson Sugar Skulls | 47 | 43 | Duke City Gladiators | Tucson Convention Center | |
| June 11 | 5:05 a.m. CT | San Diego Strike Force | 36 | 38 | Northern Arizona Wranglers | Pechanga Arena | |
| June 11 | 5:05 p.m. CT | Arizona Rattlers | 70 | 63 | Bay Area Panthers | Footprint Center | |

=== Week 14 ===
| Date | Time | Home team | Result | | Away team | Stadium | Ref |
|---|---|---|---|---|---|---|---|
| June 17 | 7:05 p.m. CT | Iowa Barnstormers | 80 | 41 | Quad City Steamwheelers | Wells Fargo Arena | |
| June 17 | 7:05 p.m. CT | Tulsa Oilers | 34 | 35 | Sioux Falls Storm | BOK Center | |
| June 17 | 7:05 p.m. CT | Duke City Gladiators | 34 | 57 | Arizona Rattlers | Rio Rancho Events Center | |
| June 17 | 8:05 p.m. CT | Northern Arizona Wranglers | 29 | 37 | Frisco Fighters | Findlay Toyota Center | |
| June 17 | 8:05 p.m. CT | Tucson Sugar Skulls | 54 | 59 | San Diego Strike Force | Tucson Convention Center | |
| June 17 | 9:05 p.m. CT | Vegas Knight Hawks | 41 | 56 | Bay Area Panthers | Dollar Loan Center | |

=== Week 15 ===
| Date | Time | Home team | Result | | Away team | Stadium | Ref |
|---|---|---|---|---|---|---|---|
| June 23 | 7:05 p.m. CT | Sioux Falls Storm | 47 | 45 | Green Bay Blizzard | Denny Sanford Premier Center | |
| June 24 | 6:05 p.m. CT | Massachusetts Pirates | 43 | 24 | Tulsa Oilers | DCU Center | |
| June 24 | 7:05 p.m. CT | Quad City Steamwheelers | 63 | 35 | Iowa Barnstormers | Vibrant Arena at The MARK | |
| June 24 | 7:05 p.m. CT | Duke City Gladiators | 53 | 30 | Vegas Knight Hawks | Rio Rancho Events Center | |
| June 24 | 7:05 p.m. CT | Frisco Fighters | 45 | 38 | Bay Area Panthers | Comerica Center | |
| June 24 | 8:05 p.m. CT | Northern Arizona Wranglers | 28 | 42 | Tucson Sugar Skulls | Findlay Toyota Center | |
| June 24 | 8:05 p.m. CT | Arizona Rattlers | 57 | 48 | San Diego Strike Force | Footprint Center | |

=== Week 16 ===
| Date | Time | Home team | Result | | Away team | Stadium | Ref |
|---|---|---|---|---|---|---|---|
| July 1 | 7:05 p.m. CT | Frisco Fighters | 56 | 15 | Sioux Falls Storm | Comerica Center | |
| July 1 | 7:05 p.m. CT | Tulsa Oilers | 55 | 58 | Green Bay Blizzard | BOK Center | |
| July 1 | 8:05 p.m. CT | Tucson Sugar Skulls | 34 | 40 | Vegas Knight Hawks | Tucson Convention Center | |
| July 2 | 5:05 p.m. CT | Arizona Rattlers | 52 | 43 | Massachusetts Pirates | Footprint Center | |

=== Week 17 ===
| Date | Time | Home team | Result | | Away team | Stadium | Ref |
|---|---|---|---|---|---|---|---|
| July 8 | 7:05 p.m. CT | Duke City Gladiators | 51 | 59 | Tucson Sugar Skulls | Rio Rancho Events Center | |
| July 8 | 7:05 p.m. CT | Iowa Barnstormers | 47 | 54 | Sioux Falls Storm | Wells Fargo Arena | |
| July 8 | 7:05 p.m. CT | Quad City Steamwheelers | 47 | 39 | Green Bay Blizzard | Vibrant Arena at The MARK | |
| July 8 | 10:05 p.m. CT | Northern Arizona Wranglers | 37 | 32 | Massachusetts Pirates | Findlay Toyota Center | |
| Jul 10 | 11:05 p.m. CT | Bay Area Panthers | 75 | 40 | San Diego Strike Force | SAP Center | |

=== Week 18 ===
| Date | Time | Home team | Result | | Away team | Stadium | Ref |
|---|---|---|---|---|---|---|---|
| July 15 | 7:05 p.m. CT | Duke City Gladiators | 35 | 44 | Bay Area Panthers | Rio Rancho Events Center | |
| July 15 | 7:05 p.m. CT | Iowa Barnstormers | 35 | 51 | Frisco Fighters | Wells Fargo Arena | |
| July 15 | 7:05 p.m. CT | Sioux Falls Storm | 62 | 59 | Massachusetts Pirates | Denny Sanford Premier Center | |
| July 15 | 7:05 p.m. CT | Tulsa Oilers | 56 | 35 | Quad City Steamwheelers | BOK Center | |
| July 15 | 8:05 p.m. CT | San Diego Strike Force | 58 | 42 | Vegas Knight Hawks | Pechanga Arena | |
| July 15 | 8:05 p.m. CT | Tucson Sugar Skulls | 48 | 39 | Green Bay Blizzard | Tucson Convention Center | |
| July 15 | 8:05 p.m. CT | Arizona Rattlers | 55 | 39 | Northern Arizona Wranglers | Footprint Center | |

=== Playoffs ===
First round (July 22–23)
W1 | Arizona Rattlers | 53
W4 | NAZ Wranglers | 62
W3 | Tucson Sugar Skulls | 34
W2 | Bay Area Panthers | 46
E1 | Frisco Fighters | 57
E4 | QC Steamwheelers | 29
E3 | Massachusetts Pirates | 39
E2 | Sioux Falls Storm | 42

Second round (July 29)
W4 | NAZ Wranglers | 46
W2 | Bay Area Panthers | 68
E1 | Frisco Fighters | 44
E2 | Sioux Falls Storm | 45

National Championship (August 5)
W2 | Bay Area Panthers | 51
E2 | Sioux Falls Storm | 41

== Awards ==
=== Players of the Week ===
| Week | Offensive Player of the Week | Defensive Player of the Week | Special Teams Player of the Week |
|---|---|---|---|
| 1 | T. J. Edwards QB (Frisco) | Kordell Jackson DB (Frisco) | Dillion Winfrey DB (Arizona) |
| 2 | Daquan Neal QB (Vegas) | Dexter Reese DB (Duke City) | Josh Gable K (Massachusetts) |
| 3 | Ramaud Bowman WR (Northern Arizona) | Kendricks Gladney Jr. DB (Quad City) | Ernesto Lacayo K (Duke City) |
| 4 | Isiah Scott WR (Arizona) | Jayson Serda LB (Duke City) | Carrington Thompson WR (Tucson) |
| 5 | Ryan Wisniewski WR (Northern Arizona) | Carlito Gonzales DB (Tucson) | Jerron McGaw RB (Quad City) |
| 6 | Joe Mancuso QB (Vegas) | Michael LoVett DB (Frisco) | Bryson Denley RB (Sioux Falls) |
| 7 | Jimmie Robinson RB (Massachusetts) | Seyvon Lowry DL (Arizona) | Imeek Watkins WR (Bay Area) |
| 8 | Dalton Sneed QB (Bay Area) | Michael LoVett DB (Frisco) | Chase Allbaugh K (Quad City) |
| 9 | Daquan Neal QB (Vegas) | Nazir Streater DB (Duke City) | Gabriel Rui K (Iowa) |
| 10 | Anthony Russo QB (Massachusetts) | Matt Elam DB (Vegas) | Jacob Moss WR (Northern Arizona) |
| 11 | T. J. Edwards QB (Frisco) | Cecil Cherry DL (Arizona) | Mike Green Jr. WR (Green Bay) |
| 12 | Drew Powell QB (Arizona) | Darin Hungerford LB (Bay Area) | Josh Gable K (Massachusetts) |
| 13 | Drew Powell QB (Arizona) | Melik Owens DL (Tucson) | Bryce Crawford K (Frisco) |
| 14 | Daniel Smith QB (Iowa) | Byron Edwards DB (Sioux Falls) | Gabriel Rui K (Iowa) |
| 15 | Drew Powell QB (Arizona) | Wesley Bowers LB (Bay Area) | Charles Headen III WR (Frisco) |
| 16 | Max Meylor QB (Green Bay) | Charles Williams DL (Frisco) | Harold Love DL (Arizona) |
| 17 | J. T. Stokes RB (Bay Area) | Trae Meadows DB (Bay Area) | Conor Mangan K (Northern Arizona) |
| 18 | Lorenzo Brown QB (Sioux Falls) | Jordan Jones LB (Tulsa) | Josh Crockett WR (Tulsa) |

=== Individual Awards ===
| Award | Winner | Position | Team | Ref |
|---|---|---|---|---|
| IFL Most Valuable Player | T. J Edwards | Quarterback | Frisco Fighters | |
| IFL Offensive Player of the Year | Drew Powell | Quarterback | Arizona Rattlers | |
| IFL Defensive Player of the Year | Tramond Lofton | Defensive end | Northern Arizona Wranglers | |
| IFL Special Teams Player of the Year | Charles Headen III | Kick returner | Frisco Fighters | |
| IFL Offensive Rookie of the Year | Jimmie Robinson | Running back | Massachusetts Pirates | |
| IFL Defensive Rookie of the Year | Kordell Jackson | Cornerback | Frisco Fighters | |
| IFL Head Coach of the Year | Hurtis Chinn | Head coach | Tucson Sugar Skulls | |
| IFL Assistant Coach of the Year | Rob Keefe | Defensive coordinator | Bay Area Panthers | |
| IFL Assistant Coach of the Year | Dixie Wooten | Offensive coordinator | Bay Area Panthers | |
| IFL Executive of the Year | Andy Scurto | Owner | Tulsa Oilers | |
| IFL Executive of the Year | Taylor Hall | General manager | Tulsa Oilers | |
| IFL John Pettit Person of the Year | Kathy Treankler | Owner | Green Bay Blizzard | |

=== Team Awards ===
| Award | Team | Ref |
|---|---|---|
| IFL Franchise of the Year | Green Bay Blizzard | |
| IFL Fan Base Champions | Arizona Rattlers | |
| IFL Best Game Operations | Arizona Rattlers | |
| IFL Best Cheer/Dance Team | Arizona Rattlers | |
| IFL Best Community Relations | Green Bay Blizzard | |
| IFL Best Hospitality | Vegas Knight Hawks | |
| IFL Best Social Media | Quad City Steamwheelers | |
| IFL Best Mascot | Northern Arizona Wranglers | |
| IFL Best Game Day Broadcast | Arizona Rattlers | |

=== All-IFL Teams ===
The teams are split into three groups: the first team, the second team, and the rookie team. Representatives from each IFL team voted on the league's best players. The Frisco Fighters had the most selections with 11.Refs

==== Offense ====
| Position | First Team | Second Team | Rookie Team |
|---|---|---|---|
| Quarterback | T. J. Edwards, FRI | Drew Powell, Arizona | Anthony Russo, Massachusetts |
| Running back | Jimmie Robinson, Massachusetts | Justin Rankin, Bay Area | Jimmie Robinson, Massachusetts |
| Wide receiver | Kentrez Bell, San Diego | Ramaud Chiaokhiao-Bowman, Northern Arizona | Nih-Jer Jackson, Bay Area |
| Wide receiver | Carrington Thompson, Tucson | J. T. Stokes, Bay Area | Ryan Wisniewski, Northern Arizona |
| Wide receiver | Issac Zico, Massachusetts | Marquise Irvin, Green Bay | Phazione McClurge, Frisco |
| Center | Cole Carter, Arizona | Lawrence Martin IV, Sioux Falls | Hunter Kelly, Massachusetts |
| Offensive lineman | Wilson Bell, Massachusetts | Lamar Mady, Arizona | Navaughn Donaldson, Massachusetts |
| Offensive lineman | Darius James, Frisco | Amari Catchings, Bay Area | Amari Catchings, Bay Area |

==== Defense ====
| Position | First Team | Second Team | Rookie Team |
|---|---|---|---|
| Defensive lineman | Chris Terrell, Arizona | Maurice Jackson, Tucson | Tevaughn Grant, Bay Area |
| Defensive lineman | Charles Williams, Frisco | Tevaughn Grant, Bay Area | Melik Owens, Tucson |
| Defensive lineman | Tramond Lofton, Northern Arizona | Jaylin Swan, Quad City | Anthony Hayes, Green Bay |
| Linebacker | Jordan Jones, Tulsa | James Brown, Sioux Falls | Jordan Jones, Tulsa |
| Linebacker / Defensive back | Davontae Merriweather, Arizona | Shaq Bond, Frisco | Antwon Kincade, Bay Area |
| Defensive back | Kordell Jackson, Frisco | Eugene Ford, Sioux Falls | Eugene Ford, Sioux Falls |
| Defensive back | Darreon Jackson, Quad City | Michael Lovett, Frisco | Kordell Jackson, Frisco |
| Defensive back | Dillion Winfrey, Arizona | Roderick Chapman, Duke City | Kishawn Walker, Northern Arizona |

==== Special Teams ====
| Position | First Team | Second Team | Rookie Team |
|---|---|---|---|
| Kicker | Bryce Crawford, Frisco | Gabriel Rui, Iowa | Conor Mangan, Northern Arizona |
| Kick returner | Charles Headen III, Frisco | Jimmie Robinson, Massachusetts | Charles Headen III, Frisco |

==== Number of selections per team ====
| Team | Selections |
|---|---|
| Frisco Fighters | 11 |
| Bay Area Panthers | 8 |
| Massachusetts Pirates | 8 |
| Arizona Rattlers | 6 |
| Northern Arizona Wranglers | 5 |
| Sioux Falls Storm | 4 |
| Tucson Sugar Skulls | 3 |
| Green Bay Blizzard | 2 |
| Tulsa Oilers | 2 |
| Quad City Steamwheelers | 2 |
| San Diego Strike Force | 1 |
| Duke City Gladiators | 1 |
| Iowa Barnstormers | 1 |

== See also ==
- 2023 National Arena League season
