= 2018 Champions Indoor Football season =

Season in the Champions Indoor Football League

- League: Champions Indoor Football
- Sport: Indoor football
- Duration: March 3 – June 10

Regular season
- Season champions: Duke City Gladiators
- Season MVP: Darrian Miller (Sioux City)

Playoffs
- North Conference champions: Sioux City Bandits
- North Conference runners-up: Salina Liberty
- South Conference champions: Duke City Gladiators
- South Conference runners-up: Texas Revolution

Champions Bowl IV
- Champions: Duke City Gladiators
- Runners-up: Sioux City Bandits

Champions Indoor Football seasons
- ← 2017 2019 →

The 2018 Champions Indoor Football season was the fourth season of the CIF. The regular season began on March 3, when the Wichita Force traveled to Salina Liberty, losing 17–15. The regular season concluded on June 10. This was the second season in which four teams per conference advanced to the Champions Bowl playoffs, with the top seed in each conference hosting their conference's fourth seed, and second seeds hosting third seeds in the first round.

The league champion was the Duke City Gladiators over the Sioux City Bandits 31–27 in Champions Bowl IV. The regular season MVP was Sioux City Bandits running back Darrian Miller.

== League changes ==
On August 16, 2017, the CIF announced the Quad City Steamwheelers as an expansion team for 2018. On August 30, the league announced the addition of the Sioux Falls Storm from the Indoor Football League (IFL). The Wichita Falls Nighthawks of the IFL also joined on September 12.

On the same day the Nighthawks joined, the Bloomington Edge and West Michigan Ironmen left the CIF for the IFL. The CIF apparently then attempted to sue the IFL, Edge, and Ironmen for leaving the CIF after the two teams had already signed league affiliation agreements with the CIF for 2018. The IFL then threatened to sue the CIF, Storm, and Nighthawks in return despite neither former IFL team signing an affiliation agreement with the IFL for 2018. To avoid disputes, the CIF stated they would not schedule either team. The Storm immediately announced that they would return to the IFL and the Nighthawks had to suspend operations.

While the CIF did drop the lawsuit against the IFL, it filed for an injunction against the Edge and Ironmen teams from participating in the IFL for breaking the terms of their signed affiliation agreements. A temporary injunction from participation against the two teams was granted on January 31, 2018. The Ironmen later announced a change in ownership,. were granted approval to return to the CIF for the 2019 season and were allowed to play the 2018 season in the semi-professional Midwest Professional Indoor Football (MPIF) during the 2018 season. The Edge then played an independent schedule after the conclusion of the 2018 CIF season to meet the terms of the injunction.

Prior to the season, Dallas Marshals were sold and moved to the Fair Park Coliseum due to arena lease issues in negotiations with the new Mesquite Arena owners. The Marshals played two regular season home games on March 3 and 10, however, they canceled their next two for March 24 and April 14 on the day of the games. After the April 14 postponed game, the CIF issued a statement that a decision concerning the team is pending. The Marshals played an away game at the Texas Revolution on April 21, and the Fair Park Coliseum listed all remaining Marshals' games as postponed. On April 27, the team suspended operations for the rest of the season.

== Standings ==
North Conference
Team	W	L	PCT	PF	PA
x–Salina Liberty	9	3	.714	347	288
y–Sioux City Bandits	9	3	.733	515	330
y–Quad City Steamwheelers	8	4	.667	398	335
y–Bismarck Bucks	5	7	.417	460	446
Omaha Beef	4	8	.333	526	617
Kansas City Phantoms	3	9	.250	497	723
South Conference
Team	W	L	PCT	PF	PA
z–Duke City Gladiators	10	2	.833	504	339
y-Amarillo Venom	8	4	.667	507	394
y-Texas Revolution	5	7	.417	272	299
y-Wichita Force	4	8	.333	216	258
Dallas Marshals (Note: After the several canceled home games, the Marshals ceased operations on April 27. Their remaining games were given as forfeits.)	1	5	.167	176	331

z - clinched top overall seed
x - clinched conference title
y - clinched playoff berth

== Playoffs ==
Conference Semi-final
N3	Quad Cities	46
N2	Sioux City	54
North Conference
N4	Bismarck	51
N1	Salina	81
S3	Texas	56
S2	Amarillo	45
South Conference
S4	Wichita	39
S1	Duke City	44

Conference championship
N2	Sioux City	45
N1	Salina	39
S3	Texas	28
S1	Duke City	41

Champions Bowl IV
N2	Sioux City	27
S1	Duke City	31
