= 2017 Champions Indoor Football season =

- League: Champions Indoor Football
- Sport: Indoor football
- Duration: February 25 – June 3

Regular season
- Season champions: Amarillo Venom
- Season MVP: Donovan Porterie (Duke City Gladiators)

Playoffs
- North Conference champions: Omaha Beef
- North Conference runners-up: Sioux City Bandits
- South Conference champions: Texas Revolution
- South Conference runners-up: Amarillo Venom

Champions Bowl III
- Champions: Texas Revolution
- Runners-up: Omaha Beef
- Finals MVP: Clinton Solomon (TEX)

Champions Indoor Football seasons
- ← 2016 2018 →

The 2017 Champions Indoor Football season was the third season of the CIF. It started on February 25, when the Omaha Beef traveled to Iowa, losing to the Sioux City Bandits 63–44. The regular season concluded on Saturday, June 3. This was the first season in which four teams per conference advanced to the Champions Bowl playoffs, with the top seed in each conference hosting their conference's fourth seed, and second seeds hosting third seeds in the first round.

The league champion was the Texas Revolution, who defeated the Beef 59–49 in Champions Bowl III. The season MVP was Duke City Gladiators quarterback Donovan Porterie, and the Champions Bowl MVP was Revolution wide receiver Clinton Solomon.

== League changes ==
New Teams	Bismarck Bucks, CenTex Cavalry, Kansas City Phantoms, River City Raiders, West Michigan Ironmen
Renamed / Relocated Teams	Mesquite Marshals → Dallas Marshals
Defunct / Departed Teams	Chicago Eagles, River City Raiders, San Angelo Bandits
Total Teams	14

== Standings ==
North Conference
	W	L	PCT	PF	PA
x–Sioux City Bandits	9	3	.750	704	599
y–Omaha Beef	7	5	.583	561	562
y–Bloomington Edge	7	5	.583	598	560
y–Bismarck Bucks	5	7	.417	540	569
Kansas City Phantoms	4	8	.333	499	594
West Michigan Ironmen	4	8	.333	569	570
Salina Liberty	1	11	.083	403	546
South Conference
	W	L	PCT	PF	PA
z–Amarillo Venom	9	3	.750	758	639
y-Texas Revolution	8	4	.667	716	584
y-Dodge City Law (Note: On June 2, the CIF penalized Dodge City by removing two of their wins when the team was 9–2, reducing their record to 7–4.)	7	5	.583	631	575
y-Duke City Gladiators	7	5	.583	663	513
Wichita Force	7	5	.583	567	481
Dallas Marshals	7	5	.583	500	512
CenTex Cavalry	0	12	.000	412	811

z - clinched top overall seed

x - clinched division title

y - clinched playoff berth

=== Dodge City Law video controversy ===
On June 2, 2017, the league stripped the Dodge City Law of two victories without awarding them to any other team. Reports from other teams and a subsequent investigation found that the Law were in violation of the league's operations manual and guidelines on uploading video. As their final game of the season did not start at the time, the Law's record went from 9–2 to 7–4. When asked about the decision, commissioner Ricky Bertz stated, "While this situation was unfortunate and no one in the CIF including the Dodge City Law wanted this to be the final outcome, the board of directors decided that this was what was best for the league given the circumstances and how they related to all team members involved."

== Playoffs ==
Conference Semi-Finals
3	Bloomington	30
2	Omaha	43
North Conference
4	Bismarck	43
1	Sioux City	82
3	Dodge City	59
2	Texas	63
South Conference
4	Duke City	41
1	Amarillo	70

Conference Championships
2	Omaha	55
1	Sioux City	45
2	Texas	77
1	Amarillo	71

Champions Bowl III
N2	Omaha	49
S2	Texas	59

== Awards ==
=== Players of the week ===
The following were named the top performers during the 2017 season:

Week	Offensive Player of the Week	Defensive Player of the Week	Special Teams Player of the Week
1	Calvin Phillips (Beef)	Devon Bridges (Bandits)	Dominique Carson (Bandits)
2	Frederick Bruno (Bandits)	Michael McGee (Edge)	Chad Marrow (Marshals)
3	J. J. Hayes (Edge)	Kiaree Daniels (Force)	Drew O'Brien (Liberty)
4	David Olson (Phantoms)	Gary Henderson (Law)	Brian Weeks (Gladiators)
5	Donovan Porterie (Gladiators)	Cliff Stokes (Bandits)	Jared Wood (Law)
6	Alex Carder (Ironmen)	LaDon Hudson (Revolution)	Greg Conry (Bandits)
7	Chris Dixon (Revolution)	Darien Anderson (Force)	Mitch Moore (Edge)
8	Nate Davis (Venom)	Devon Bridges (Bandits)	Jared Wood (Law)
9	Stephen Alfred (Marshals)	Donte Hurst (Ironmen)	Jacob Felton (Venom)
10	Michael Dyer (Revolution)	Brandon Jenkins (Phantoms)	Benny Hanaphy (Beef)
11	Jake Medlock (Force)	Ricky Wyatt (Law)	Evan Connolly (Bucks)
12	Clinton Solomon (Revolution)	Ben Pister (Phantoms)	Dallas Herndon (Phantoms)
13	Donovan Porterie (Gladiators)	Keenen Gibbs (Force)	Greg Conry (Bandits)
14	Jonathan Ray (Beef)	Brenden Daley (Bucks)	Antonio Bray (Gladiators)
15	Darrelynn Dunn (Edge)	Ben Pister (Phantoms)	Cody Barber (Edge)

=== Individual season awards ===
Award	Winner	Position	Team
Most Valuable Player	Donovan Porterie	Quarterback	Duke City Gladiators
Offensive Player of the Year	Clinton Solomon	Wide receiver	Texas Revolution
Defensive Player of the Year	Devon Bridges	Defensive lineman	Sioux City Bandits
Special Teams Player of the Year	Jacob Felton	Kicker	Amarillo Venom
Rookie of the Year	Michael Dyer	Running back	Texas Revolution
Coach of the Year	Erv Strohbeen	Head coach	Sioux City Bandits

=== All-CIF Team ===
Offense
Quarterback	Donovan Porterie, Duke City
Running back	Kory Ringer, West Michigan
Wide receiver	Daniel McKinney, Dodge City; Clinton Solomon, Texas; J. J. Hayes, Bloomington
Offensive guard	Darren Marquez, Wichita; Kamalie Matthews, Dodge City
Center	Matt Rahn, Sioux City

Defense
Defensive end	Devon Bridges, Sioux City; Gary Henderson, Dodge City
Defensive tackle	Tyrone Ezell, Bismarck
Linebacker	Ricky Wyatt, Dodge City
Defensive back	DeWayne Autrey, Sioux City; Kendrick Harper, Wichita; Isiah Barfield, Salina; Juvi-Ray Berry, Duke City

Special teams
Kicker	Jacob Felton, Amarillo
Kick returner	Michael Dyer, Texas

=== All-Conference Teams ===
==== First Team Northern ====
Offense
Quarterback	Alex Carder, West Michigan
Running back	Kory Ringer, West Michigan
Wide receiver	Anthony Parks, Kansas City; J. J. Hayes, Bloomington; Fredrick Bruno, Sioux City
Offensive guard	Arthur Doakes, Sioux City; Darius Barnes, Sioux City
Center	Matt Rahn, Sioux City

Defense
Defensive end	Devon Bridges, Sioux City; Brenden Daley, Bismarck
Defensive tackle	Tyrone Ezell, Bismarck
Linebacker	Jarelle Miller, Bismarck
Defensive back	DeWayne Autrey, Sioux City; Isiah Barfield, Salina; Cliff Stokes, Sioux City; Paul Robinson, Omaha

Special teams
Kicker	Greg Conroy, Sioux City
Kick returner	Dominique Carson, Sioux City

==== Second Team Northern ====
Offense
Quarterback	Anthony Iannotti, Omaha
Running back	Dominique Carson, Sioux City
Wide receiver	Marcus Lewis, Bloomington; Jeremiah Oates, Sioux City; Elby Pope, Bismarck
Offensive guard	Anthony Bullock, West Michigan; Dion Paulson, Bismarck
Center	Connor Hart, Bloomington

Defense
Defensive end	Ben Pister, Kansas City; Rony Nelson, West Michigan
Defensive tackle	Anthony Ficklin, Omaha
Linebacker	Brock Long, Salina
Defensive back	Stephen Franklin, Kansas City; Brandon Clarke, Bloomington; Deonte Hurst, Wes Michigan; Chris Perry, Omaha

Special teams
Kicker	Cody Barber, Bloomington
Kick returner	O. J. Simpson, Kansas City

==== First Team Southern ====
Offense
Quarterback	Nate Davis, Amarillo
Running back	Michael Dyer, Texas
Wide receiver	Daniel McKinney, Dodge City; Clinton Solomon, Texas; Bret Soft, Wichita
Offensive guard	Darren Marquez, Wichita; Kamalie Matthews, Dodge City
Center	Cameron Edwards, Amarillo

Defense
Defensive end	Fatu Ulale, Duke City; Gary Henderson, Dodge City
Defensive tackle	Brandon Harold, Texas
Linebacker	Ricky Wyatt, Dodge City
Defensive back	Frankie Solomon Jr., Texas; Kendrick Harper, Wichita; Joe Powell, Dallas; Juvi-Ray Berry, Duke City

Special teams
Kicker	Jacob Felton, Amarillo
Kick returner	Michael Dyer, Texas

==== Second Team Southern ====
Offense
Quarterback	Donovan Porterie, Duke City
Running back	Antonio Bray, Duke City
Wide receiver	Larry Cobb, Duke City; Stacy Martin, Dallas; Cedric Gilbert, Amarillo
Offensive guard	Chris Brown, Dallas; Robert Griffin, Texas
Center	Terry Banks Jr., Amarillo

Defense
Defensive end	Kennen Gibbs, Wichita; Samual Wren, Dallas
Defensive tackle	Jamar Seard, Dodge City
Linebacker	Jason Serda, Duke City
Defensive back	Tyrell Green, Dodge City; Donnie Duncan, Amarillo; Ray Little, Duke City; Anthony Webb, Dallas

Special teams
Kicker	Jared Wood, Dodge City
Kick returner	Antonio Bray, Duke City
