= Unity Christian High School (Fulton) =

Unity Christian Schools

Location
- 1000 19th Ave NW; Clinton, Iowa 52732; United States; 41.86553°N 90.20864°W

Information
- School type: Private
- Religious affiliation: Reformed
- Founded: August 24, 1981
- Superintendent: Jessica Hollewell
- Grades: K-12
- Gender: Coed
- Hours in school day: 7
- Colours: Blue & Gray
- Nickname: Knights
- Accreditation: CSI, ICNS, NCA
- Website: https://www.unitychristian.com

Unity Christian High School is a private high school located in Clinton, Iowa, USA. It educates around 147 students in grades 7-12. The school was established on August 24, 1981 with the first students graduating on May 24, 1985.

== Academics ==
Unity has recently begun revising its curriculum to better integrate Biblical Truths in the classroom.

== Other activities ==
Unity currently offers Boys Soccer, Girls Volleyball, Boys Basketball, Girls Basketball, Boys Baseball, Girls Softball, Boys Track, Girls Track, and Quiz Bowl.

Unity also has a Praise band filled with past and present students. Some of the highlights of the Unity school year include the opening retreat at Rock River Camp and Spirit Week (climaxing with the Ski Trip).

== Name ==
In 1921, Fulton Excelsior Christian School came into existence, meeting in the basement of First Christian Reformed Church in Fulton, Illinois. In 1953, with a new building on the way on 10th Street in Fulton, the name was changed to Community Christian School. Unity Christian High School was created August 24, 1981 and combined with the elementary in 1992 to form Unity Christian Schools.

== Growth ==
Over the past three years, Unity began an aggressive campaign to increase student enrollment using primarily Open Houses, Radio Ads, and word of mouth. While student numbers have soared, Unity has also made many improvements to the building including: a Media Center filled with brand new computers, Smartboards in most of the classrooms, a new spacious Art room, and an Academic Support Center.

To help support these improvements, the school board formed a team to research and create a thrift store. This team's work eventually led to the formation of Bargain Bonanza, a non-profit organization that passes its earnings on to Unity Christian Schools.

Unity Christian relocated to a newly built facility in Clinton, Iowa in 2026.
