= Dakota Bucks =

Indoor American Football team

Logo

General information
- Founded: 2016
- Headquartered: Bismarck Event Center in Bismarck, North Dakota
- Colors: Orange, dark blue, black and gold
- Mascot: TAG
- DakotaBucks.com

Personnel
- Owner: BEK Communications
- General manager: Gregory Schuh
- Head coach: Rod Miller

Team history
- Bismarck Bucks (2017–2022)

Home fields
- Bismarck Event Center (2017–2022)

League / conference affiliations
- Champions Indoor Football (2017–2018); North Conference (2017–2018); Indoor Football League (2019–2022); Eastern Conference (2022)

Playoff appearances (3)
- 2017, 2018, 2021

The Bismarck Bucks were an indoor American football team based in Bismarck, North Dakota. The Bucks joined Champions Indoor Football (CIF) as an expansion team in 2016, and began play for the 2017 season. The team moved to the Indoor Football League (IFL) beginning with the 2019 season. The team played its home games at the Bismarck Event Center in Bismarck. The team suspended operations in 2022; the team's owners indicated it would attempt to return in 2025 under a new brand, the Dakota Bucks, once the regulatory issues that prevented the team from playing in 2023 were resolved. The issues, as of November 2024, remain unresolved, and the IFL left the team off its subsequent schedules.

The Bucks were the third indoor football team to play in Bismarck, following the Bismarck Blaze who played in the original Indoor Football League for its second and final season of 2000, as well as the Bismarck Roughriders who played in the National Indoor Football League from 2002 until 2003.

== History ==
=== 2017–2022 ===
On September 28, 2016, it was announced that Bismarck had been granted a team in the CIF to begin play for the 2017 season and owned by the Sallberg family under the corporate name Dakota Pro Football LLC. Richard Davis was announced as the team's first head coach and general manager, with former University of Mary wide receiver Elby Pope signed as the team's first player.

Following a name-the-team contest, the Bismarck Bucks name, logo and colors were announced on the November 1 episode of KXMB-TV news/talk program Good Day Dakota.

During the Bucks' second season, head coach and general manager Richard Davis was relieved of duties after several workplace grievances had been filed against him and his wife Judy Davis, another Bucks' employee. He was replaced by former Wichita Force and Bucks' offensive coordinator Paco Martinez on an interim basis.

On October 5, 2018, the Bucks announced that they had joined the Indoor Football League for the 2019 season, following the Quad City Steamwheelers from the CIF. At the beginning of the 2019 season, the majority ownership of Dakota Pro Football LLC was sold to BEK Communications by the Sallberg family.

=== 2023 ===
The Bucks were inactive for the 2023 season in the IFL. The team will be collaborating with the North Dakota Workforce Safety Insurance (WSI) to determine the scope of services needed to support the franchise. The team proposed a relocation to Fargo, planning to play its games in Scheels Arena there, with one game at Rough Rider Center in Watford City; to this effect, the team hosted a "Fargo IFL Gridiron Classic" between the Sioux Falls Storm and Massachusetts Pirates on April 27. To accommodate the change, the team announced a name change to the "Dakota Bucks." The Bucks looked to compete in the 2025 season; this did not come to pass, and on October 31, 2024, the IFL released its 2025 schedule, which did not include the Bucks.

== Season-by-season results ==
League champions	Conference champions	Division champions	Playoff berth	League leader

Season	League	Conference	Division	Regular season				Postseason results
Season	League	Conference	Division	Finish	Wins	Losses	Ties	Postseason results
2017	CIF	North		4th	5	7	0	Lost Conference Semifinal (Sioux City) 43–82
2018	CIF	North		4th	5	7	0	Lost Conference Semifinal (Salina) 51–81
2019	IFL			8th	2	12	0	
2020	IFL			—	0	1	0	Season cancelled due to COVID-19 pandemic
2021	IFL			7th	7	8	0	Lost First round (Massachusetts) 19–44
2022	IFL	Eastern		6th	3	13	0	
2023	IFL	Dormant year						
2024	IFL	Dormant year						
Totals					22	48	0	All-time regular season record (2017–2022)
Totals					0	3	—	All-time postseason record (2017–2022)
Totals					22	51	0	All-time regular season and postseason record (2017–2022)

Previous logo of the team when it was called Bismarck Bucks
