= Kansas City Phantoms =

Logo

General information
- Founded: 2016
- Headquartered: Silverstein Eye Centers Arena in Independence, Missouri
- Colors: Navy, gold, azure, white
- www.kcphantoms.com

Personnel
- Owners: Dr. Ken Vehec; Antonio Hori
- CEO: Antonio Hori
- General manager: Meadow Lemon
- Head coach: Meadow Lemon

Team history
- Kansas City Phantoms (2017–2018)

Home fields
- Silverstein Eye Centers Arena (2017–2018)

League / conference affiliations
- Champions Indoor Football (2017–2018): North Conference (2017–2018)

The Kansas City Phantoms were a professional indoor American football team based in Independence, Missouri. The Phantoms competed in Champions Indoor Football (CIF) as a member of the league's North Conference. The team was founded in 2016 by Dr. Ken Vehec and Antonio Hori. The Phantoms joined the CIF as an expansion team in 2017. The Phantoms played their home games at the Silverstein Eye Centers Arena for both seasons.

== History ==
On October 17, 2016, the Phantoms were announced as an expansion member of Champions Indoor Football. On October 26, 2016, former indoor football quarterback, Chris Coffin was named the head coach of the Phantoms. The Phantoms finished their first season 4–8. On August 10, 2017, the Phantoms announced that Coffin would not return as the head coach.

For the 2018 season, the Phantoms hired Meadow Lemon as head coach. The team finished 3–9 and again failed to make the playoffs. The team was not listed as a member of the CIF when the 2019 schedule was released.

== Statistics ==
=== Season-by-season results ===
As of the 2018 season:

| League champions | Conference champions | Division champions | Playoff berth | League leader |

| Season | League | Conference | Division | Regular season | | | | Postseason results |
| Season | League | Conference | Division | Finish | Wins | Losses | Ties | Postseason results |
|---|---|---|---|---|---|---|---|---|
| 2017 | CIF | North | | 6th | 4 | 8 | — | |
| 2018 | CIF | North | | 6th | 3 | 9 | — | |
| Totals | | | | | 7 | 17 | 0 | All-time regular season record (2017–2018) |
| Totals | | | | | 0 | 0 | — | All-time postseason record (2017–2018) |
| Totals | | | | | 7 | 17 | 0 | All-time regular season and postseason record (2017–2018) |

=== Head coaches' records ===
As of the 2018 CIF season:

| Name | Term | Regular season | | | | Playoffs | | Awards |
| Name | Term | W | L | T | Win% | W | L | Awards |
|---|---|---|---|---|---|---|---|---|
| Chris Coffin | 2017 | 4 | 8 | 0 | .333 | 0 | 0 | |
| Meadow Lemon | 2018 | 3 | 9 | 0 | .250 | 0 | 0 | |

== Notable players ==
See Category:Kansas City Phantoms players
