= Tucson Convention Center =

Convention center in Arizona

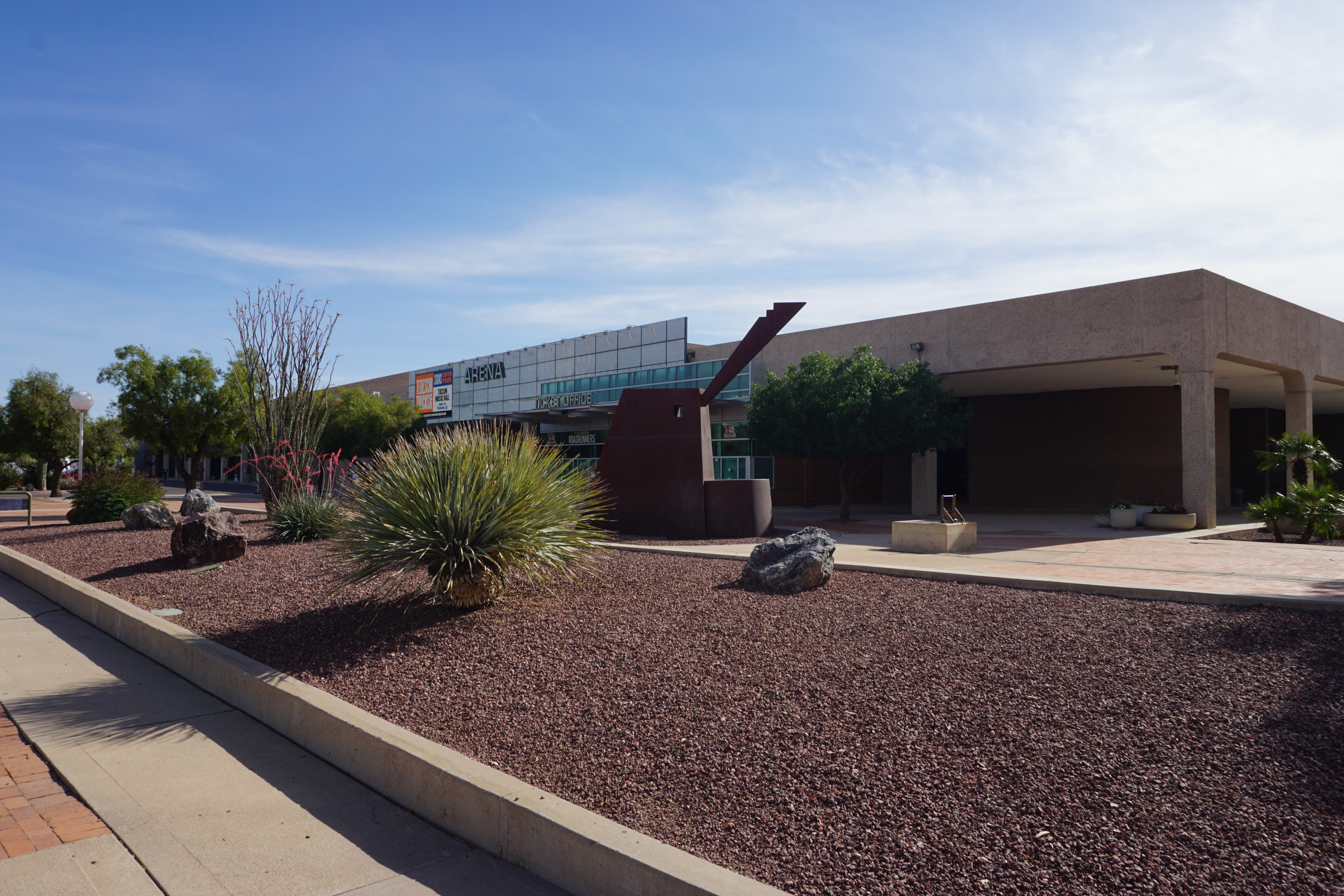
- Tucson Arena at the Tucson Convention Center

- Location within Arizona Location within the United States
- Former names: Tucson Community Center (1971-2002)
- Address: 260 S Church Ave
- Location: Downtown Tucson
- Coordinates: 32°13′6″N 110°58′27″W
- Operator: ASM Global
- Public transit: Tucson Sun Link at Granada/Cushing

Construction
- Built: 1971
- Renovated: 1987, 2014
- Expanded: 1988

Tenants
- Tucson Rustlers (PHL) (1978–1979); Arizona Wildcats (ACHA) (1980–present); Tucson Gila Monsters (WCHL) (1997–1998); Tucson Roadrunners (AHL) (2016–present); Tucson Sugar Skulls (IFL) (2019–present)

The Tucson Convention Center (previously named the Tucson Community Center) is a multi-purpose convention center located in downtown Tucson, Arizona. Built in 1971, the location includes an 8,962-seat indoor arena, two performing arts venues, and 205,000 square feet (19,000 m^{2}) of meeting space. The complex was listed on the National Register of Historic Places in 2015.

== Performance venues ==
- The Linda Ronstadt Music Hall, with 2,289 seats, is used for concert performances, including opera. Known originally as the Tucson Music Hall, it was renamed in honor of Tucson native Linda Ronstadt in 2022.
- Leo Rich Theater, with 511 seats, is used for small scale and more intimate performances.
- Tucson Arena, with maximum capacity of 8,962. In the 200 seating series, total capacity is 4,988, 100 series total capacity is 2,724 and the floor capacity is 1,250. Standard hockey capacity is 6,521.

=== Tucson Roadrunners ===
Beginning from the fall of 2016, Tucson Arena has been home to the Tucson Roadrunners in the American Hockey League.

=== University of Arizona hockey ===
The University of Arizona Wildcats club hockey team currently plays at Tucson Arena. Although associated with the college, the team receives no funding directly from the school. The hockey team is a Division 1 member of the American Collegiate Hockey Association. Leo Golembiewski had been the head coach for 27 years, leading the team to 21 straight national tournaments, with eight semi-final appearances and one national championship. The current coach is Chad Berman.

=== Tucson Sugar Skulls ===
On August 23, 2018, the Indoor Football League announced the addition of the expansion Tucson Sugar Skulls to begin play in 2019.

=== Other events ===
The Tucson Convention Center has been host to many other events including the Tucson Gem & Mineral Show, Jehovah's Witnesses Regional Conventions, the Ringling Brothers and Barnum and Bailey Circus, concerts, monster truck shows as well as many live WWE television broadcasts featuring Raw, SmackDown & ECW. In 1999, the arena hosted an Empty Arena match between The Rock and Mankind for the WWF Championship, which aired during halftime of Super Bowl XXXIII.

While McKale Center was being built at the University of Arizona, the Wildcats briefly considered playing some of its 1971-72 men's basketball games at Tucson Arena, but eventually decided against doing so, opting to remain in Bear Down Gymnasium until McKale Center was ready.

The arena also hosted concerts by Elvis Presley on November 9, 1972 and June 1, 1976. He previous had performed at the Tucson Rodeo Grounds on June 10, 1956.

During the 2016 presidential race Donald Trump spoke in front of approximately 5000 people, for which his campaign still owes over $80,000 for local police and other services.

Ventriloquist and comedian Jeff Dunham hosted a show at the arena as part of his "Seriously!?" tour on October 3, 2021.

=== Renovation ===
Throughout 2014, the Tucson Convention Center was renovated at a cost of $22 million, via funding by the Rio Nuevo downtown redevelopment and revitalization district and the City of Tucson, including new bathrooms, lighting, seats, a revamped sound system, a new kitchen and a video scoreboard. Mike Love's Beach Boys headlined a January 4, 2015 concert at the venue, debuting the remodeled arena.

Management of the convention center is now handled by ASM Global.

== See also ==
- List of convention centers in the United States
- National Register of Historic Places listings in Pima County, Arizona
