= Arizona Wildcats men's ice hockey =

Arizona Wildcats
- Founded: 1979
- History: IceCats; 1979–2011 (ACHA 1991-2011); Arizona Wildcats; 2011–present (ACHA)
- Home arena: Tucson Convention Center
- City: Tucson, Arizona
- Team colors: Cardinal Red, Navy Blue & White
- Media: FastHockey.com
- Head coach: Chad Berman
- Captain: Dylan Carter
- Official website: www.arizonawildcathockey.org

The Arizona Wildcats men's ice hockey team is a college ice hockey program that represents the University of Arizona. The team competes in the American Collegiate Hockey Association Division I level as a WCHL (Western Collegiate Hockey League) team.

== Club ice hockey (pre-1979) ==
Intercollegiate ice hockey at the University of Arizona got its start in the late 1970s as a traditional student-run sports club, open to all interested students. The team did not have a coach, schedule, or much organization, but they did receive support from the Tucson Rustlers (a local professional ice hockey team at the time) and played teams from Phoenix, Flagstaff, and Los Angeles. The earliest known record of Arizona's ice hockey club team is a photo and short write-up in the 1978–79 University of Arizona school yearbook.

== Arizona IceCats (1979–2011) ==
Leo Golembiewski became head coach and general manager of the team. Under Golembiewski, the team became known as the Arizona IceCats and were a founding member of the American Collegiate Hockey Association (ACHA, est. 1991).

Golembiewski coached the team for 32 seasons of play, ending with the 2010–2011 season, and had an overall record of 634–217–23. They won a national championship (1985), appeared in eight Final Fours (’84, ’86, ’87, ’88, ’91, ’93, ’94, ’97) and ten Elite Eights.

Starting in the 1980–81 season, IceCat home games were played at the Tucson Convention Center.

IceCats games were also broadcast on ESPN radio and the World Wide Web on FastHockey.com.

== Arizona Wildcats (2011–present) ==
In April 2011, the University of Arizona took over the administration of the program. Along with affiliation with the Department of Campus Recreation, the move included a name change from IceCats to Wildcats, managerial changes throughout the organization, and coaching staff changes. Assistant Coach and former player Dave Dougall remained with the team through the transition. Two staff members stayed with the team as well, Official scorer Hank Krzysik and On Ice Announcer Joe Pyritz.

The Arizona Wildcat hockey team continues to play their home games at Tucson Convention Center. Games are still broadcast online, with streams available on the Wildcat Hockey website.

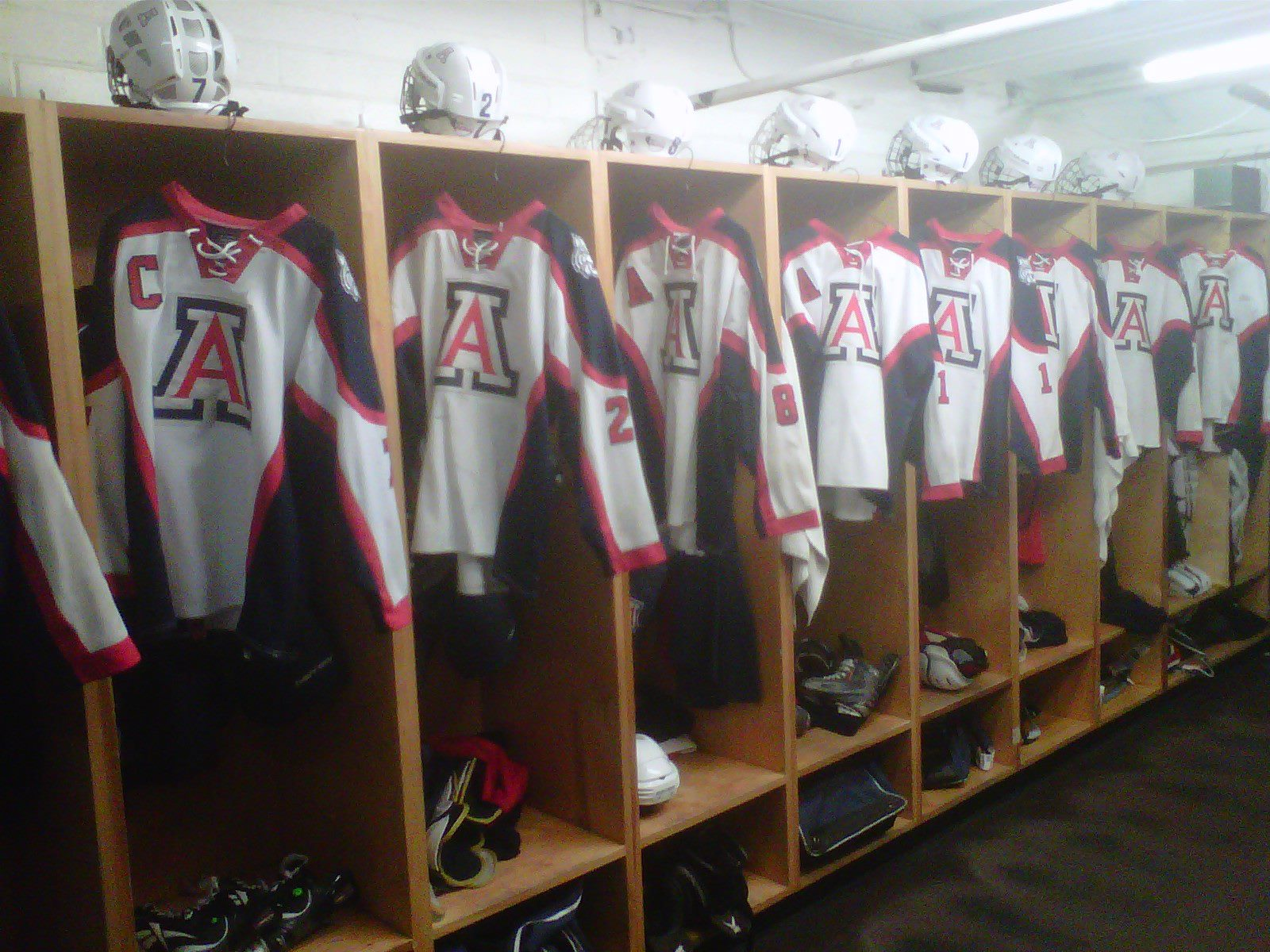
The Wildcats, with official school support, now wear the "Block A."

In the first season under their new name, the Wildcats went 13–18–3 over the course of 34 games. Wins against ranked opponents Oklahoma and Ohio highlighted the year, while the Wildcats struggled against in-state rival ASU. Sophomore Andrew Murmes led the team in scoring. The Wildcats finished the season 25th in the final ACHA Division I rankings.

=== Team statistics ===
Season	W	L	T	OTL	SOL	GF	GA
2011-12	13	18	1	1	1	142	111

(W= Wins, L= Losses, T= Ties, OTL= Overtime Losses, SOL= Shootout Losses, GF= Goals For, GA= Goals Against)

=== Community involvement ===
Since becoming affiliated with the University of Arizona, the current Arizona Wildcats are expected by head coach to participate in community events and volunteer their time to the city of Tucson. This new emphasis on community involvement includes players volunteering at the Tucson Festival of Hearts, visiting elementary schools where the players read to the classes and answer students' questions about hockey, and participating in team signing fundraisers to raise hockey awareness in Tucson.

According to Coach, the team's community involvement is not only important because it promotes hockey and gets more people excited about a sport that is not typical of the desert, but also because it allows the players to grow as people and have a well-rounded college experience. The expectations for the Arizona Wildcats are much higher than those which the Arizona IceCats were held to; now the team is expected to perform well on the ice and off, as players both in the rink and in the university and Tucson community.

=== Partnership with the Wildcat Youth Hockey Association ===
The 2011–12 season was not only the first year for Arizona Wildcats Hockey, but also the first year for the Wildcat Youth Hockey Association (WYHA), which has partnered with Coach and the Wildcats. This allows the older players to pass on their knowledge of hockey and help get a younger generation involved in the sport. During some of the Arizona Wildcats' home games at the TCC, a program called "Mites on Ice" is held during intermission. Between the periods, the younger players of the WYHA get the opportunity to play a game of hockey in front of the crowd gathered at the TCC, just like the older players on the U of A hockey team. This event provides the WYHA with a much larger audience to play in front of than they would normally have, as well as, a way for Tucson to see the other aspects of the hockey community present in the city.

This partnership between the Arizona Wildcats and the WYHA is not only a way to increase awareness and support for hockey in Tucson, but also a way for Wildcat hockey to make a difference in the Tucson community. The university players serve as role models for the younger players- teaching them how to skate, how to handle the puck, and all about the sport of hockey.

== Alumni ==
Many alums of the IceCat/Wildcat program have gone on to have successful careers in many respected fields. Jeremy Goltz, a former IceCat, played a short stint in the ECHL before returning to become an assistant coach for the IceCats in 1995. Goltz eventually moved to Phoenix and in 2006 started Mission Arizona Ice, a youth travel hockey organization in the Phoenix area. From 2008 to 2010, Goltz was the head coach of the Arizona State University Sun Devils, where he won the 2010 ACHA DI Coach of the Year Award. Goltz continues to coach and operate the Mission AZ Ice program in Phoenix.

University of Arizona Department of Economics lecturer Steve Reff is also an alum of the program. Reff, well known on campus for his fun and engaging teaching style, was part of the 1980–81 IceCats team that went 17–1 en route to winning the Intercollgiate Pacific Conference Championship over BYU.

== See also ==
- University of Arizona
- Arizona Wildcats
- ACHA
- Tucson Convention Center
