= University of Arizona =

Public university in Tucson, Arizona, US

The University of Arizona
- Latin: Universitas Arizonensis
- Motto: Sursum
- Motto in English: "Upwards"
- Type: Public land-grant research university
- Established: March 12, 1885; 141 years ago
- Parent institution: Arizona Board of Regents
- Accreditation: WSCUC
- Academic affiliations: AAU; CONAHEC; ORAU; URA; space-grant
- Endowment: $1.69 Billion (FY 2026)
- Budget: $3.04 billion (FY2026)
- President: Suresh Garimella
- Provost: Patricia A. Prelock
- Faculty: 3,374 (fall 2025)
- Total staff: 15,764 (fall 2025)
- Students: 54,384 (fall 2025)
- Undergraduates: 43,294 (fall 2025)
- Postgraduates: 11,090 (fall 2025)
- Location: Tucson, Arizona, United States; 32.2319°N 110.9527°W
- Campus: 392 acres (1.59 km^{2}); Large city
- Newspaper: The Daily Wildcat
- Colors: Cardinal and navy
- Nickname: Wildcats
- Sporting affiliations: NCAA Division I FBS – Big 12; MPSF
- Mascot: Wilbur and Wilma T. Wildcat
- Website: arizona.edu

The University of Arizona (Arizona, U of A, UArizona, or UA) is a public land-grant research university in Tucson, Arizona, United States. Founded in 1885 by the 13th Arizona Territorial Legislature, it was the first university established in the Arizona Territory. The University of Arizona is one of three universities governed by the Arizona Board of Regents (the University of Arizona, Arizona State University, and Northern Arizona University). As of fall 2025, the university enrolled 54,384 students in 22 separate colleges/schools, including the Eller College of Management, the Wyant College of Optical Sciences, the College of Medicine – Phoenix, the College of Medicine – Tucson, and the James E. Rogers College of Law.

The university is classified among "R1: Doctoral Universities – Very high research activity". UA also is a member of the Association of American Universities. The University of Arizona is affiliated with two academic medical centers, Banner – University Medical Center Tucson and Banner – University Medical Center Phoenix.

Known as the Arizona Wildcats (often shortened to "Cats"), the UA's intercollegiate athletic teams were members of the Pac-12 Conference of the NCAA. The university joined the Big 12 Conference on August 2, 2024. UA athletes have won national titles in several sports, most notably men's basketball, baseball, and softball.

== History ==
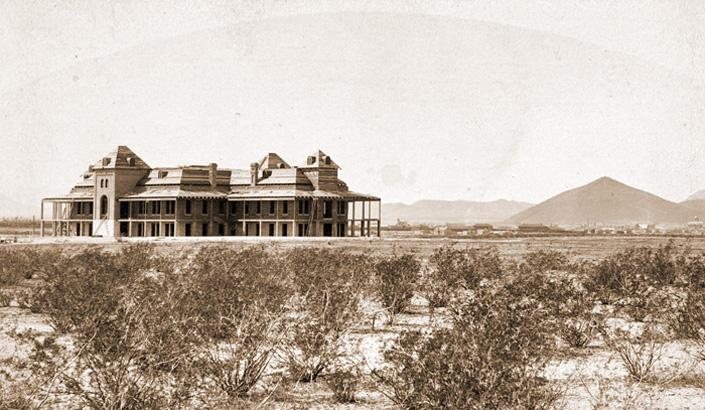
Old Main in 1889

After the passage of the Morrill Land-Grant Act of 1862, the push for a university in Arizona grew. The Arizona Territory's "Thieving Thirteenth" Legislature approved the University of Arizona in 1885 and selected the city of Tucson to receive the appropriation to build the university. Tucson hoped to receive the appropriation for the territory's mental hospital, which carried a $100,000 allocation instead of the $25,000 allotted to the territory's only university (Arizona State University was also chartered in 1885, but it was created as Arizona's normal school, and not a university). Flooding on the Salt River delayed Tucson's legislators, and by they time they reached Prescott, back-room deals allocating the most desirable territorial institutions had been made. Tucson was largely disappointed with receiving what was viewed as an inferior prize.

With no parties willing to provide land for the new institution, the citizens of Tucson prepared to return the money to the Territorial Legislature until two gamblers and a saloon keeper decided to donate 40 acres to the Board of Regents. Construction of Old Main, the first building on it, began on October 27, 1887, and classes met for the first time in 1891 with 32 students in Old Main, which is still in use today. Because there were no high schools in Arizona Territory, the university maintained separate preparatory classes for the first 23 years of operation.

In 1924, during Cloyd Marvin's tenure as president, the university was recognized by the Association of American Universities.

=== Modern times ===
The university hired its first African-American faculty member, Vivian Cox, in 1967.

Three professors were murdered at the school in a shooting in 2002. The perpetrator, who then shot himself, was a student who had failed out of the school. He mailed a 22-page letter to the Arizona Daily Star announcing his reasons, naming two of the killed professors in the letter; following the shooting, the Daily Star made the controversial decision to publish the letter.

On April 17, 2020, the University of Arizona announced temporary pay cuts and furloughs to its 15,000 employees as its Tucson campus shut down due to the COVID-19 pandemic. All employees making up to $150,000 per year were furloughed, with the length determined by each employees' salary. For employees making more than $150,000 per year, pay cuts of 17% or 20% were instituted.

Also in 2020, the University of Arizona announced it had purchased Ashford University from Zovio and renamed it The University of Arizona Global Campus. The purchase was heavily criticized, particularly by University of Arizona faculty members. As Ashford was being purchased by the University of Arizona, it was the subject of an investigation by the Attorney General of Massachusetts, a lawsuit from the Attorney General of California, and a formal notification of concern from the university's accreditor.

A university professor was murdered on campus in October 2022, by a former student. Following the crime, the university commissioned an independent investigation of campus safety. Following that investigation, and one of their own that faulted the university for failing to act on warnings and protect the campus, the university's faculty senate voted "no confidence" in the president and many other leaders at the university.

In 2023, the University of Arizona faced a financial crisis, allegedly "losing track of more than $240 million through accounting errors and flawed financial projections." Subsequent investigative reporting by The Arizona Republic linked much of the crisis to the university's purchase of Ashford University, accusing university administrators of knowing that Ashford was experiencing "a downward enrollment spiral that began years before [the purchase] and dismal graduation and retention rates".

In April 2024, the UA chapter of Students for Justice in Palestine joined student protests across the USA against the war in Gaza, during what they called "Israeli Apartheid Week". The encampment was attacked and dispersed by police firing rubber bullets, tear gas and pepper balls. Bystanders and press were also hurt in the police violence. The students were protesting against UA involvement with companies supporting the "genocide and ethnic cleansing in Palestine" and called for divestment.

In August 2026, the University of Arizona and Gila River Health Care announced they are launching a first-of-its-kind medical school branch in Sacaton, designed to meet the needs of rural and indigenous communities.

== Campus ==
=== Physical campus ===
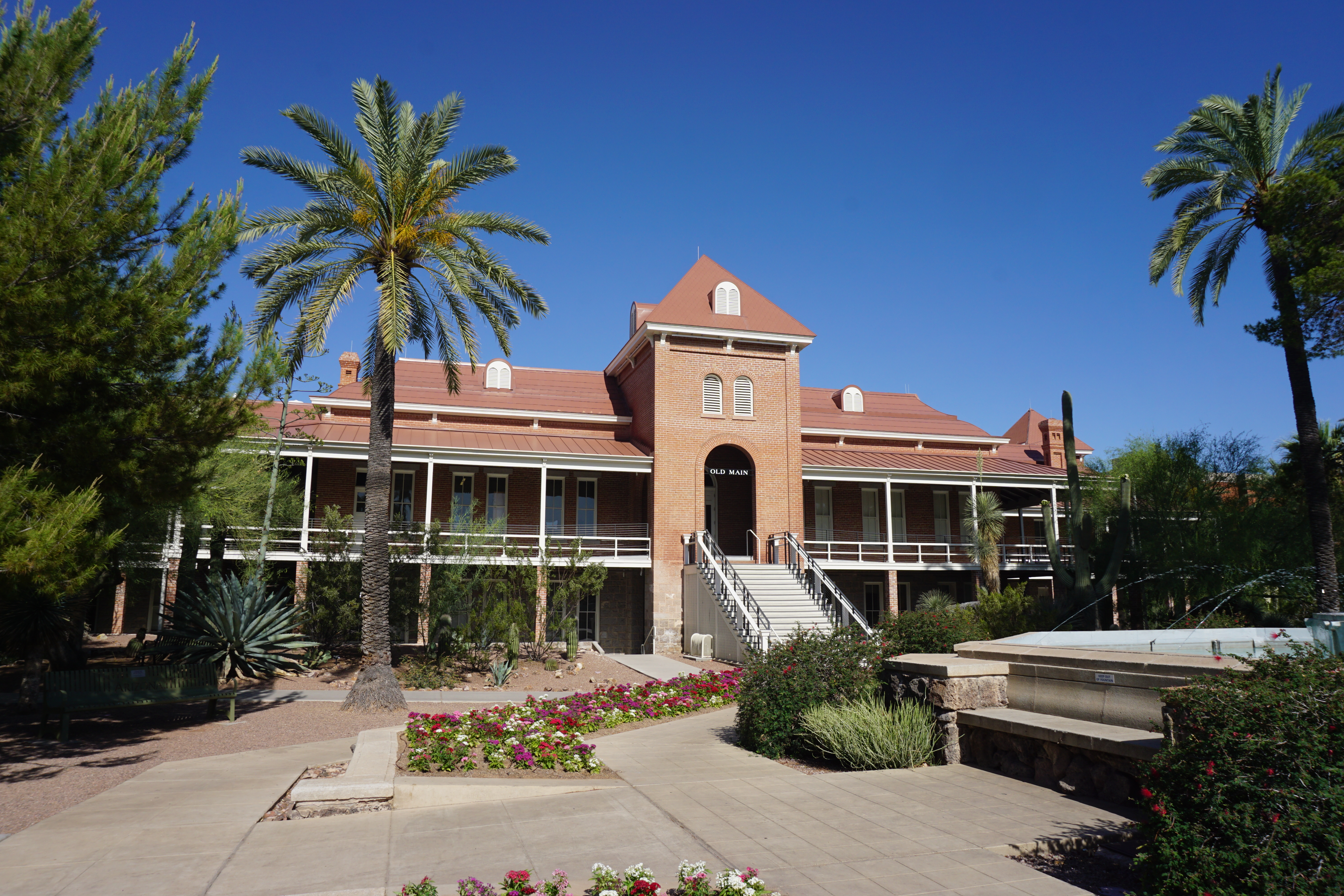
"Old Main" was added to the National Register of Historic Places in 1972.

The University of Arizona's main campus includes 179 buildings spread across 380 acres (1.5 km^{2}) in central Tucson, about one mile (1.6 km) northeast of downtown. The campus is roughly divided into quadrants. A broad grassy area known as the Mall separates the north and south sides of campus, stretching eastward from Old Main to Campbell Avenue, a major north-south street at the campus' eastern edge. Highland Avenue and the Student Union Memorial Center roughly divide the campus into eastern and western sections.

Science and mathematics buildings are concentrated in the southwest quadrant, while intercollegiate athletics facilities are located in the southeast. Arts and humanities buildings are mainly in the northwest quadrant, although the dance department is a notable exception, with its main facilities on the far east side of campus. Engineering buildings are concentrated in the north central area, while the optical and space sciences buildings are clustered on the east side near the sports stadiums and the main library.

Speedway Boulevard, one of Tucson's main east-west streets, traditionally marked the campus' northern boundary. Since the 1980s, however, the university has expanded beyond Speedway, constructing buildings on and north of the street in neighborhoods formerly dominated by apartment complexes and single-family homes. In recent years, the university has also purchased several apartment complexes for student housing. Sixth Street generally forms the southern boundary of campus, with many of the single-family homes south of the street rented to students.

A Computer Science department webcam provides a live view of the campus from the top of the Gould-Simpson building, the tallest classroom building on campus at 10 stories.

=== Architectural design and planning ===
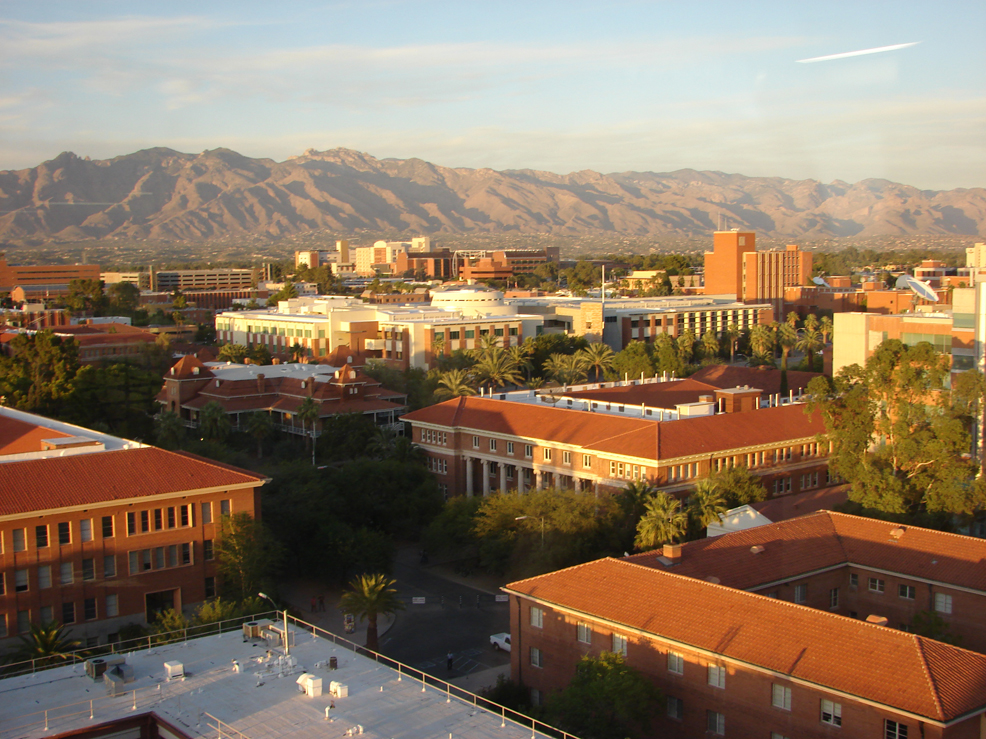
Student Union, Old Main, and Forbes building

Roy Place, a prominent Tucson architect, designed many of the campus' early buildings, including the Arizona State Museum buildings, one of them the 1927 main library, and Centennial Hall. Place's use of red brick established a visual style that still defines much of the campus, with nearly all University of Arizona buildings incorporating red brick either as a primary building material or as a stylistic accent intended to match surrounding structures.

Place's influence on the campus continued into the early 1930s, when he updated the campus master plan. The plan had originally been conceived in 1919 by his architectural partner John Lyman and was modeled after the University of Virginia.

=== Memorial and symbolic spaces ===
The Berger Memorial Fountain, located at the west entrance of Old Main, honors University of Arizona students who died in World War I and dates to 1919.

=== Performance space ===
The Stevie Eller Dance Theater, opened in 2003 (across the Mall from McKale Center) as a 28,600-square-foot (2,660 m^{2}) dedicated performance venue for the UA's dance program, one of the most highly regarded university dance departments in the United States. Designed by Gould Evans, a Phoenix-based architectural firm, the theater was awarded the 2003 Citation Award from the American Institute of Architects, Arizona Chapter.

=== Student Union Memorial Center ===
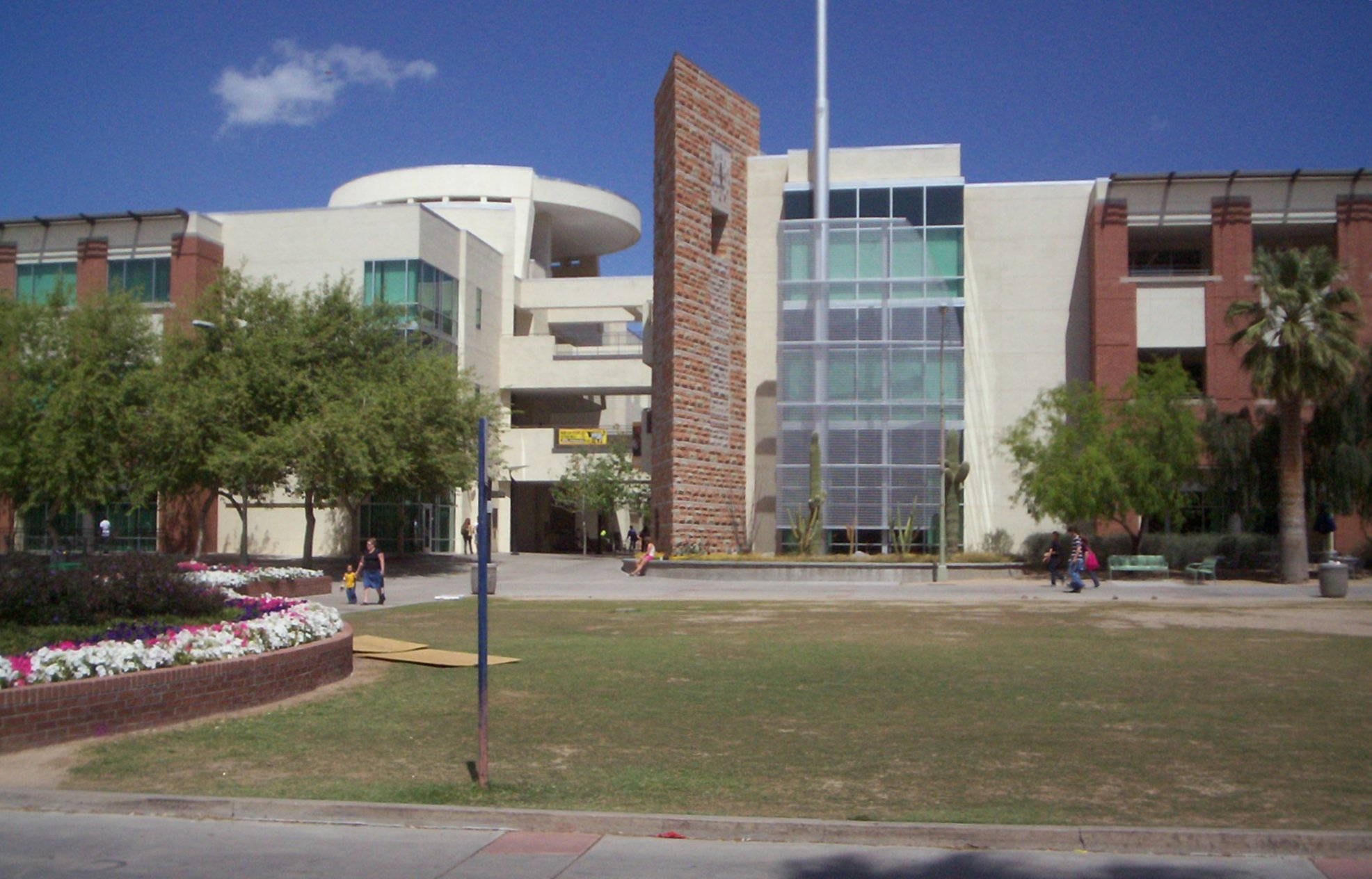
Student Union Memorial Center

The Student Union Memorial Center, on the north side of the Mall east of Old Main, was completely reconstructed between 2000 and 2003. It replaced a 270,000-square-foot (25,000 m^{2}) building that originally opened in 1951 and had been expanded during the 1960s and early 1970s.

Designed to resemble the USS Arizona (BB-39), the building includes memorial features honoring members of the university community and others who served in the military. Memorial sculptures throughout the complex incorporate elements such as the sounds of chiming dog tags and refracted light. One of the center's best known features is the USS Arizona bell, which is housed in the building's clock tower. The 1,820-pound (826 kg) bell was one of two recovered from the battleship after the attack on Pearl Harbor, and arrived on campus in July 1946.

For decades, the bell was rung seven times on the third Wednesday of every month at 12:07 p.m., marking the time of the USS Arizona's sinking on December 7, 1941. The bell was also rung after Arizona Wildcats football home victories, except against other Arizona schools. In December 2020, the university ended the long-standing ringing tradition after the U.S. Navy, which still owns the bell, requested that the historic object be protected from further wear.

=== Arboretum ===
Much of the main campus has been designated an arboretum. Plants from around the world are labeled along a self-guided plant walk. The Krutch Cactus Garden includes the tallest Boojum tree in the state of Arizona. Two herbaria on the university campus are referred to as "ARIZ" in the Index Herbarium.

The campus also boasts hundreds of olive trees many of which were planted by Prof. Robert H. Forbes. Many of these trees are over a hundred years old.

== Sustainability and environmental design ==
The University of Arizona generates renewable energy with solar panels (photo voltaic) that have been installed on campus buildings. In 2011, the Sustainable Endowments Institute gave the university a College Sustainability Report Card grade of "B." In 2015, the university opened the ENR2, housing the University of Arizona School of Geography, Development and Environment set to be one of its "greenest" buildings on campus with features like a cutting edge air conditioning system and 55,000-gallon water-harvesting tank. Designed to resemble a slot canyon in the Sonoran Desert, the 150,000 sq. ft. building focuses on adaptation and reducing our carbon footprint.

== Organization and administration ==
The University of Arizona, like its sister institutions Arizona State University and Northern Arizona University, is governed by the Arizona Board of Regents or the ABOR, a 12-member body. Eight volunteer members are appointed by the Governor to staggered eight-year terms; two students serve on the board for two-year appointments, with the first year being a nonvoting apprentice year. The Governor and the Superintendent of Public Instruction serve as voting ex-officio members. The ABOR provides "policy guidance" and oversight to the three major degree-granting universities, as provided for by Title 15 of the Arizona Revised Statutes.

Suresh Garimella was named the 23rd president of the U of A on August 9, 2024. Previously, he was the president of the University of Vermont from 2019 to 2024. Garimella has also previously served as the Executive Vice President for Research and Partnerships, a Chief Global Affairs Officer, and was recognized as a Goodson Distinguished Professor of Mechanical Engineering at Purdue University.

Garimella replaced Robert C. Robbins, MD. He was named as the lone finalist to succeed as president after Robbins announced his plans to step down at the end of his current contract, or before if a suitable successor was identified, during an ABOR meeting on April 2, 2024.

Notable past presidents of the university include Ann Weaver Hart who was the university's first female president, serving from 2012 to 2017; interim president Eugene Sander, who retired from the university after 25 years of service as an educator and administrator, including nearly one year in the interim president role; Robert N. Shelton, who began his tenure in 2006 and resigned in the summer of 2011 to accept the presidency of the Fiesta Bowl, (a BCS college football tournament played annually in the Phoenix area). Shelton's predecessor, Peter Likins, vacated his post at the conclusion of the 2005–06 academic term. Other past UA presidents include Manuel T. Pacheco (Likins' primary predecessor; the first person of Hispanic descent to lead the university and for whom the Integrated Learning Center is named), Henry Koffler (Pacheco's predecessor and the first UA alumnus to lead the university), John Paul Schaefer, Richard Harvill (who presided over a period of dramatic growth for the UA in the 1950s and 1960s), Homer L. Shantz, Kendrick C. Babcock, and Rufus B. von KleinSmid.

== Academics ==
The University of Arizona offers bachelor's, master's, doctoral, and professional degrees. Grades are given on a strict 4-point scale with "A" worth 4, "B" worth 3, "C" worth 2, "D" worth 1 and "E" worth zero points.

=== Rankings ===
Academic rankings

National
- Forbes: 124
- U.S. News & World Report: 121 (tie)
- Washington Monthly: 192
- WSJ/College Pulse: 325

Global
- ARWU: 151–200
- QS: 287 (tie)
- THE: 138 (tie)
- U.S. News & World Report: 102

Time Magazine ranked the University of Arizona Center for Innovation as one of America's Best Incubators and Accelerators in 2026.

In 2026 the University of Arizona ranked #1 out of all public universities and #2 overall in the Military Times – Best for Vets: 2026 College

National Program Rankings (as of 2025)
Program	Ranking
Audiology	14 (tie)
Biological Sciences	50 (tie)
Biostatistics	56 (tie)
Business	66 (tie)
Chemistry	51 (tie)
Clinical Psychology	31 (tie)
Computer Science	61 (tie)
Earth Sciences	4 (tie)
Economics	41 (tie)
Education	54 (tie)
Engineering	69 (tie)
English	59 (tie)
Fine Arts	32 (tie)
History	50 (tie)
Law	59 (tie)
Library & Information Studies	24 (tie)
Mathematics	43 (tie)
Medicine: Primary Care	Tier 1
Medicine: Research	Tier 2
Nursing: Anesthesia	33 (tie)
Nursing: Doctorate	17 (tie)
Nursing: Master's	20 (tie)
Pharmacy	26 (tie)
Physics	35 (tie)
Political Science	51
Psychology	39 (tie)
Public Affairs	36 (tie)
Public Health	27 (tie)
Rehabilitation Counseling	10
Sociology	28 (tie)
Speech-Language Pathology	11 (tie)
Statistics	54 (tie)
Veterinary Medicine	30

In 2025, The Center for World University Rankings listed the University of Arizona at No. 102 in the world and No. 49 in the U.S. U.S. News & World Report 2027 Best College Rankings ranked the University of Arizona tied at No. 121 among "National Universities" and tied at No. 58 among "Top Public Schools".

Global Program Rankings (as of 2025)
Program	Ranking
Agricultural Sciences	238
Arts & Humanities	88 (tie)
Biology & Biochemistry	180 (tie)
Cardiac & Cardiovascular Systems	172
Cell Biology	227
Chemistry	486 (tie)
Civil Engineering	226
Clinical Medicine	147
Computer Science	388 (tie)
Ecology	68 (tie)
Economics & Business	232 (tie)
Electrical & Electronic Engineering	567
Engineering	401 (tie)
Environment/Ecology	62
Geosciences	25
Immunology	237 (tie)
Infectious Diseases	235
Materials Science	430 (tie)
Meteorology and Atmospheric Sciences	45
Microbiology	106 (tie)
Molecular Biology & Genetics	243 (tie)
Neuroscience & Behavior	220
Oncology	150 (tie)
Optics	165
Pharmacology & Toxicology	163 (tie)
Physical Chemistry	678 (tie)
Physics	161
Plant & Animal Science	77 (tie)
Psychiatry/Psychology	145 (tie)
Public, Environmental & Occupational Health	156 (tie)
Radiology, Nuclear Medicine & Medical Imaging	218 (tie)
Social Sciences & Public Health	176 (tie)
Space Science	4
Surgery	129
Water Resources	31

The Center for World University Rankings in 2017 ranked Arizona No. 52 in the world and 34 in the U.S. The 2025 Times Higher Education World University Rankings rated University of Arizona No. 136 in the world and No. 45 in the U.S. and the 2017/18 QS World University Rankings ranked it 230th.

In 2015, Design Intelligence ranked the College of Architecture, Planning, and Landscape Architecture's (CAPLA) undergraduate program in architecture 10th in the nation for all universities, public and private. The same publication ranked UA ranked 20th in overall undergraduate architecture programs.

=== Tuition ===
Tuition for both fall and spring semesters at the University of Arizona is $12,700 for full-time undergraduate residents and $37,200 for non-residents. As in other states, the cost of tuition has been rising due to the reduction in government support and large increase in administrative staff over teaching staff. Undergraduate students who enrolled in the UA's optional tuition guarantee program in 2014 will remain at $11,591 for residents and $30,745 for non-residents through the 2018–19 academic year. Incoming students enrolled in a bachelor's degree program are automatically eligible for the Guaranteed Tuition Program and will not be subject to tuition increases for 8 continuous semesters (four years). The Guaranteed Tuition Program does not apply to rates for summer and winter sessions.

=== Admissions ===
The UA is considered a "selective" university by U.S. News & World Report.

In the 2014–2015 academic year, 68 freshman students were National Merit Scholars.

UA students hail from all states in the U.S. While nearly 69% of students are from Arizona, nearly 11% are from California, and 8% are international.

First-year undergraduate fall admissions statistics
	2023	2022	2021	2020	2019	2018	2017	2016	2015	2014	2013
Applicants	56,466	52,103	48,202	43,540	40,854	39,941	36,166	35,236	32,723	26,481	26,329
Admits	48,369	45,195	41,996	37,064	34,557	33,714	28,433	26,961	24,417	20,546	20,251
% Admitted	85.7	86.7	85.4	85.1	84.6	84.4	78.6	76.5	74.6	77.5	76.9
Enrolled	9,207	9,221	8,622	7,449	7,740	7,795	7,360	7,753	7,466	7,744	6,881
Avg GPA	3.58	3.66	3.61				3.43	3.48	3.38	3.37	3.40
Average SAT*	1265	1265	1275				1015–1250	1010–1230	1010–1230	1000–1230	990–1220
* SAT out of 1600

=== Honors College ===
The University of Arizona W.A. Franke Honors College provides a program for over 4,500 students that creates a smaller community feel like that of a liberal arts college within a large research institution. It started in 1962 with an acceptance of seventy-five students and has grown to 5,508 in the academic year 2016–2017. It was renamed from the Honors College to the W.A. Franke Honors College in recognition of a $25 million gift commitment made by William A. "Bill" Franke.

== Research ==
=== Research profile and funding ===
Arizona is classified among "R1: Doctoral Universities – Very high research activity". The University of Arizona achieved $1.012 billion in research expenditures for fiscal year 2024, ranking 19th among public universities nationwide.The University of Arizona is the fourth most awarded public university by NASA for research.

UA students have been selected as Truman, Rhodes, Goldwater, and Fulbright Scholars. According to The Chronicle of Higher Education, UA is among the top 25 producers of Fulbright awards in the U.S.

UA is a member of the Association of Universities for Research in Astronomy, a consortium of institutions pursuing research in astronomy. The association operates observatories and telescopes, notably Kitt Peak National Observatory just outside Tucson. UA is a member of the Association of American Universities.

=== Space science and planetary research ===
Space science and planetary research at the University of Arizona are largely conducted through the Lunar and Planetary Laboratory (LPL), which has led or contributed to numerous NASA missions. The university received more than $325 million for the LPL to lead NASA's 2007–08 Phoenix Mars Mission, which explored the Martian Arctic. It later received another $800 million for the OSIRIS-REx mission, the first mission in U.S. history to collect a sample from an asteroid.

The LPL's contributions to the Cassini mission orbiting Saturn were larger than those of any other university in the world. University researchers designed and operated the spacecraft's atmospheric radiation and imaging investigations.

The university also operates the HiRISE camera aboard the Mars Reconnaissance Orbiter. The spacecraft reached Mars in March 2006 after traveling 300 million miles. The University of Arizona-designed camera was led by planetary scientist Alfred McEwen, the project's principal investigator. HiRISE captured high-resolution images of the planet.

In 2011, University of Arizona alumnus and planetary scientist Lujendra Ojha and his research team used HiRISE imagery to identify evidence of liquid water on the surface of Mars. NASA confirmed the discovery in 2015. The university receives more NASA grants annually than the next nine top NASA-Jet Propulsion Laboratory-funded universities combined.

In August 2007, the University of Arizona, under the direction of planetary scientist Peter Smith, led the Phoenix Mars Mission. It was the first space mission completely controlled by a university. The spacecraft reached the Martian surface in May 2008. Its mission focused on improving scientific understanding of the Martian Arctic.

As of March 2016, the Lunar and Planetary Laboratory was involved in ten spacecraft missions. These included Cassini VIMS, Grail, the HiRISE camera orbiting Mars, the Juno mission orbiting Jupiter, Lunar Reconnaissance Orbiter (LRO), MAVEN, Solar Probe Plus, Rosetta's VIRTIS, WISE, and OSIRIS-REx. Maven studies Mars' upper atmosphere and its interactions with the Sun. Solar Probe Plus was the first mission designed to enter the Sun's atmosphere. OSIRIS-REx, the first U.S. sample-return mission to a near-Earth asteroid, launched on September 8, 2016.

The Arizona Radio Observatory, part of Steward Observatory, operates the Heinrich Hertz Submillimeter Telescope on Mount Graham.

=== Computing, environmental, and interdisciplinary research ===
The National Science Foundation funded the iPlant Collaborative in 2008 with a $50 million grant. In 2013, iPlant Collaborative received a $50 million renewal grant. Rebranded in late 2015 as "CyVerse", the collaborative cloud-based data management platform is moving beyond life sciences to provide cloud-computing access across all scientific disciplines.

In June 2011, the university announced it would assume full ownership of the Biosphere 2 scientific research facility in Oracle, Arizona. Biosphere 2 was constructed by private developers (funded mainly by Texas businessman and philanthropist Ed Bass) with its first closed system experiment commencing in 1991. The university had been the official management partner of the facility for research purposes since 2007.

=== Research parks and commercialization ===
Tech Parks Arizona is the research park of the University of Arizona. It comprises three primary facilities: the UA Tech Park at Rita Road, the UA Tech Park at The Bridges, and the University of Arizona Center for Innovation (UACI).

=== Global teaching and research ===
Arizona partnership with Universidad de Sonora was renewed in August 2017, focusing on a partnership in geology and physics.

Arizona has been part of both theoretical and experimental research in particle and nuclear physics in the framework of the CERN program since 1987. The collaboration was initiated by the theoretician Peter A. Carruthers, head of the physics department, and Johann Rafelski who initiated the quark-gluon-plasma program at CERN. Arizona officially joined the CERN-LHC ATLAS Collaboration in 1994.

Arizona has a strategic program to attract foreign scholars, in particular from China.

Following a 2024 report by the United States House Select Committee on Strategic Competition between the United States and the Chinese Communist Party and the United States House Committee on Education and Workforce, Arizona closed its four micro-campuses in China.

=== Controversies ===
In 2018 UA received funding from the Pioneer Fund, a non-profit institute which promotes scientific racism and eugenics. The funds were applied for by Aurelio Jose Figueredo, who directs the graduate program on human behavior and evolutionary psychology. Funds from the grant were used by Figueredo to attend the 2016 London Conference on Intelligence, where presentations on eugenics are given. Figueredo has also reviewed papers for Mankind Quarterly, a journal which has advocated for racial hierarchy. Figueredo has disavowed eugenics and racial inferiority.

== Libraries ==
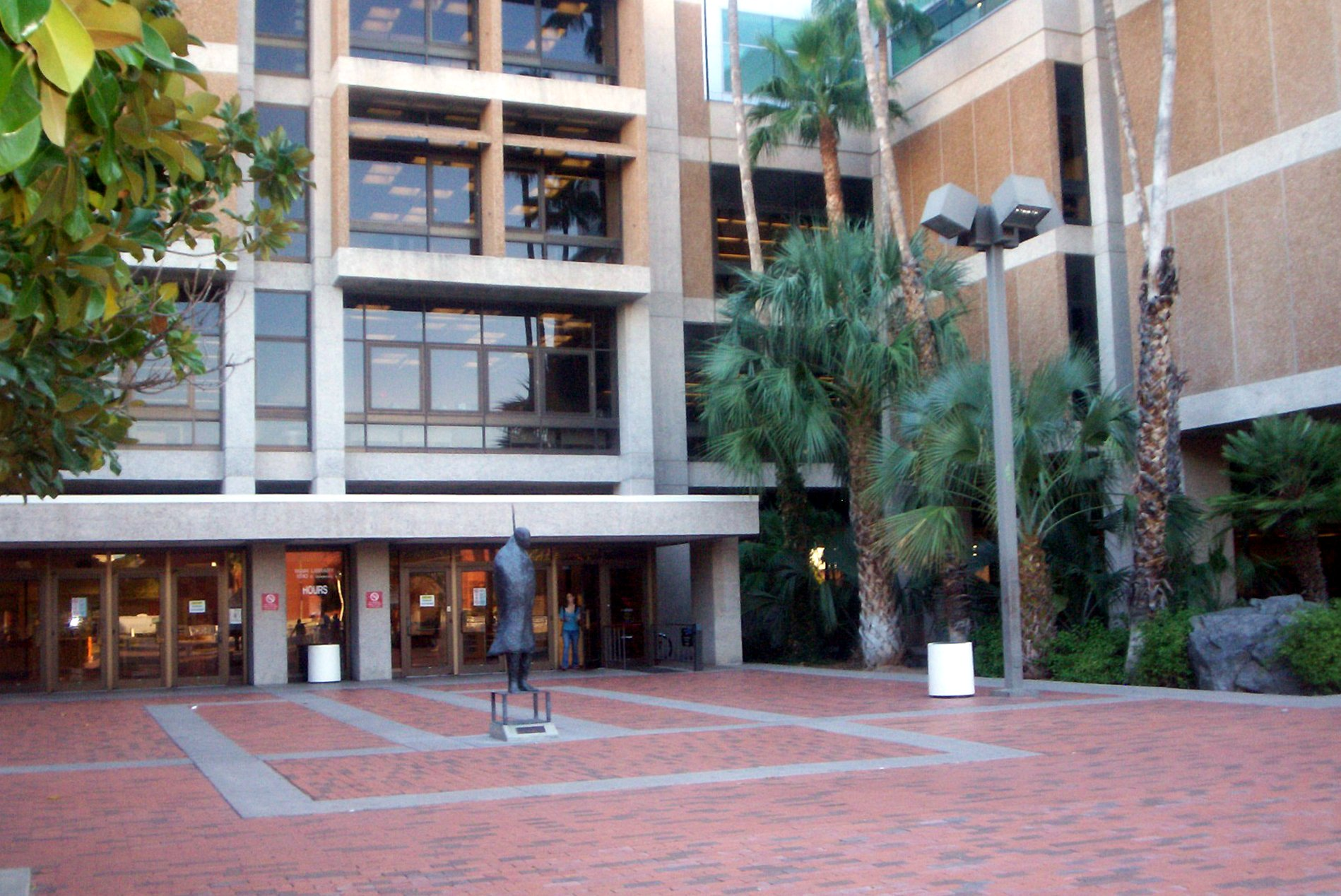
Entrance to the U of A main library, before renovation work began in 2019

According to the 2015–2016 Association of Research Libraries' "Spending by University Research Libraries" report, UA libraries are ranked as the 37th overall university library in North America (out of 114) for university investment.

As of 2012, the UA's library system contains over six million print volumes, 1.1 million electronic books, and 74,000 electronic journals. The Main Library, opened in 1976, serves as the library system's reference, periodical, and administrative center; most of the main collections are housed here. The Main Library is on the southeast quadrant of campus near McKale Center and Arizona Stadium.

In 2002, the Integrated Learning Center (ILC) was completed as a $20 million, 100,000-square-foot (10,000 m^{2}) computer facility intended for use by incoming students. The ILC features classrooms, auditoriums, a courtyard with vending machines, and an expanded computer lab with several dozen workstations and 3D printing. Computers and 3D printing are available for use by the general public (with some restrictions) as well as by UA students, faculty and staff.

The Arizona Health Sciences Library, built in 1996, is on the Health Sciences Center on the north end of campus and on the Phoenix Biomedical Campus, in the Health Sciences Education Building (HSEB). The library serves the Colleges of Medicine, Nursing, Pharmacy, Public Health, and Veterinary Medicine, the University of Arizona Health Network, and is a resource for health professionals and citizens across the state.

An important part of the Main Library is the Special Collections library. The Special Collections hold rare and archival materials mainly in the areas of literature, Arizona and Southwestern history, and the sciences. The Special Collections also have important and substantial collections relating to the lands and peoples of Arizona and the US-Mexican borderlands region.

== Student life ==
Undergraduate demographics as of Fall 2023
Race and ethnicity	Total
White	47%
Hispanic	28%
Asian	5%
International student	5%
Black	4%
Two or more races	5%
Unknown	5%
American Indian/Alaska Native	2%
Economic diversity
Low-income (Note: The percentage of students who received an income-based federal Pell grant intended for low-income students.)	28%
Affluent (Note: The percentage of students who are a part of the American middle class at the bare minimum.)	72%

=== Fraternities and sororities ===
The University of Arizona recognizes 51 fraternity and sorority chapters. As of 2018, more than 16% of students are part of UA's 52-chapter Greek life program.

In October 2026, The University of Arizona temporarily suspended activities for all 21 Interfraternity Council fraternities amid investigations into alleged misconduct, including hazing, physical assault, and drug and alcohol violations. Following mandatory meetings between chapter advisers and the Dean of Students, the university lifted the suspension for 16 chapters, while five remained under intermediate suspension pending further investigation. The investigations were conducted by the Dean of Students Office in coordination with the University of Arizona Police Department.

=== Marching band ===
The University of Arizona marching band, named The Pride of Arizona, played at the halftime of the first Super Bowl. Most recently, the Pride's 2014 Daft Punk show was chosen by the CBDNA (College Band Directors National Association) as one of ten in the nation to be presented at their National Conference in March 2015. In 2024, the Pride of Arizona became the 34th recipient of the Sudler Trophy.

Cochise Hall from the north

== Athletics ==
Like many large public universities in the U.S., sports are a major activity on campus, and receive a large operating budget. Arizona's athletic teams are nicknamed the Wildcats, a name derived from a 1914 football game with then California champions Occidental College, where the L.A. Times asserted, "the Arizona men showed the fight of wildcats." The University of Arizona participates in the NCAA's Division I-A in the Big 12 Conference, which it was admitted in 2024.

=== Teams ===
==== Men's basketball ====
The men's basketball team has been one of the nation's most successful programs since Lute Olson was hired as head coach in 1983, and is still known as a national powerhouse in Division I men's basketball. Between 1985 and 2009, the team reached the NCAA Tournament 25 consecutive years, which is the third-longest streak in NCAA history, after Kansas, with appearances from 1990–present, North Carolina, with 27 consecutive appearances from 1975 to 2001. The Wildcats have reached the Final Four of the NCAA tournament in 1988, 1994, 1997, 2001, and 2026. In 1997, Arizona defeated the University of Kentucky, the then-defending national champions, to win the NCAA National Championship (NCAA Men's Division I Basketball Championship) by a score of 84–79 overtime; Arizona's first national championship victory. The 1997 championship team became the first and only in NCAA history to defeat three number-one seeds en route to a national title (Kansas, North Carolina, and Kentucky—the North Carolina game being the final game for longtime UNC head coach Dean Smith). Point guard Miles Simon was chosen as 1997 Final Four MVP (Simon was also an assistant coach under Olson from 2005 to 2008). The Cats also boast the third-highest winning percentage in the nation over the last twenty years. Arizona has won a total of 28 regular season conference championships in its program's history, and 6 PAC-12 tournaments. Since 2005, Arizona has produced 17 NBA draft picks.

The Wildcats play their home games at the McKale Center in Tucson. A number of former Wildcats have gone on to pursue successful professional NBA careers (especially during the Lute Olson era), including Gilbert Arenas, Richard Jefferson, Mike Bibby, Jason Terry, Sean Elliott, Damon Stoudamire, Khalid Reeves, Luke Walton, Hassan Adams, Salim Stoudamire, Andre Iguodala, Channing Frye, Brian Williams (later known as Bison Dele), Sean Rooks, Jud Buechler, Michael Dickerson, Chase Budinger, Jordan Hill, Jerryd Bayless, Derrick Williams, Kadeem Allen, Aaron Gordon, Solomon Hill, Rondae Hollis-Jefferson, Stanley Johnson, T.J McConnell, Lauri Elias Markkanen, Kobi Simmons, Steve Kerr, Deandre Ayton, Rawle Alkins, and Allonzo Trier. Kenny Lofton, now best known as a former Major League Baseball star, was a four-year letter winner as a Wildcat basketball player (and was on the 1988 Final Four team), before one year on the Arizona baseball team. Another notable former Wildcat basketball player is Eugene Edgerson, who played on the 1997 and 2001 Final Four squads, and spent some of his professional careers as one of the Harlem Globetrotters as "Wildkat" Edgerson.

==== Football ====
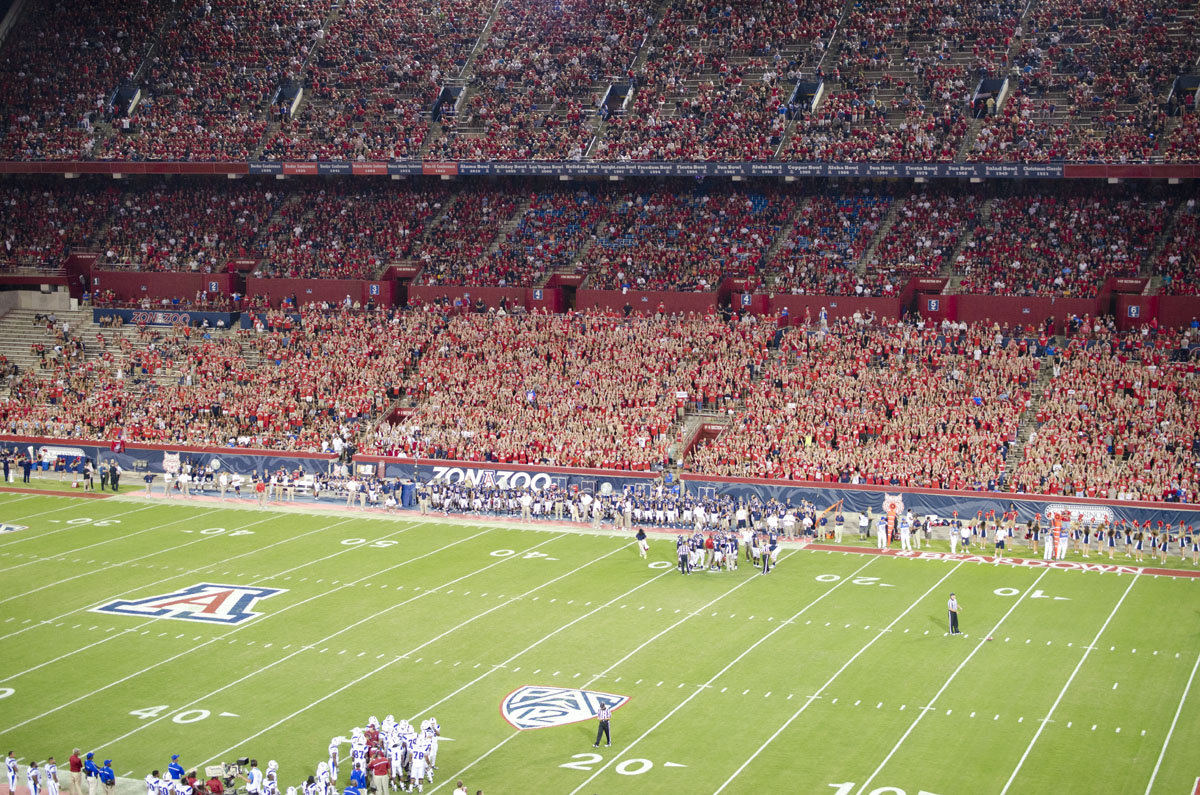
Arizona Stadium has a total capacity of 55,675.

The football team began at The University of Arizona in 1899 under the nickname "Varsity" (a name kept until the 1914 season when the team was deemed the "Wildcats").

==== Baseball ====
The baseball team had its first season in 1904. The team has captured four national championship titles in 1976, 1980, 1986 and 2012, with the first three coached by Jerry Kindall and the most recent by Andy Lopez. Arizona baseball teams have appeared in the NCAA National Championship title series a total of 34 times, including 1956, 1959, 1963, 1976, 1980, 1986, 2004, 2012, and 2016. Arizona baseball has appeared in the College World Series 18 times. Arizona is 7th all-time in games won in the regular season with 2,347 wins. Home games are played at Hi Corbett Field.

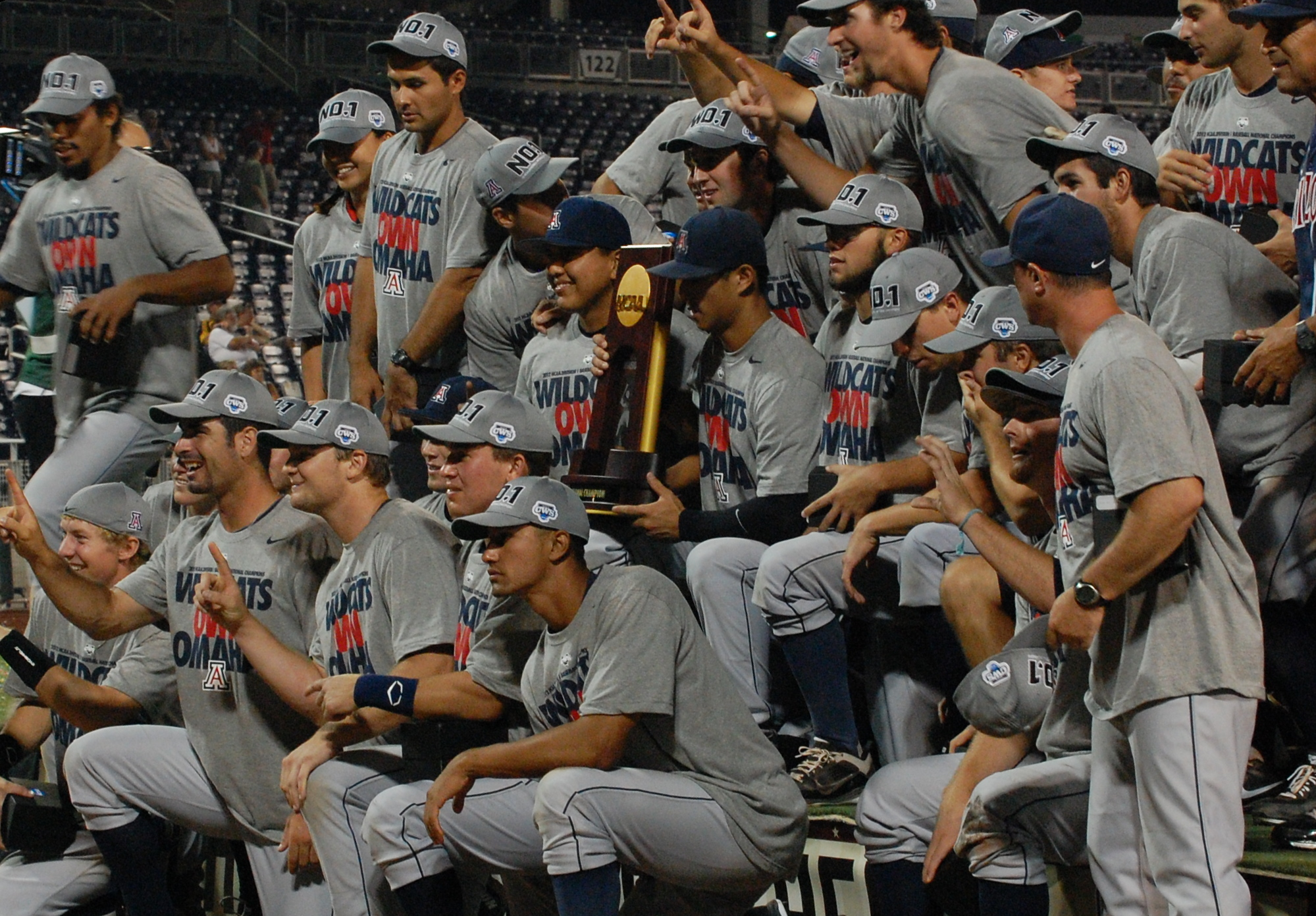
Arizona players celebrating the program's fourth College World Series title in 2012

Arizona baseball also has a student section named The Hot Corner. Seventy-five former Arizona baseball players have played in the Major Leagues. Famous alums include Terry Francona, Kenny Lofton, Shelley Duncan, Trevor Hoffman, Mark Melancon, Chip Hale, Craig Lefferts, J. T. Snow, Don Lee, Carl Thomas, Jack Howell, Mike Paul, Dan Schneider, Rich Hinton, Ed Vosberg, Hank Leiber, Ron Hassey, Brad Mills, Joe Magrane, Alex Mejia, Dave Baldwin, Brian Anderson, Jack Daugherty, Scott Erickson, Gil Heredia, Casey Candaele, George Arias, and Scott Kingery.

==== Soccer ====
The University of Arizona women's soccer team wrapped up their 2017 season on Nov. 17 in the second round of the NCAA Tournament, finishing with an 11–5–4 record, and seven Pac-12 wins, the most in program history.

Led by coach Tony Amato, Arizona's seniors became the first group in program history to make three NCAA Tournament appearances, winning at least one match in each Tournament. The program had only two appearances in its history prior to the last four years. Ten members received PAC-12 academic honors for their performance in the classroom.

==== Softball ====
The Arizona softball team is among the top programs in the country. The softball team has won eight NCAA Women's College World Series titles, in 1991, 1993, 1994, 1996, 1997, 2001, 2006 and 2007 under head coach Mike Candrea (NCAA Softball Championship). The team has appeared in the NCAA National Championship in 1991, 1992, 1993, 1994, 1995, 1996, 1997 1998, 2001, 2002, 2006, 2007 and 2010 (a feat second only to UCLA), and has reached the College World Series 19 times. The Arizona Wildcats softball team won their first Pac-12 Championship in ten years after defeating the No. 12 UCLA Bruins 7–2, and qualified for its 31st consecutive NCAA tournament, creating a new NCAA softball record. Coach Candrea, along with former Arizona pitcher Jennie Finch, led the 2004 U.S. Olympic softball team to a gold medal in Athens, Greece. The Wildcat softball team plays at Rita Hillenbrand Memorial Stadium.

==== Golf ====
The university's golf teams have also been successful. The men's team won a national championship in 1992 (NCAA Division I Men's Golf Championships), and has produced a number of successful professionals, including Jim Furyk. The women's team won national championships in 1996, 2000 and 2018 (NCAA Women's Golf Championship). The women's golf program has produced professionals Annika Sörenstam, Lorena Ochoa, and Erica Blasberg.

==== Men's lacrosse ====
The lacrosse club team was founded in the mid-1960s. In the 1960s, Arizona was a Division I varsity program, coached by Carl Runk, an Arizona graduate and football player. In 1998, Runk retired after twenty-eight years at Towson University in Maryland.

==== Other ====
The Arizona Triathlon team won its 3rd consecutive championship at the 2026 Women's Collegiate National Championship. The program has won three national championships in its four years of existence. It is the 25th National Championship for Arizona overall.

Many other Wildcats have met with success at the university. Alix Creek and Michelle Oldham won the NCAA Women's Doubles Tennis title in 1993, defeating Texas in the Final. Although surprising to some, the University of Arizona has a noteworthy history in ice hockey. The school's club hockey team, formerly known as the Icecats, won over 800 games between its inception in 1979 and 2011. The Ice Cats defeated Penn State for the National Collegiate Club Hockey National Championship in 1985. They also appeared in eight Final Fours ('84, '86, '87, '88, '91, '93, '94, '97) and ten Elite Eights. As of 2011, they are part of ACHA Division I, and are known formally as the Arizona Wildcats hockey team. Robert M. Tanita was a nationally ranked collegiate wrestler who reached the NCAA finals tournament as WAC champion in 1963.

Three national championships for synchronized swimming were won in 1980, 1981, and 1984, though these championships were in the Association of Intercollegiate Athletics for Women, and not the NCAA. Along with winning three national championships in the pool for synchronized swimming, the Wildcats have also won their first NCAA Championship in men and women's swimming and diving for the seasons of 2007–2008. Topping off these weekends Frank Busch, the men and women's head coach, was named NCAA Swimming Coach of the Year. Arizona men became the first team to claim a first-time title since UCLA's win in 1982. Also, the men ended Texas and Auburn's winning streak since 1998. At the end of the meet, the Texas Longhorns took second while 2007's champion, the Auburn Tigers, took fifth. For the women, Arizona worked on the disappointment of 2007's defeat. The women were winning until the last day when Auburn grasped the title. Unlike 2007, Arizona's women did not let anyone come close. The Wildcats won with 484 team points while the Auburn Tigers came in second with 348 and the Stanford Cardinal in third with 343.

Student-athletes from the women's swimming and diving team have been particularly heralded by the NCAA. The NCAA Woman of the Year Award was won by UA swimmers Whitney Myers, Lacey Nymeyer and Justine Schluntz in 2007, 2009 and 2010 respectively. The three awards and the 1994 award won by track and field athlete Tanya Hughes are the highest number of Woman of the Year awards won by a single university.

=== Individual national championships ===
A number of notable individuals have also won national championships in the NCAA. Arizona's first NCAA Individual Champion in the sport of Men's Swimming came in 1981 when Doug Towne won the 500-yard freestyle at the NCAA championships. Another individual champion occurred in 1989 when Mariusz Podkoscielny won the 1650-yard (mile) at the NCAA National Championships held at the IUPUI Natatorium. Some other champion swimmers include Crissy Ahmann-Leighton, Ryk Neethling, Margo Geer, Kevin Cordes, and Amanda Beard. Annika Sörenstam won in 1991 in golf, and Brigetta Barrett won the women's high jump in 2013. The men's cross country has also produced two individual national titles in 1986 (Aaron Ramirez) and 1994 (Martin Keino) (NCAA Men's Cross Country Champions). The women's cross country also produced two individual national titles in 1996 (Amy Skieresz) and 2001 (Tara Chaplin) (NCAA Women's Cross Country Championship). Another notable individual was football standout Vance Johnson who won the NCAA long jump in 1982.

=== Rivalries ===
A strong athletic rivalry exists between the University of Arizona and Arizona State University in Tempe, Arizona. The University of Arizona leads the all-time record against Arizona State University in men's basketball (149–83), as well as in football (49–42–1). The football rivalry game between the schools is known as "The Duel in the Desert". The trophy awarded after each game is the Territorial Cup. Rivalries have also been created with other Pac-12 teams, especially the University of California, Los Angeles which has proved to be a worthy softball rival and was Arizona's main basketball rival for most of 1990s.

=== Mascot ===
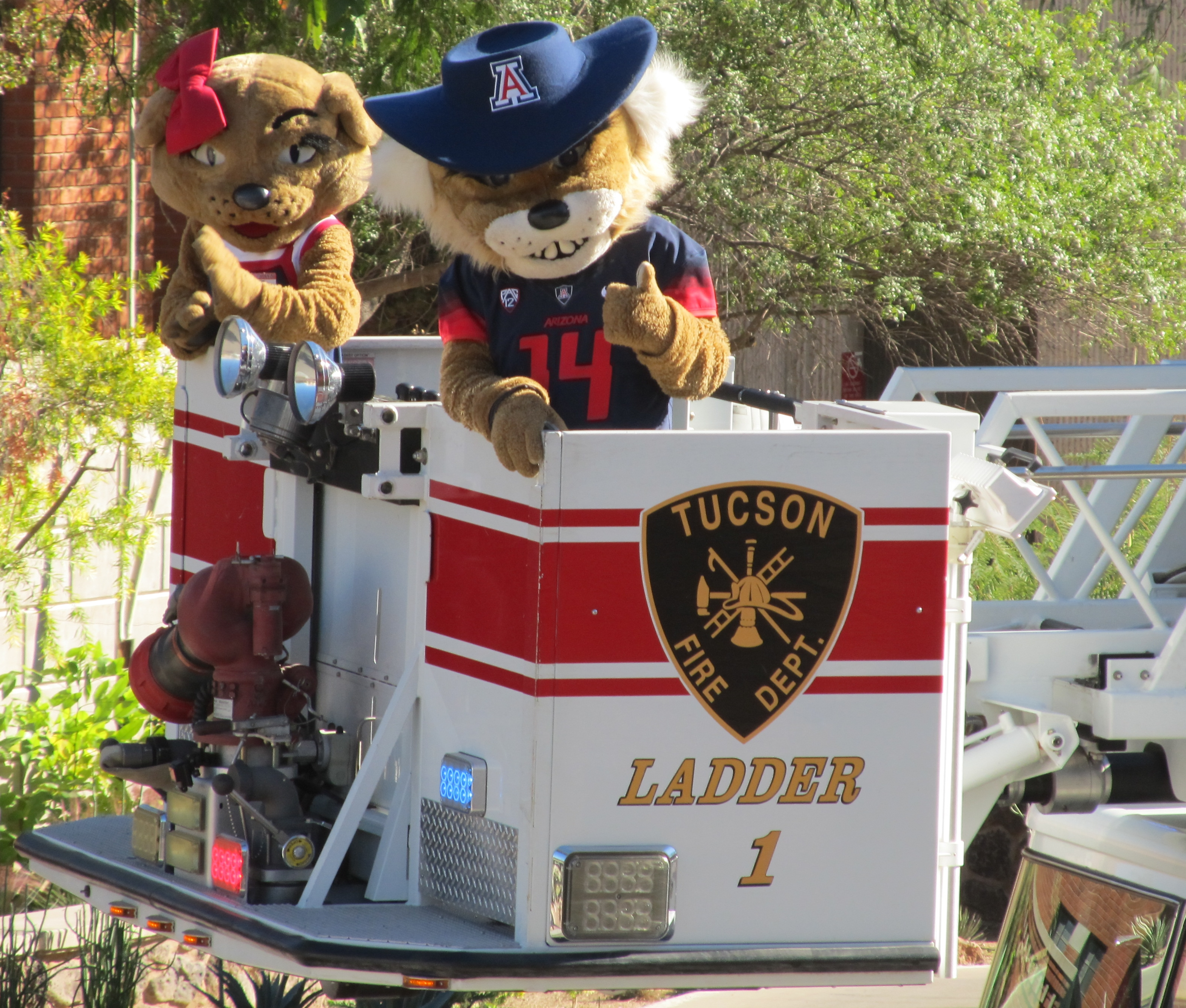
Wilma and Wilbur Wildcat at the 100th homecoming at the University of Arizona

The university's mascots are a pair of anthropomorphized wildcats named Wilbur and Wilma. The human figures behind Wilbur and Wilma are kept secret through the year as the mascots appear only in costume. In 1986, Wilbur married his longtime wildcat girlfriend, Wilma. Together, Wilbur and Wilma appear along with the cheerleading squad at most Wildcat sporting events. Arizona's first mascot was a real desert bobcat named "Rufus Arizona", introduced in 1915.

=== Fight song ===
"Fight! Wildcats! Fight!" is the official fight song of the UA. While "Bear Down, Arizona!" is the more recognizable fight song attributed to the university, it was written 23 years after "Fight!" and is now described as the official motto of the Arizona Wildcats.

In 1952 Jack K. Lee, the new director of the UA's band, saw the words "BEAR DOWN" written on the university's gymnasium and was inspired to create the music and lyrics for a fight song by that name. The UA fans were delighted when the song was played during athletic events, and "Bear Down, Arizona!" became accepted as the unofficial fight song.

=== ZonaZoo ===
Officially implemented in 2003, ZonaZoo is the official student section and student ticketing program for the University of Arizona Athletics. The ZonaZoo program is co-owned by the Associated Students of the University of Arizona (ASUA) and Arizona Athletics yet run by a team of individuals called the ZonaZoo Crew. In 2014, ESPN ranked ZonaZoo as the top student cheering section in the PAC 12 conference and in 2015, and in 2018, ZonaZoo received the Best Student Section of the Year award from the National Collegiate Student Section Association.

== Notable alumni and staff ==
Notable University of Arizona alumni, faculty, and staff include:

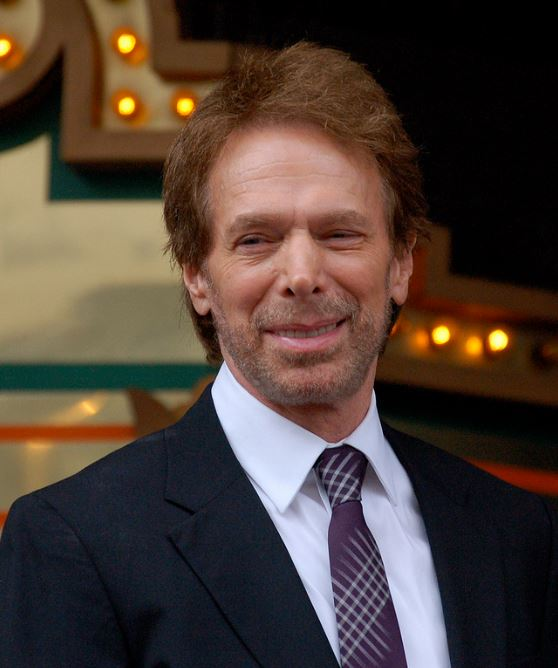
Jerry Bruckheimer, film and television producer

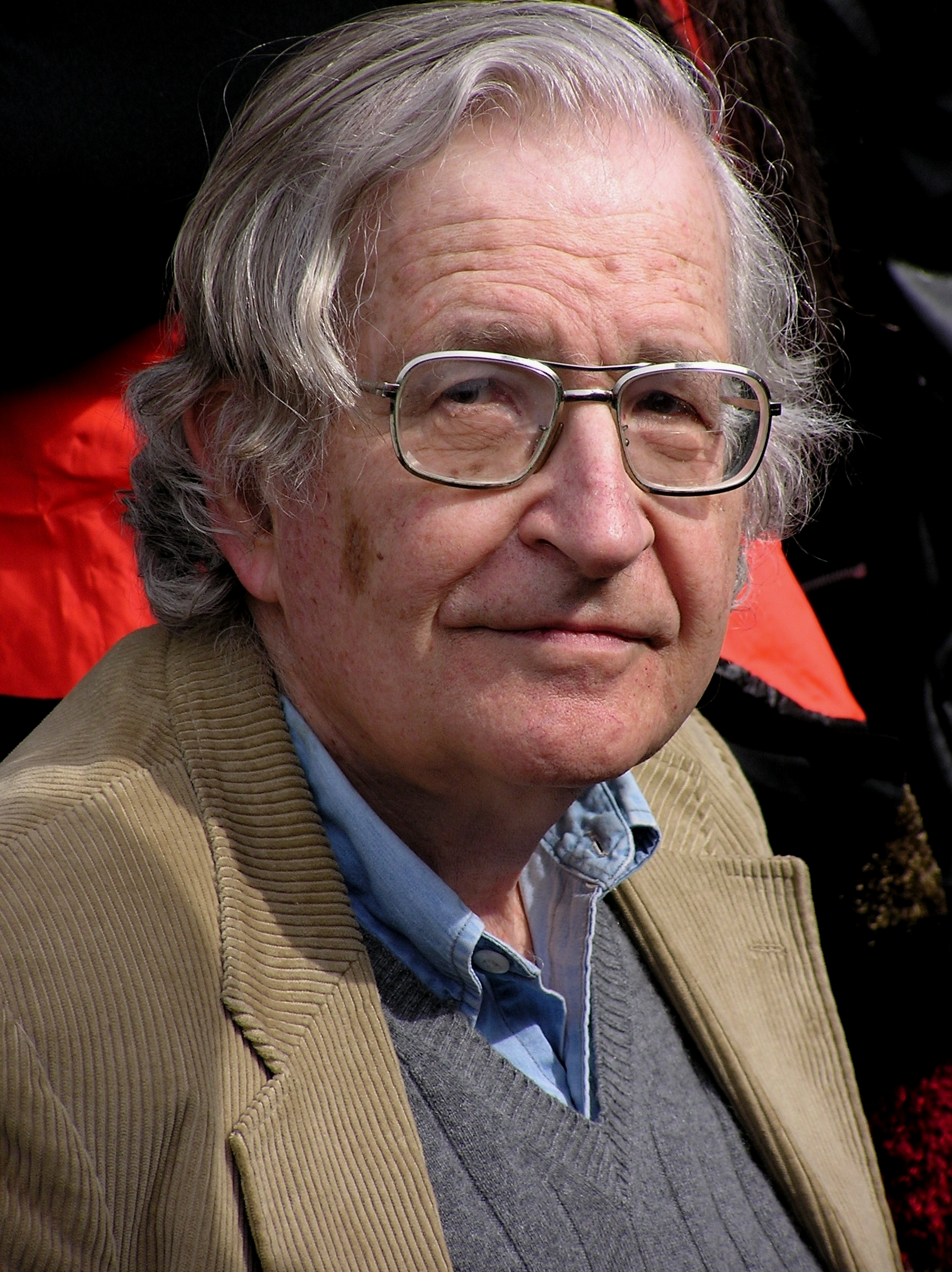
Noam Chomsky, linguist and activist

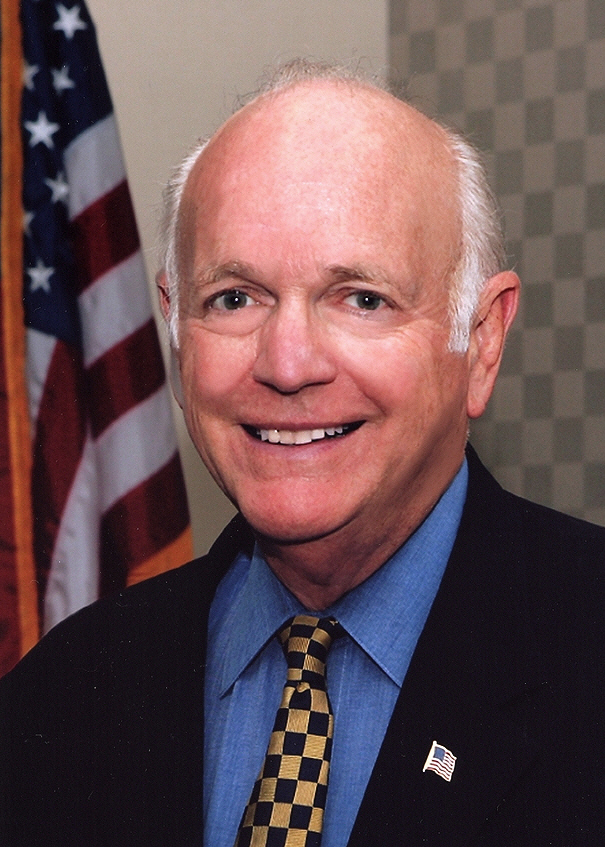
Dennis DeConcini, former U.S. senator from Arizona

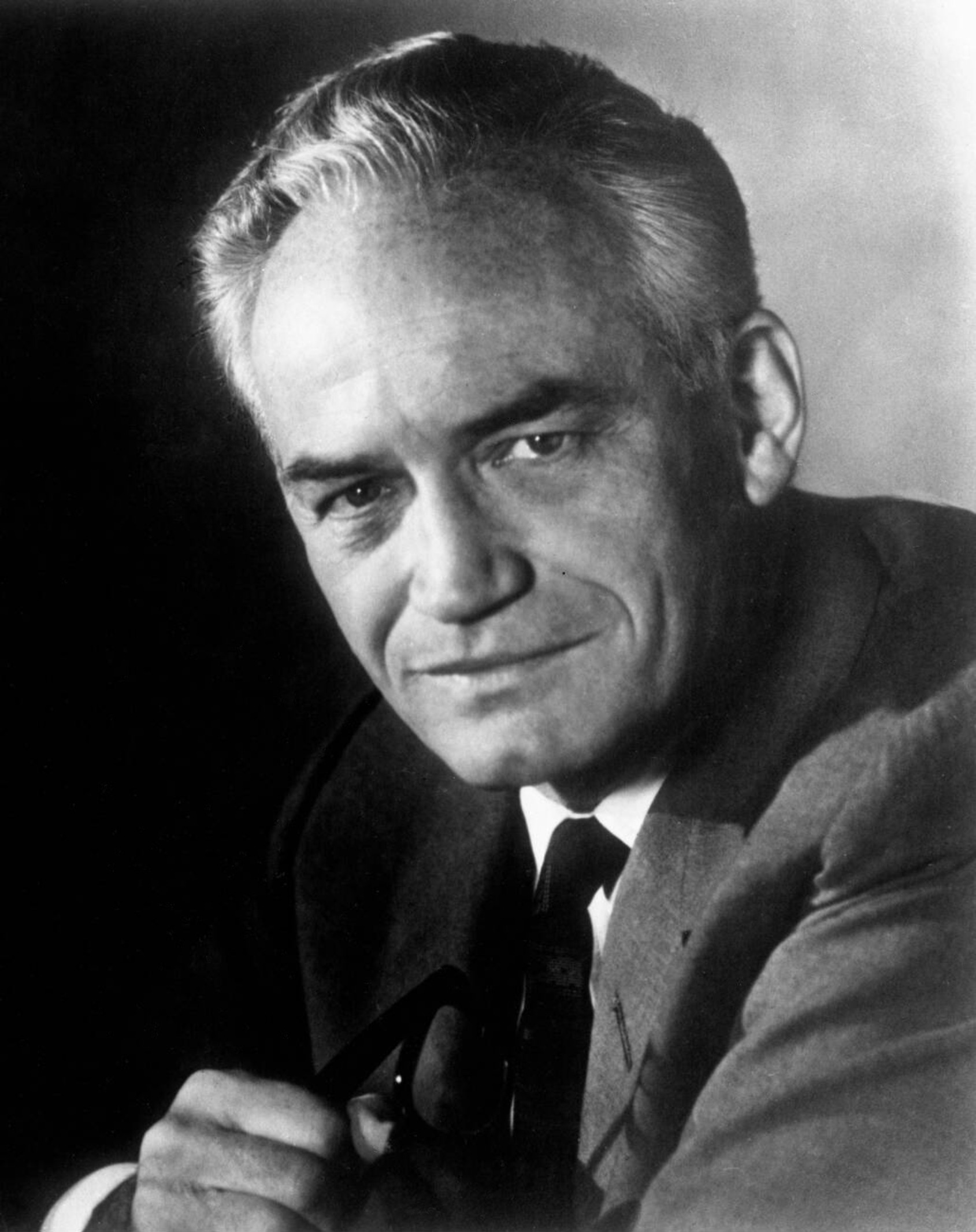
Barry Goldwater, former U.S. senator from Arizona and 1964 U.S. presidential candidate

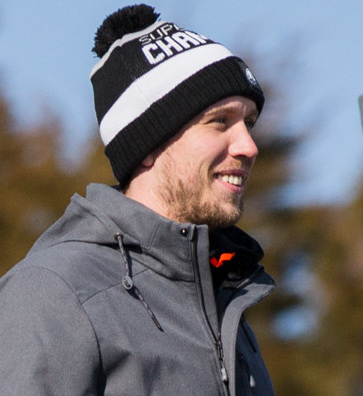
Nick Foles, Super Bowl LII Most Valuable Player

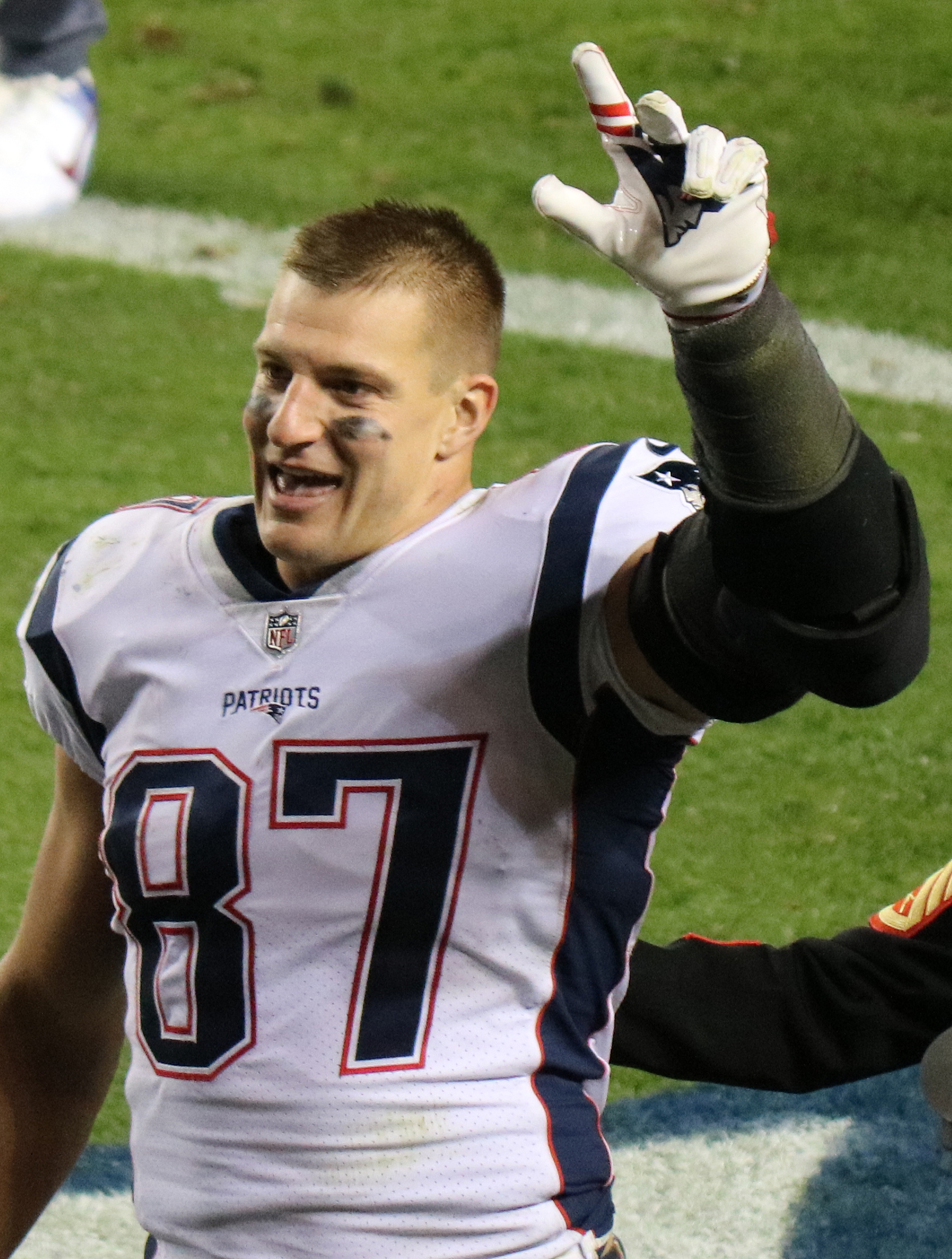
Rob Gronkowski, four-time first-team All-Pro tight end

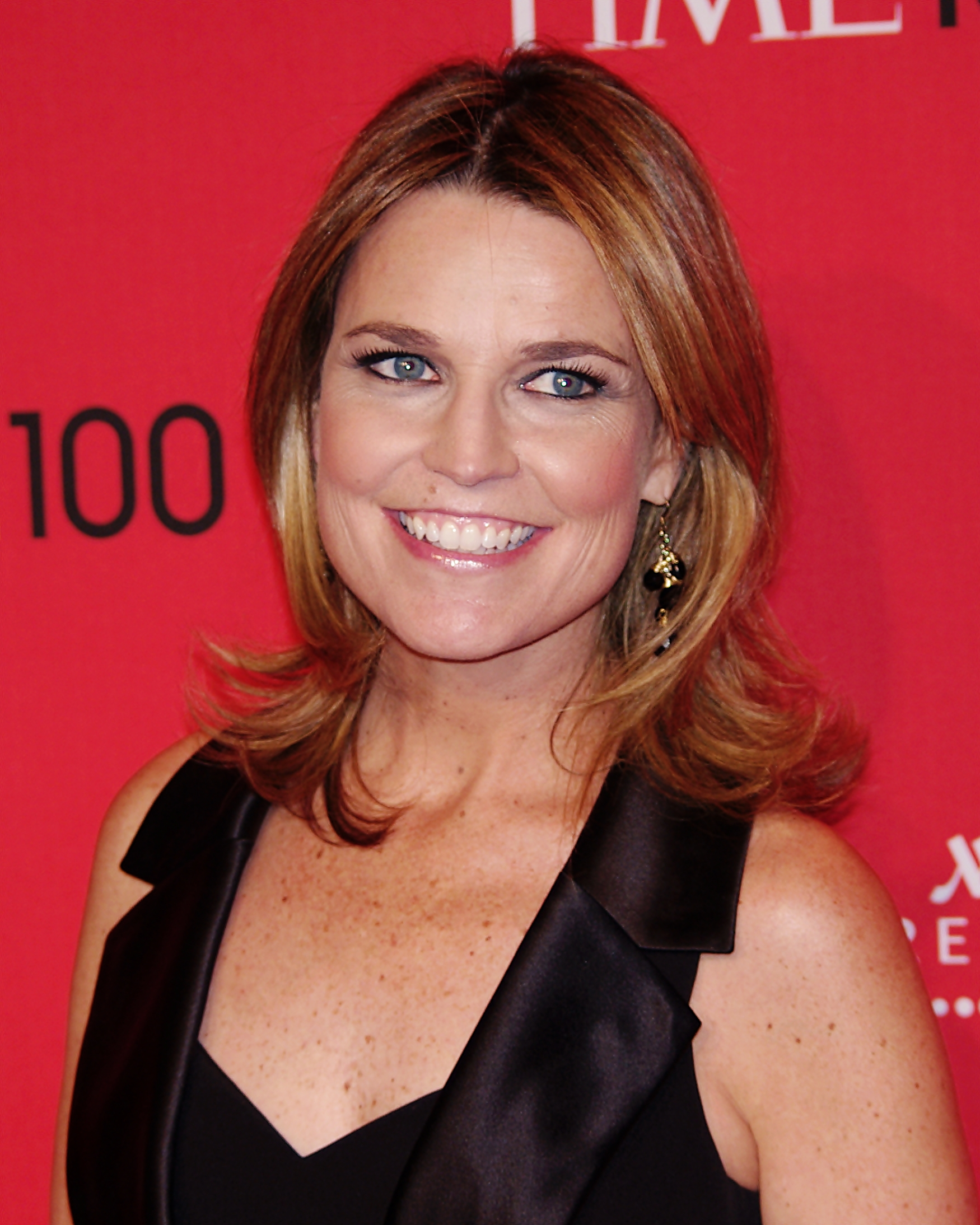
Savannah Guthrie, journalist and co-anchor of Today

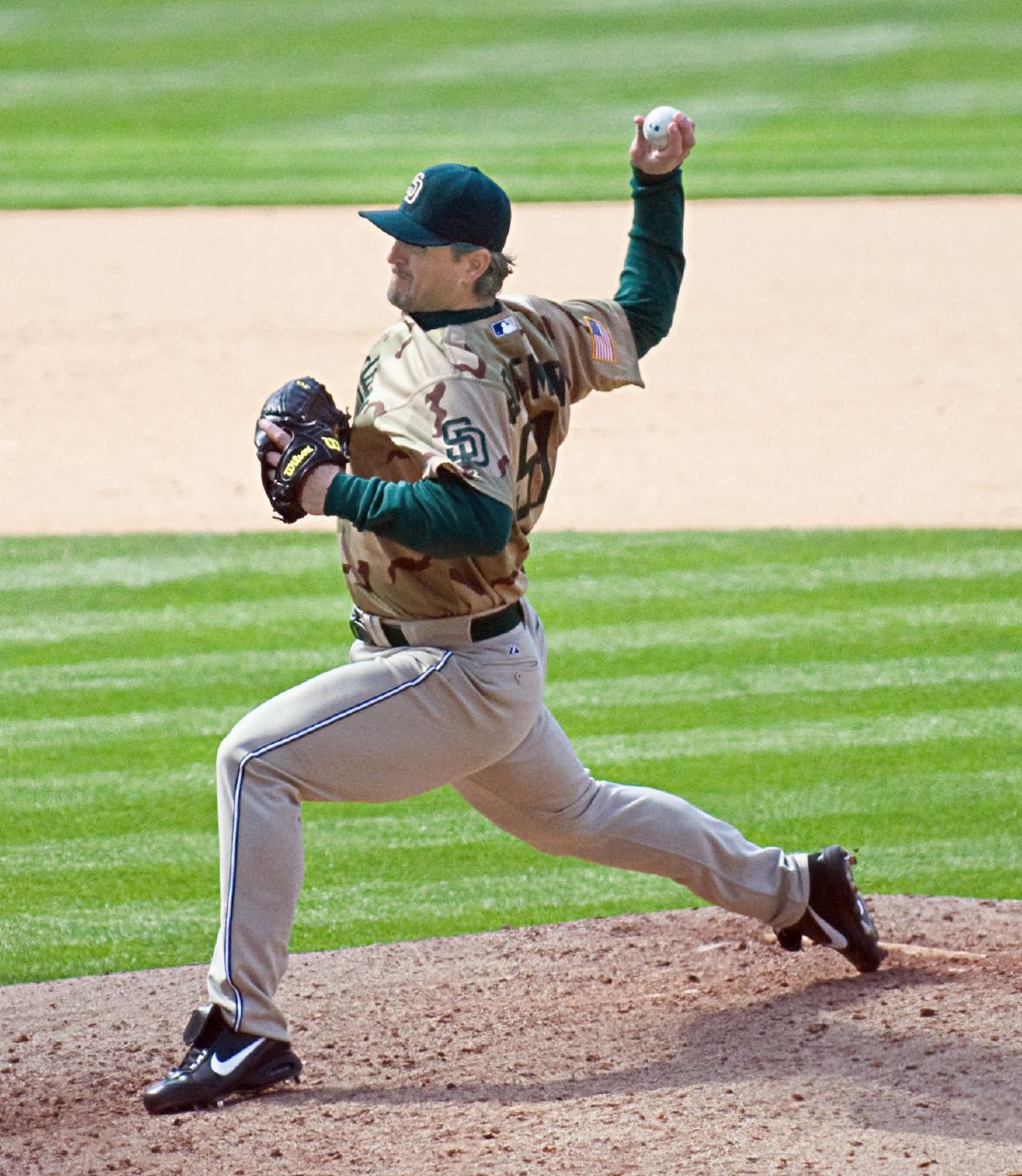
Trevor Hoffman, Baseball Hall Of Fame closer

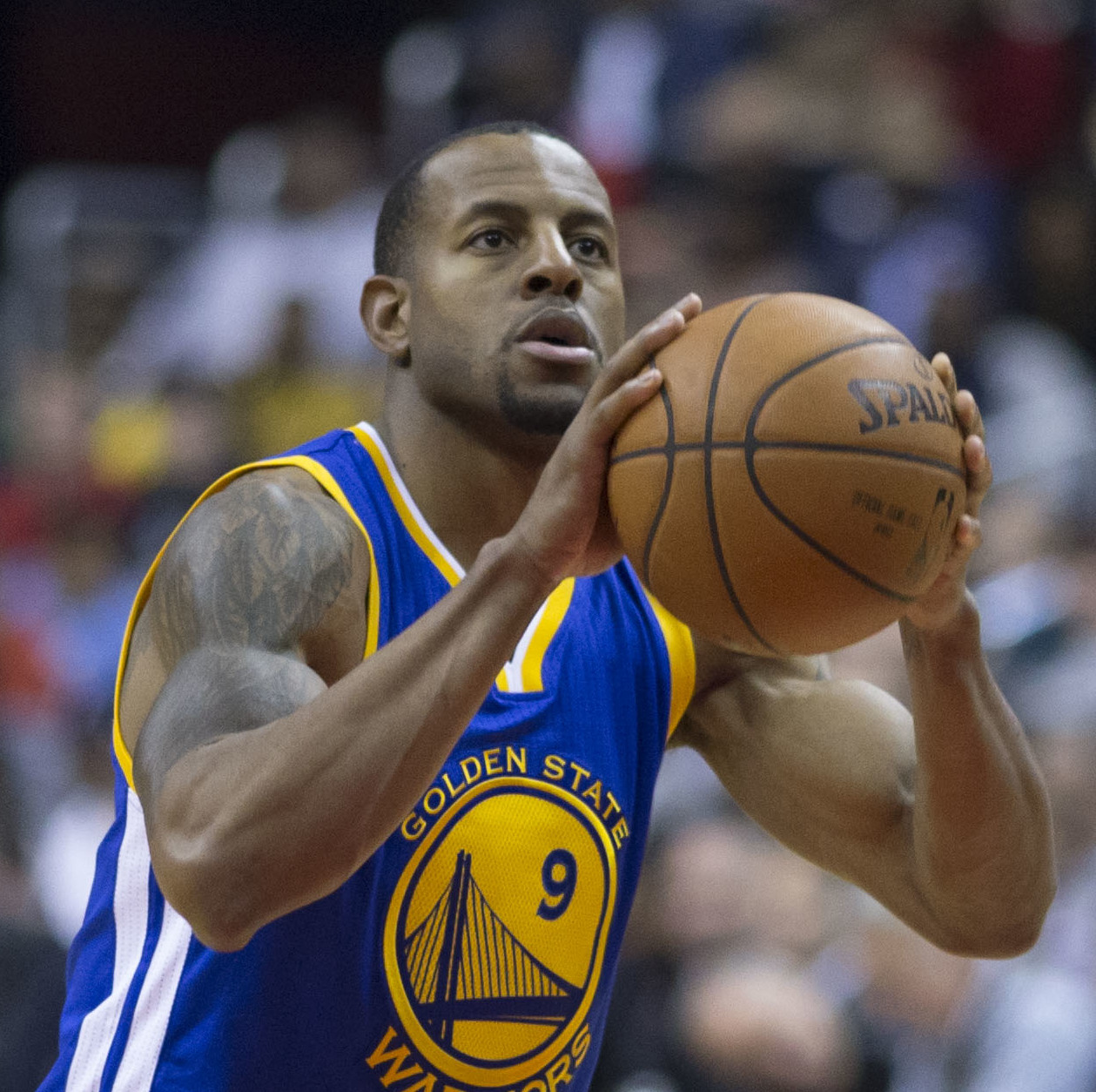
Andre Iguodala, 2015 NBA Finals Most Valuable Player

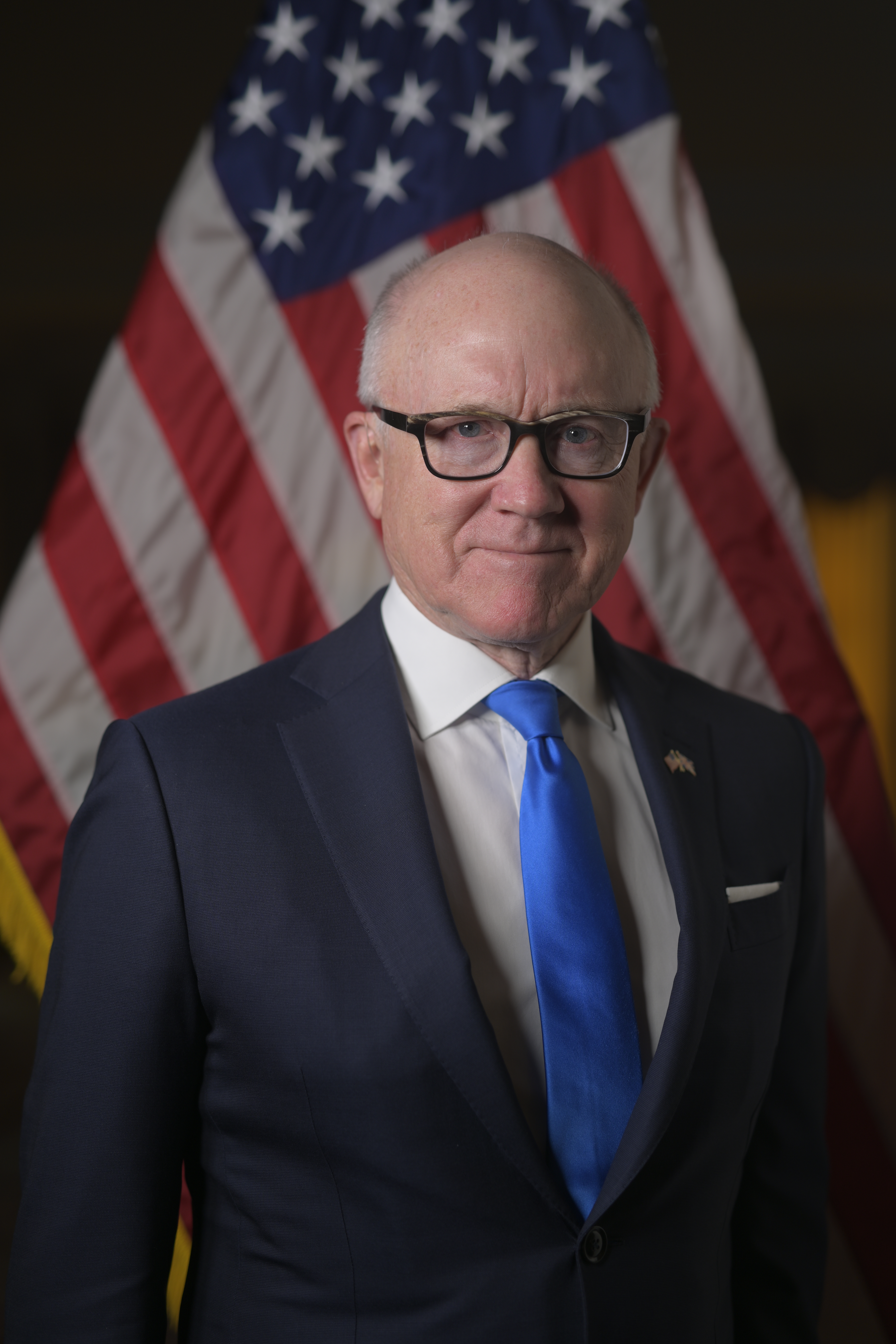
Woody Johnson, businessman and former U.S. ambassador to the United Kingdom

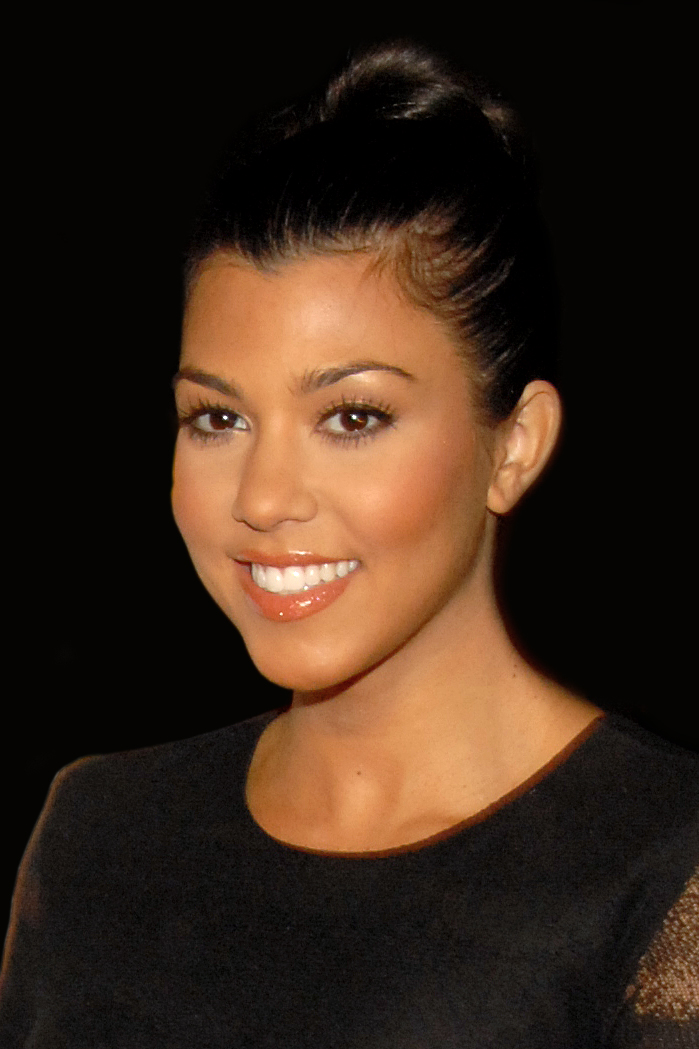
Kourtney Kardashian, socialite and media personality

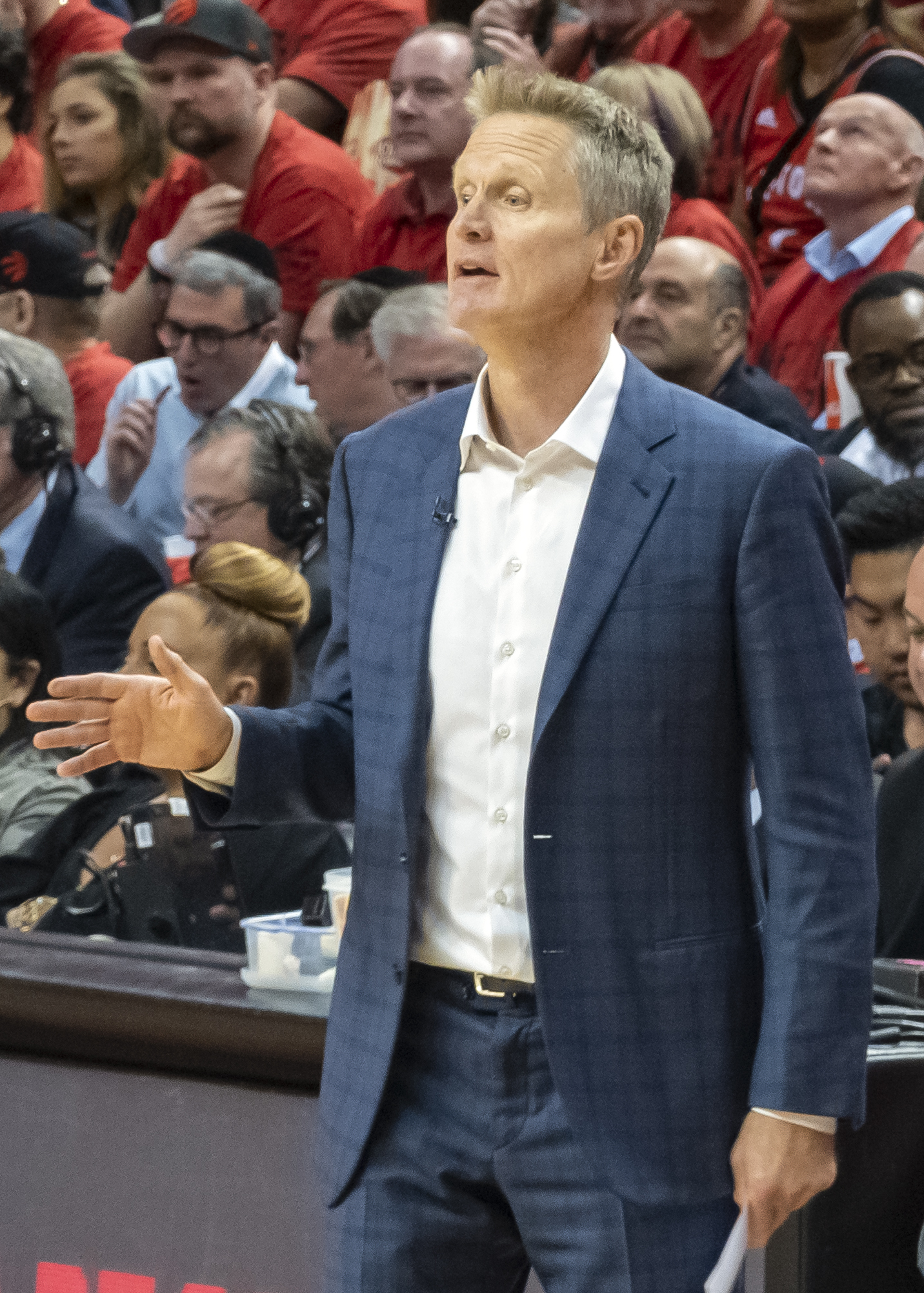
Steve Kerr, former NBA point guard and coach of the Golden State Warriors

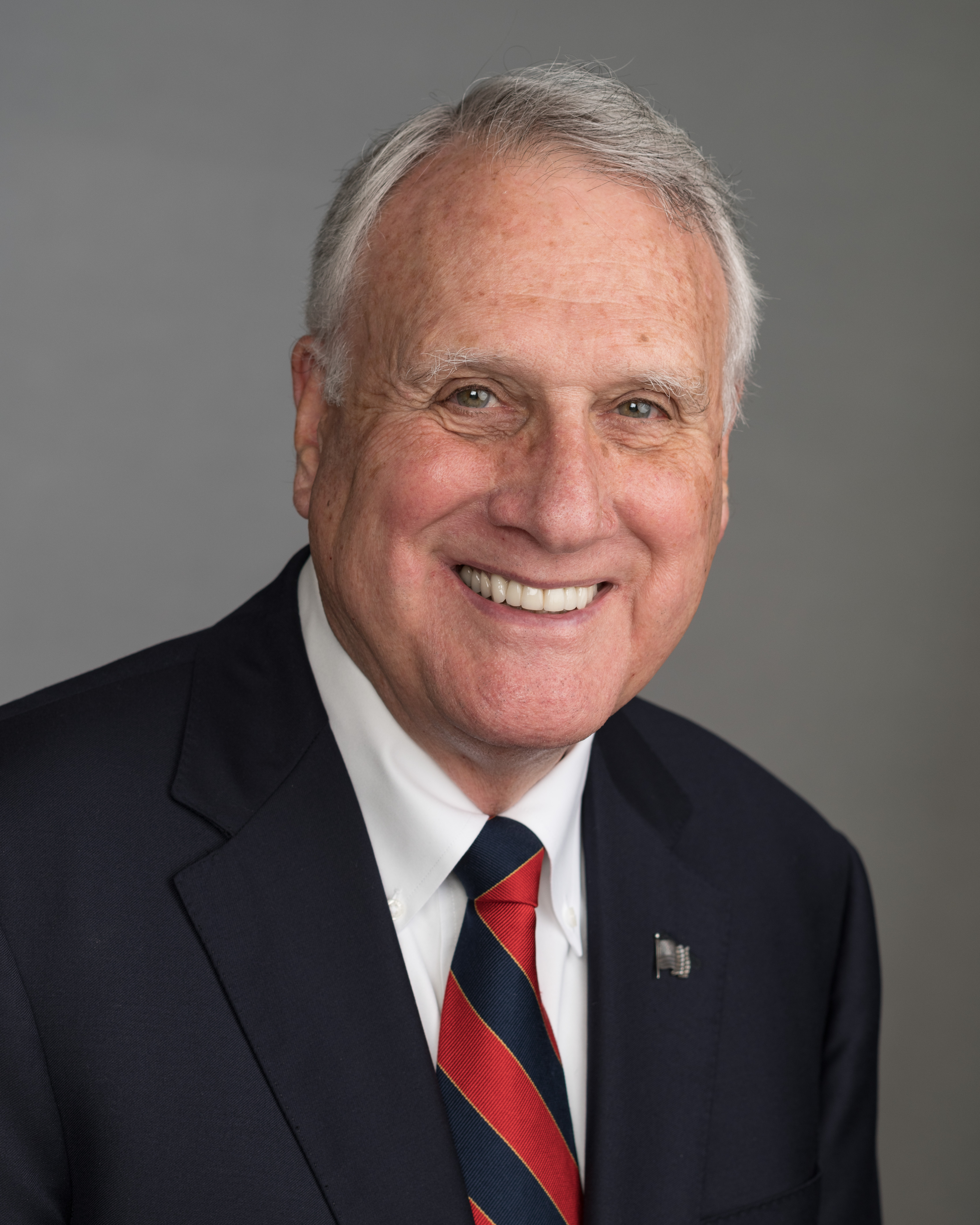
Jon Kyl, former Senate minority whip

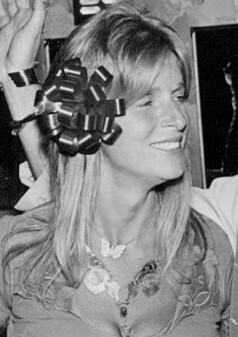
Linda McCartney, photographer and musician; wife of Paul McCartney

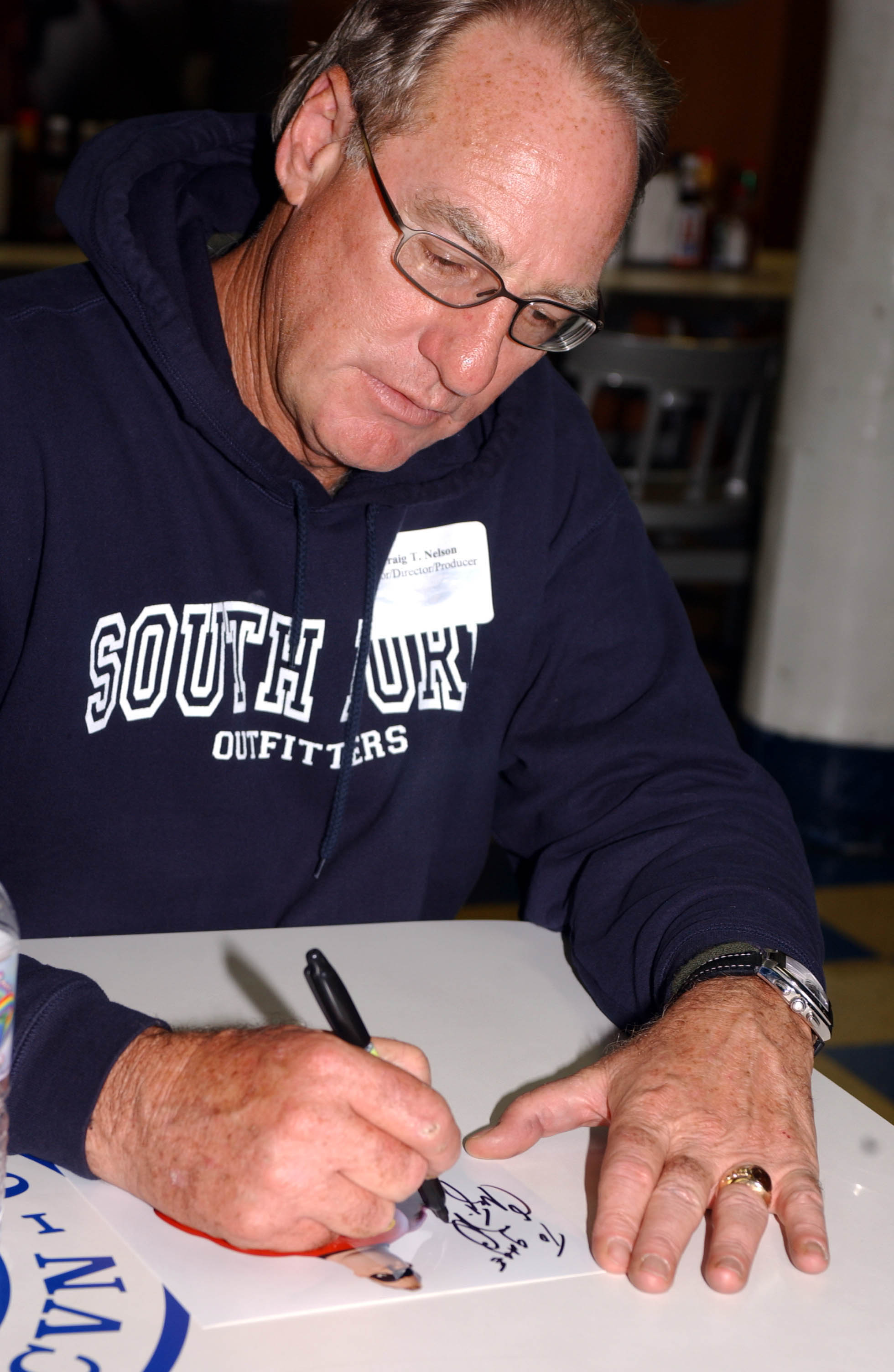
Craig T. Nelson, Emmy Award-winning actor

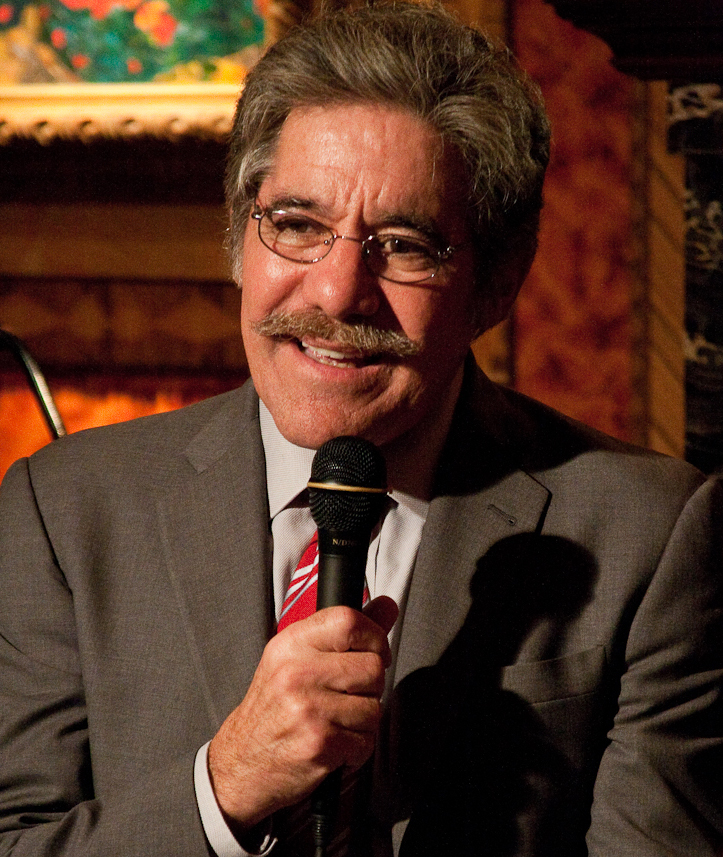
Geraldo Rivera, television host and journalist

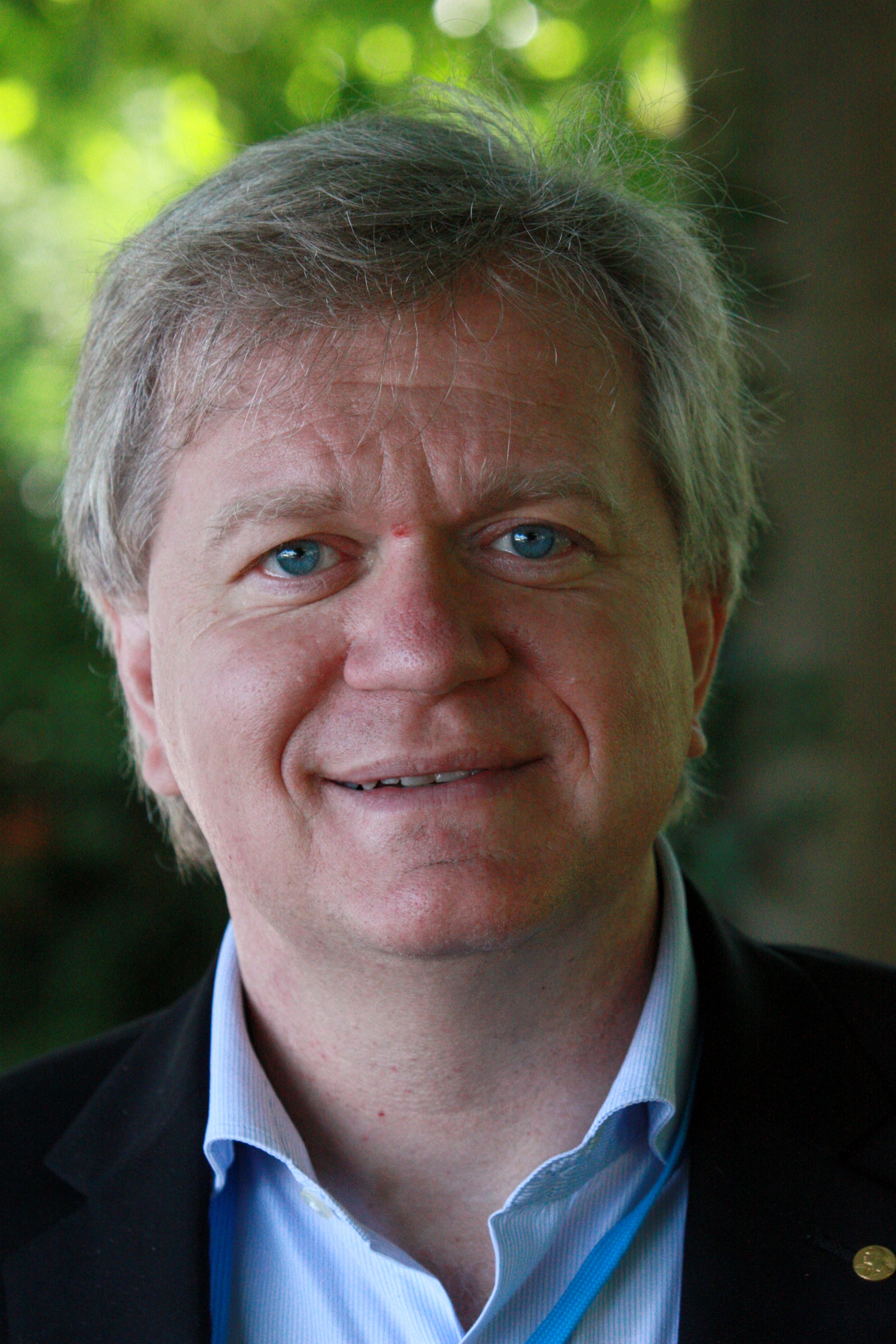
Brian Schmidt, Nobel Prize in Physics laureate and vice-chancellor of Australian National University

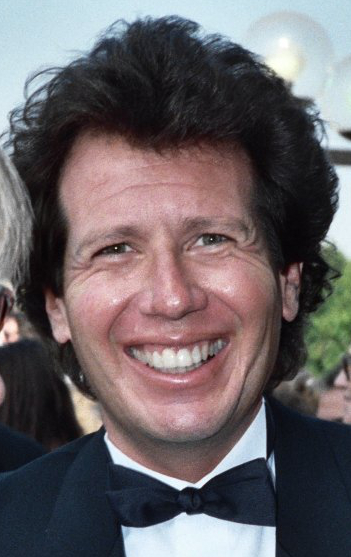
Garry Shandling, actor and comedian

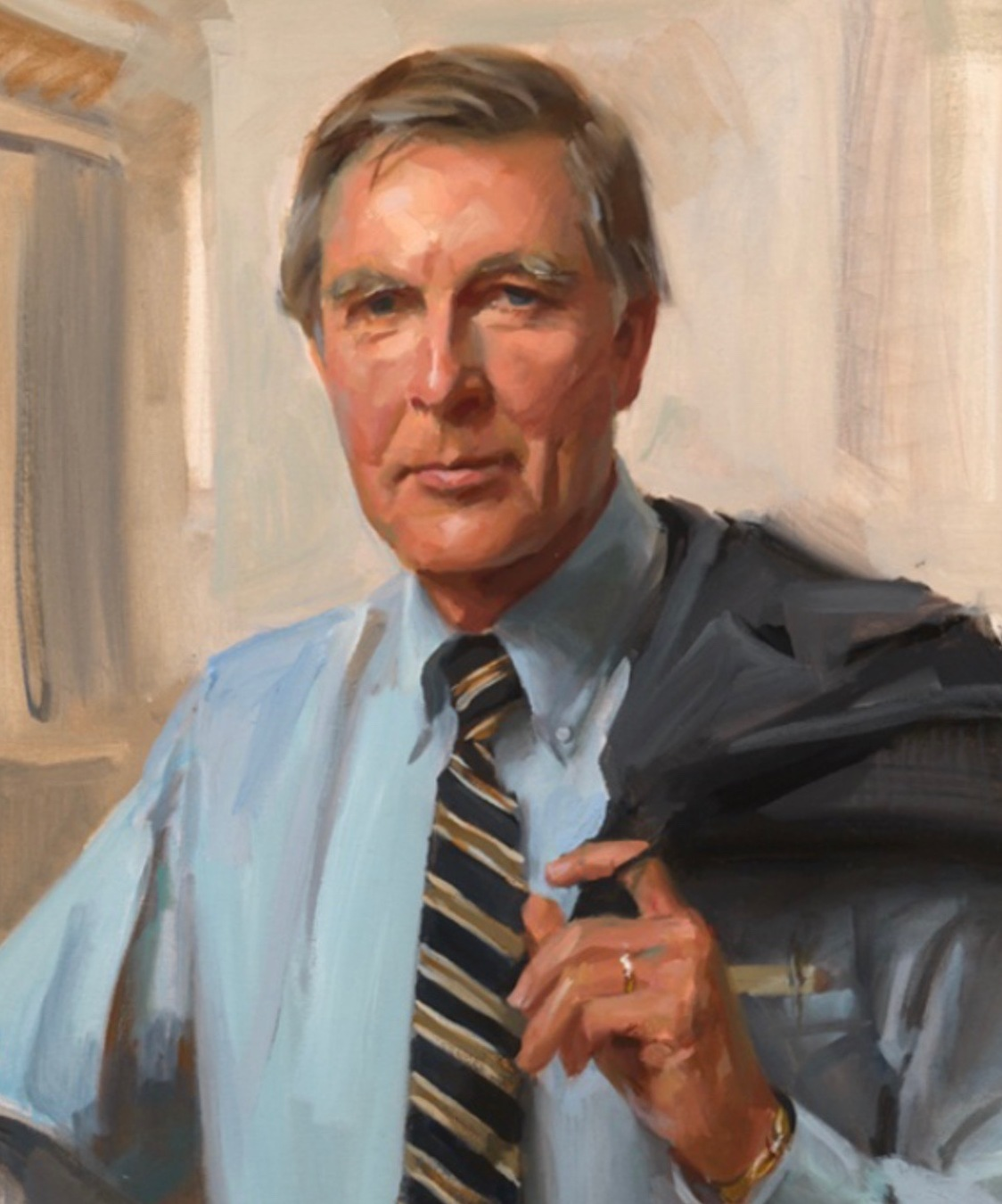
Former U.S. Representative Morris K. Udall

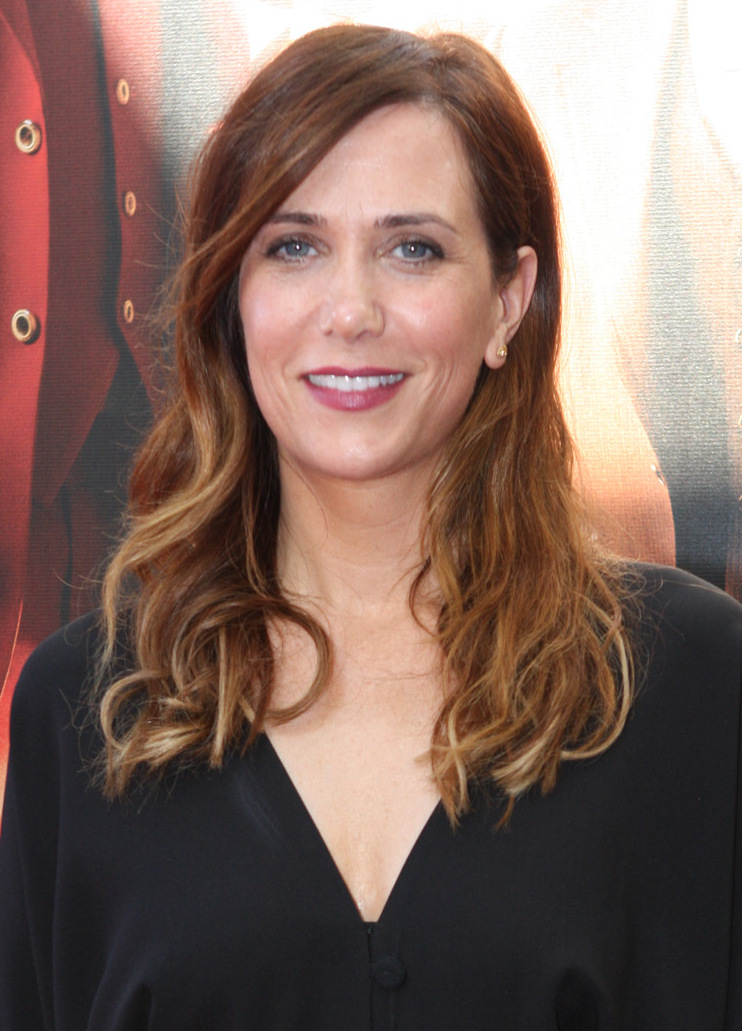
Kristen Wiig, actress and comedian

== See also ==
- Arizona School liberalism
- Knowledge River
- Optics Valley
- University of Arizona College of Optical Sciences
- University of Arizona Museum of Art
- University of Arizona Poetry Center
- USS Arizona salvaged artifacts
