= Dexter Lawson Jr. =

American gridiron football player (born 1999)

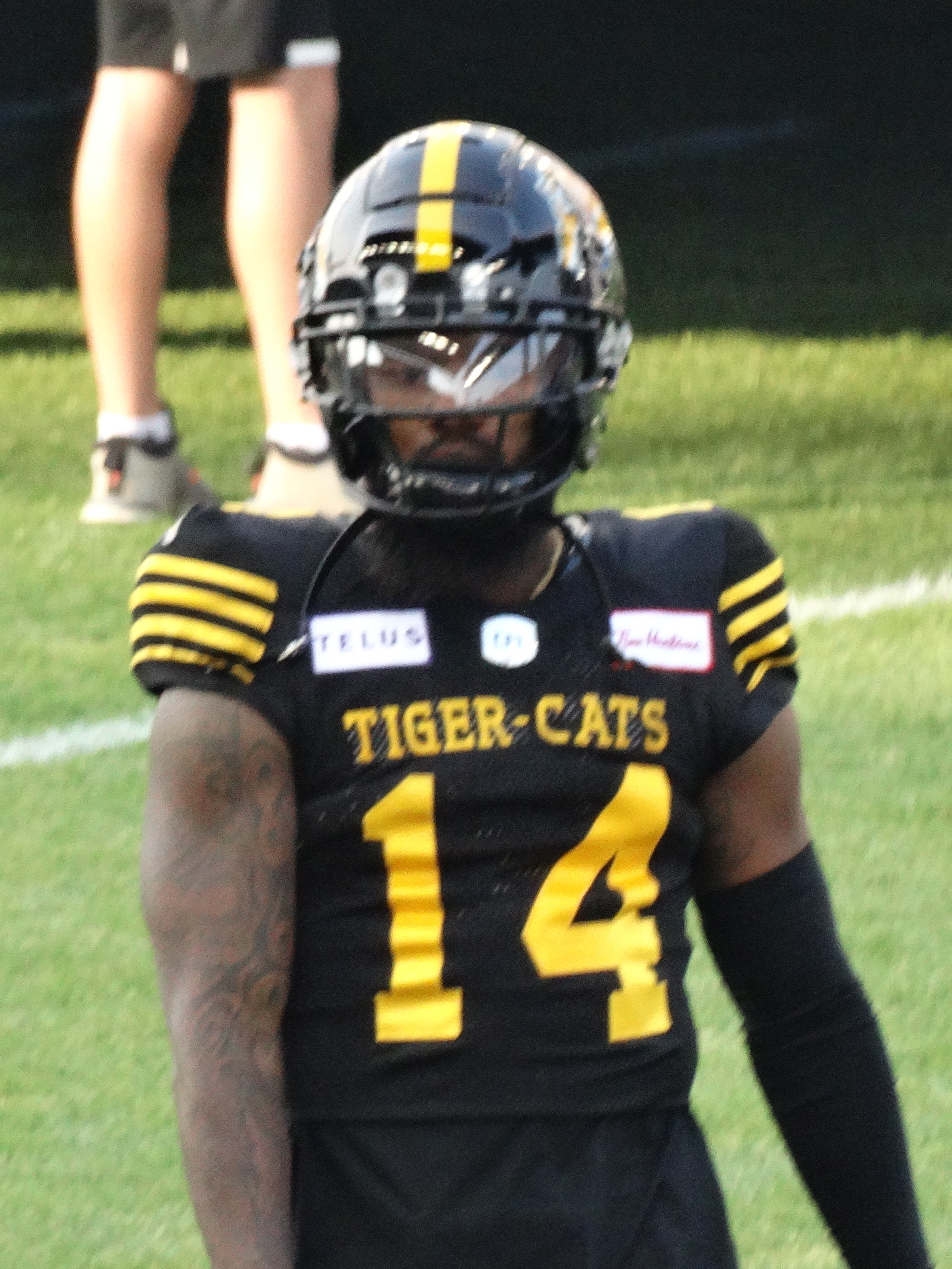
- Lawson with the Hamilton Tiger-Cats in 2023

No. 12 – Orlando Pirates
- Position: Defensive back
- Roster status: Active

Personal information
- Born: November 5, 1999 (age 27); Bloomfield, Connecticut, U.S.
- Listed height: 5 ft 10 in (1.78 m)
- Listed weight: 190 lb (86 kg)

Career information
- High school: St. Thomas More (Oakdale, CT)
- College: Central Connecticut; Appalachian State

Career history
- 2023–2024: Hamilton Tiger-Cats
- 2025: Winnipeg Blue Bombers*
- 2025: Massachusetts Pirates
- 2025: Winnipeg Blue Bombers
- 2026–present: Orlando Pirates
- * Offseason or practice squad member only

Awards and highlights
- Second-team All-NEC (2019)
- Stats at CFL.ca

Dexter Lawson Jr. (born November 5, 1999) is an American professional football defensive back for the Orlando Pirates of the Indoor Football League (IFL). He played college football at Central Connecticut and Appalachian State.

== Early life ==
Lawson played high school football at Bloomfield High School in Bloomfield, Connecticut and St. Thomas More High School in Oakdale, Connecticut.

== College career ==
=== Central Connecticut ===
Lawson played college football at Central Connecticut from 2018 to 2021. The 2020 season was cancelled to due the COVID-19 pandemic.

He played in ten games in 2018, recording 17 tackles and four pass breakups. He appeared in 13 games in 2019, totaling 31 tackles, one sack, one forced fumble, five pass breakups and a conference leading six interceptions, earning second team All-Northeast Conference and HERO Sports FCS Sophomore All-American honors. Lawson played in six games in 2021, accumulating 26 tackles and two interceptions.

=== Appalachian State ===
Dexter transferred to play college football at Appalachian State in 2022. He played in 12 games, starting 10, recording 26 tackles, three interceptions, five pass breakups and one forced fumble.

== Professional career ==
Lawson signed with the Hamilton Tiger-Cats of the Canadian Football League (CFL) on May 3, 2023. He was moved between the practice roster and active roster several times during the 2023 season. Overall, he dressed in nine games, starting eight, for the Tiger-Cats in 2023, totaling 29 tackles on defense, one special teams tackle and one interception.

In 2024, Lawson played and started in four games where he recorded 16 defensive tackles and one special teams tackle. He was then moved to the practice roster and then ultimately released on July 24, 2024.

Lawson joined the Winnipeg Blue Bombers in January 2025 but was released in June 2025 as part of final roster cuts ahead of the 2025 CFL season. Lawson then joined the Massachusetts Pirates of the Indoor Football League (IFL) in early July 2025, before being re-signed by the Blue Bombers to their practice squad in at the end of the month. Lawson became a free agent when his contract expired on February 10, 2026.

Lawson signed with the Orlando Pirates of the IFL on February 23, 2026.
