= Nick Jones (offensive lineman, born 2000) =

American gridiron football player (born 1985)

No. 66 – Orlando Pirates
- Position: Offensive lineman
- CFL status: American

Personal information
- Born: September 14, 2000 (age 26)
- Listed height: 6 ft 2 in (1.88 m)
- Listed weight: 300 lb (136 kg)

Career information
- High school: Byhalia (Byhalia, Mississippi)
- College: Mississippi State
- NFL draft: 2024: undrafted

Career history
- Saskatchewan Roughriders (2024–2025); Orlando Pirates (2026–present)

Awards and highlights
- Second-team MACJC All-North (2019)
- Stats at CFL.ca

Nicholas Oshawn Jones (born September 14, 2000) is an American professional football offensive lineman for the Orlando Pirates of the Indoor Football League (IFL). He played college football at Mississippi State. He has also played for the Saskatchewan Roughriders of the Canadian Football League (CFL).

== Early life ==
Nicholas Oshawn Jones was born on September 14, 2000. He played high school football at Byhalia High School in Byhalia, Mississippi. As a senior, he helped the team average 227.8 rushing yards per game.

== College career ==
Jones first played college football at East Mississippi Community College. He played in all ten games during the 2019 season. He helped the team average 457.4 yards of total offense per contest. Jones earned second-team Mississippi Association of Community and Junior Colleges All-North honors. He was rated the No. 9 junior college offensive tackle by 247Sports.com, and the No. 85 junior college player in the country. The 2020 football season at East Mississippi CC was cancelled due to the COVID-19 pandemic.

Jones originally committed to Southern Miss but switched to Mississippi State on September 5, 2020. He played in seven games, starting one, as a redshirt sophomore in 2021. He appeared in 13 games, starting 12, during the 2022 season. Jones started all 12 games for Mississippi State at left guard in 2023, allowing only three sacks in 657 snaps. He majored in interdisciplinary studies at Mississippi State.

== Professional career ==
=== Saskatchewan Roughriders ===
Jones went undrafted in the 2024 NFL draft. He was signed to the practice roster of the Saskatchewan Roughriders of the Canadian Football League on July 16, 2024. He was promoted to the active roster on August 7, moved to the practice roster on August 21, promoted to the active roster again on September 6, moved back to the practice roster again on September 27, promoted to the active roster for the third time on October 4, moved back to the practice roster for the fourth time on October 11, released on October 25, and signed to the practice roster for the fifth time on October 26. Jones dressed in five games, all starts, overall during the 2024 season. He re-signed with the Roughriders on November 25, 2024.

Jones was released by Saskatchewan on June 1, 2025. He was later signed to the practice roster on July 6. He was released again on September 26, 2025.

=== Orlando Pirates ===
Jones signed with the Orlando Pirates of the Indoor Football League (IFL) on February 22, 2026.
