= Leon O'Neal Jr. =

American football player (born 1998)

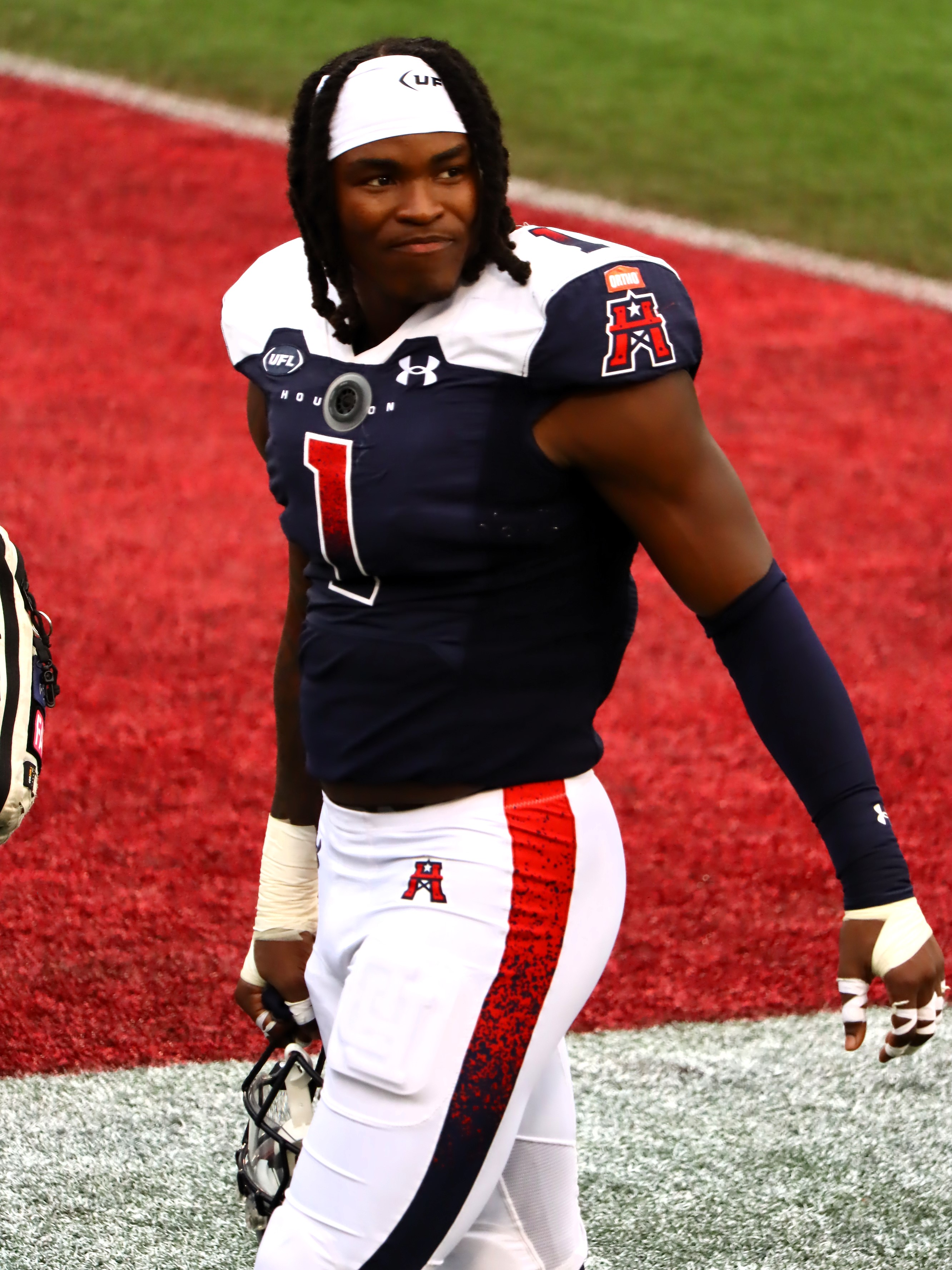
- O'Neal with the Houston Roughnecks in 2025

No. 20 – Orlando Pirates
- Position: Defensive back
- Roster status: Active

Personal information
- Born: December 23, 1998 (age 27); Cypress, Texas, U.S.
- Listed height: 6 ft 1 in (1.85 m)
- Listed weight: 204 lb (93 kg)

Career information
- High school: Cypress Springs
- College: Texas A&M (2018–2021)
- NFL draft: 2022: undrafted

Career history
- San Francisco 49ers (2022)*; Saskatchewan Roughriders (2023)*; Massachusetts Pirates (2023); Edmonton Elks (2024); Massachusetts Pirates (2025)*; Houston Roughnecks (2025); DC Defenders (2026)*; Columbus Aviators (2026); Orlando Pirates (2026–present)
- * Offseason or practice squad member only

Awards and highlights
- All-UFL Team (2025)
- Stats at CFL.ca

Leon O'Neal Jr. (born December 23, 1998) is an American professional football defensive back for the Orlando Pirates of the Indoor Football League (IFL). He played college football at Texas A&M. He has also been a member of the San Francisco 49ers of the National Football League (NFL), the Saskatchewan Roughriders and Edmonton Elks of the Canadian Football League (CFL), and the Houston Roughnecks, DC Defenders, and Columbus Aviators of the United Football League (UFL).

== Early life ==
O'Neal played high school football at Cypress Springs High School in Cypress, Texas. He recorded 78 tackles, five forced fumbles, and four pass breakups his senior year. He played in the U.S. Army All-American Bowl.

== College career ==
O'Neal played college football for the Texas A&M Aggies from 2018 to 2021. He played in all 13 games his freshman year in 2018, totaling 14 tackles, one interception and one pass breakup. He appeared in all 13 games, starting 10, in 2019, accumulating 41 tackles, one interception, and three pass breakups. O'Neal started all 10 games during the COVID-19 shortened 2020 season, recording 48 tackles, two interceptions, and three pass breakups. He started all 12 games during his senior season in 2021, totaling a career-high 58 tackles, one sack, five pass breakups, one fumble recovery, and two interceptions, one of which was returned 85 yards for a touchdown.

Overall, he recorded 161 tackles, one sack, six interceptions, 12 pass breakups, one fumble recovery, and one touchdown during his college career.

== Professional career ==
Pre-draft measurables
Height	Weight	Arm length	Hand span	Wingspan	40-yard dash	10-yard split	20-yard split	20-yard shuttle	Three-cone drill	Vertical jump	Broad jump	Bench press
6 ft 0 1/2 in (1.84 m)	204 lb (93 kg)	31 5/8 in (0.80 m)	10 1/4 in (0.26 m)	6 ft 4 5/8 in (1.95 m)	4.71 s	1.65 s	2.71 s	4.22 s	6.83 s	35.5 in (0.90 m)	10 ft 5 in (3.18 m)	15 reps
All values from NFL Combine/Pro Day

=== San Francisco 49ers ===
After going undrafted in the 2022 NFL draft, O'Neal signed with the San Francisco 49ers on May 13, 2022. He was waived/injured on August 10 and reverted to injured reserve the next day. O'Neal was waived from injured reserve on August 12.

=== Saskatchewan Roughriders ===
O'Neal was signed by the Saskatchewan Roughriders of the Canadian Football League (CFL) on February 13, 2023. He was released by Saskatchewan in a round of camp cuts on June 4.

=== Massachusetts Pirates ===
After being released by the Roughriders, O'Neal played for the Massachusetts Pirates of the Indoor Football League (IFL). On July 2, 2023, he entered the crowd to confront a fan. He was suspended indefinitely by the IFL the next day.

=== Edmonton Elks ===
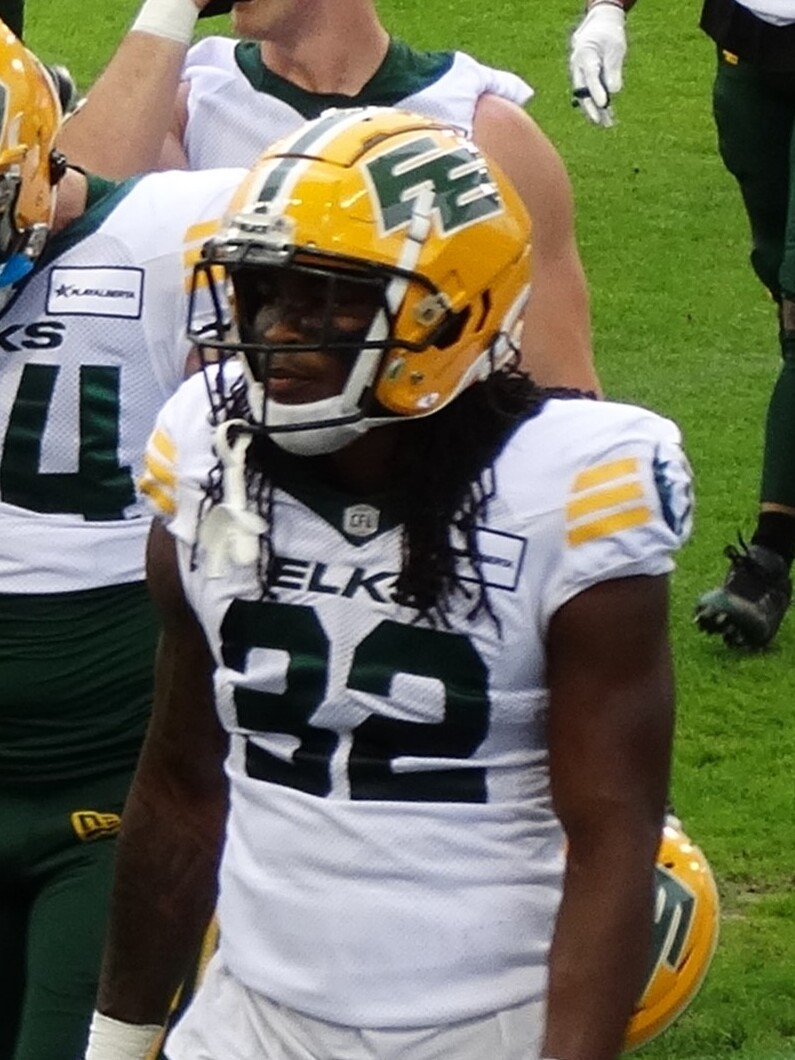
O'Neal with the Edmonton Elks in 2024

O'Neal signed with the Edmonton Elks of the CFL on January 17, 2024. He dressed in 11 games, starting five, for the Elks in 2024, posting 35 defensive tackles and seven special teams tackles. O'Neal was released by the Elks on September 23.

=== Massachusetts Pirates (second stint) ===
On November 8, 2024, O'Neal signed with the Massachusetts Pirates for the 2025 season.

=== Houston Roughnecks ===
On January 28, 2025, O'Neal signed with the Houston Roughnecks of the United Football League (UFL). O'Neal was named to the 2025 All-UFL Team.

=== DC Defenders ===
On January 13, 2026, O'Neal was selected by the DC Defenders in the 2026 UFL draft. He was released by the Defenders on March 19.

=== Columbus Aviators ===
On April 13, 2026, O'Neal signed with the Columbus Aviators. He was released by Columbus on May 12.

=== Orlando Pirates (third stint) ===
On May 17, 2026, O'Neal signed with the Orlando Pirates of the IFL.
