= Tyree Gillespie =

American football player (born 1998)

No. 4 – Orlando Pirates
- Position: Safety
- Roster status: Active

Personal information
- Born: September 5, 1998 (age 28); Ocala, Florida, U.S.
- Listed height: 6 ft 0 in (1.83 m)
- Listed weight: 202 lb (92 kg)

Career information
- High school: Vanguard (Ocala, Florida)
- College: Missouri (2017–2020)
- NFL draft: 2021: 4th round, 143rd overall pick

Career history
- Las Vegas Raiders (2021); Tennessee Titans (2022)*; Jacksonville Jaguars (2022); Houston Texans (2023)*; Kansas City Chiefs (2023); Michigan Panthers (2025); Orlando Pirates (2026–present)
- * Offseason or practice squad member only

Career NFL statistics as of 2023
- Total tackles: 8
- Stats at Pro Football Reference

Tyree Gillespie (born September 5, 1998) is an American professional football safety for the Orlando Pirates of the Indoor Football League (IFL). He played college football at Missouri and was selected by the Las Vegas Raiders in the fourth round of the 2021 NFL draft.

== Early life ==
Gillespie grew up in Ocala, Florida and attended Vanguard High School. He played safety and running back and returned punts for the Knights. As a senior, Gillespie had 40 tackles and two interceptions on defense and rushed for 555 yards and seven touchdowns with a 14.2 rushing averaged on offense. He committed to play college football at Missouri over offers from Iowa State, Marshall, New Mexico and Troy.

== College career ==
Gillespie played for the Missouri Tigers for four seasons. As a freshman, he played in seven games. He started the final eight games of his sophomore season and finished with 48 tackles. As a junior, Gillespie recorded 50 tackles, 4.0 tackles for loss, and one sack with seven pass breakups a forced fumble. He had 46 total tackles and four pass breakups in nine games in his senior season. While at Missouri, Gillespie was a member of the Omega Psi Phi fraternity.

== Professional career ==
Pre-draft measurables
Height	Weight	Arm length	Hand span	40-yard dash	10-yard split	20-yard split	20-yard shuttle	Three-cone drill	Vertical jump	Broad jump	Bench press
5 ft 11 3/4 in (1.82 m)	207 lb (94 kg)	31 1/4 in (0.79 m)	9 1/2 in (0.24 m)	4.42 s	1.60 s	2.46 s	4.39 s	7.06 s	35.5 in (0.90 m)	9 ft 0 in (2.74 m)	15 reps
All values from Pro Day

=== Las Vegas Raiders ===
Gillespie was selected by the Las Vegas Raiders in the fourth round, 143rd overall, of the 2021 NFL draft. On May 17, 2021, he signed his four-year rookie contract with the Raiders. He entered his rookie season as the backup strong safety and mostly played in special teams. He was placed on injured reserve on November 17, 2021. He was activated on December 25.

=== Tennessee Titans ===
On August 16, 2022, Gillespie was traded to the Tennessee Titans for a conditional 2024 seventh-round pick. He was waived on August 30.

=== Jacksonville Jaguars ===
On August 31, 2022, Gillespie was claimed off waivers by the Jacksonville Jaguars. He was waived on December 19, and re-signed to the practice squad. On February 9, 2023, Gillespie signed a reserve/future contract with the Jaguars. He was waived on May 1.

=== Houston Texans ===
On May 2, 2023, Gillespie was claimed off waivers by the Houston Texans. He was waived/injured on August 23, 2023. He was released on September 1.

=== Kansas City Chiefs ===
On December 5, 2023, Gillespie was signed to the Kansas City Chiefs practice squad. He was released on January 5, 2024. He was re-signed on February 22, 2024, then waived on May 4, but re-signed on July 22. He was waived/injured on August 27.

=== Michigan Panthers ===
On March 6, 2025, Gillespie signed with the Michigan Panthers of the United Football League (UFL).

=== Orlando Pirates ===
On May 18, 2026, Gillespie signed with the Orlando Pirates of the Indoor Football League (IFL).
