= Tyran Walker-Hunt =

American gridiron football player (born 1999)

- Walker-Hunt with the BC Lions in 2026

No. 67 – BC Lions
- Position: Offensive lineman
- Roster status: Active
- CFL status: American

Personal information
- Born: February 14, 1999 (age 27); Boykins, Virginia, U.S.
- Listed height: 6 ft 6 in (1.98 m)
- Listed weight: 310 lb (141 kg)

Career information
- High school: Southampton (Courtland, Virginia)
- College: Maryland (2017–2020); Old Dominion (2021–2022)
- NFL draft: 2023: undrafted

Career history
- Memphis Showboats (2023); Frisco Fighters (2024); San Antonio Brahmas (2025)*; BC Lions (2025–present)
- * Offseason or practice squad member only

Awards and highlights
- First-team All-IFL (2024); IFL All-Rookie Team (2024)
- Stats at CFL.ca

Tyran Walker-Hunt (born February 14, 1999) is an American professional football offensive lineman for the BC Lions of the Canadian Football League (CFL). He played college football for the Maryland Terrapins and Old Dominion Monarchs.

== Early life ==
Walker-Hunt was born on February 14, 1999, in Boykins, Virginia. He attended Southampton High School in Courtland, Virginia.

== College career ==
Walker-Hunt played college football for the Maryland Terrapins from 2017 to 2020 and Old Dominion Monarchs from 2021 to 2022. At Maryland, he played in eight games as a reserve lineman. Walker-Hunt then transferred to Old Dominion, where he played in 24 games, starting in 22, at left guard.

== Professional career ==
Pre-draft measurables
Height	Weight	Arm length	Hand span	Wingspan	40-yard dash	10-yard split	20-yard split	20-yard shuttle	Three-cone drill	Vertical jump	Broad jump	Bench press
6 ft 6 in (1.98 m)	308 lb (140 kg)	32 7/8 in (0.84 m)	10 in (0.25 m)	6 ft 8 3/4 in (2.05 m)	5.04 s	1.76 s	2.84 s	5.00 s	7.67 s	28.5 in (0.72 m)	8 ft 11 in (2.72 m)	20 reps
All values from Pro day

=== Memphis Showboats ===
On May 23, 2023, Walker-Hunt signed with the Memphis Showboats of the United States Football League (USFL). He played and started in three games. On March 10, 2024, Walker-Hunt was released.

=== Frisco Fighters ===
In 2024, Walker-Hunt played for the Frisco Fighters of the Indoor Football League (IFL). He played in 12 games, earning IFL All-Rookie and first-team All-IFL honors.

=== San Antonio Brahmas ===
On September 23, 2024, Walker-Hunt was signed by the San Antonio Brahmas of the United Football League (UFL). On March 20, 2025, he was released by the team.

=== BC Lions ===
On March 31, 2025, Walker-Hunt signed with the BC Lions of the Canadian Football League (CFL). On June 1, 2025, Walker-Hunt was signed to the Lions' practice roster, where he spent the entire 2025 CFL season. On November 21, 2025, Walker-Hunt re-signed with the Lions on a future/active contract. On May 31, 2026, Walker-Hunt reassigned to the Lions' practice roster. He was released on July 16, 2026.

On July 27, 2026, Walker-Hunt was re-signed by the Lions. On July 29, 2026, Walker-Hunt was promoted to the Lions' active roster.
