= 2024 Indoor Football League season =

2024 IFL season
- League: Indoor Football League
- Sport: Indoor football
- Duration: March 16 – July 21
- Teams: 16
- TV partners: Broadcast; CBS Sports; Live streaming; YouTube
- Eastern Conference champions: Massachusetts Pirates
- Eastern Conference runners-up: Green Bay Blizzard
- Western Conference champions: Arizona Rattlers
- Western Conference runners-up: San Diego Strike Force
- Finals champions: Arizona Rattlers
- Runners-up: Massachusetts Pirates

IFL seasons
- ← 2023 2025 →

The 2024 Indoor Football League season was the sixteenth season of the Indoor Football League (IFL). It is also the second year it functions as a de facto minor league of the UFL, having originally started as a partnership with the XFL.

== Offseason ==
=== IFL to XFL ===
During the 2023 XFL draft, reigning IFL Most Valuable Player, T. J. Edwards, was selected by the San Antonio Brahmas and IFL Defensive Rookie of the Year, Kordell Jackson, was drafted by the Orlando Guardians.

=== Expansion ===
On August 20, 2023, the league announced they would be adding the three-time, and defending, National Arena League champions in the Jacksonville Sharks as their 15th franchise. On September 26, the league added the San Antonio Gunslingers as their 16th franchise to even out the conferences. The Bismarck Bucks, which last played in the 2022 season, delayed their return to 2025.

=== Relocation ===
On November 6, 2023, the Arizona Rattlers announced their move to Desert Diamond Arena in Glendale, Arizona and the Massachusetts Pirates announced that they had signed a multi-year lease with the Tsongas Center at the University of Massachusetts Lowell, beginning with this season.

=== Music ===
Beginning this season, the Indoor Football League has a theme song for all games – "The Indoor War" by Sioux Falls-based musician Denham. The song was released on March 10, 2024.

== Teams ==
Team	Location	Arena	Capacity	Founded	Joined	Head coach
Eastern Conference
Frisco Fighters	Frisco, TX	Comerica Center	3,500	2019	2020	Andre Coles
Green Bay Blizzard	Ashwaubenon, WI	Resch Center	8,600	2003	2010	Corey Roberson
Iowa Barnstormers	Des Moines, IA	Wells Fargo Arena	15,181	1995	2015	Dave Mogensen
Jacksonville Sharks	Jacksonville, FL	VV Memorial Arena	13,011	2009	2024	Jason Gibson
Massachusetts Pirates	Lowell, MA	Tsongas Center	6,003	2017	2021	Mark Stoute
Quad City Steamwheelers	Moline, IL	Vibrant Arena	9,200	2017	2019	Cory Ross
Sioux Falls Storm	Sioux Falls, SD	DS Premier Center	10,678	2000	2009	Kurtiss Riggs
Tulsa Oilers	Tulsa, OK	BOK Center	16,582	2022	2023	Marvin Jones
Western Conference
Arizona Rattlers	Glendale, AZ	Desert Diamond Arena	19,000	1992	2017	Kevin Guy
Bay Area Panthers	San Jose, CA	SAP Center	17,562	2019	2020	Rob Keefe
Duke City Gladiators	Rio Rancho, NM	RR Events Center	6,000	2015	2020	Sherman Carter
Northern Arizona Wranglers	Prescott Valley, AZ	Findlay Toyota Center	6,000	2020	2021	Les Moss
San Antonio Gunslingers	San Antonio, TX	Freeman Coliseum	9,800	2020	2024	Tom Menas
San Diego Strike Force	San Diego, CA	Pechanga Arena	12,000	2018	2019	Taylor Genuser
Tucson Sugar Skulls	Tucson, AZ	Tucson Arena	8,962	2018	2019	Billy Back
Vegas Knight Hawks	Henderson, NV	Lee's Family Forum	6,019	2021	2022	Mike Davis

== Final regular season standings ==
Eastern Conference
Team	W	L	PCT	GB	CONF	PF	PA	STK
^{(1)}Green Bay Blizzard (Note: Bay Area finished ahead of Green Bay for the top overall seed based on strength-of-schedule. Conference tiebreaker was used to eliminate Frisco. (see below)) (Note: Green Bay finished ahead of Frisco based on the conference tiebreaker.)	13	3	.813	–	13–3	736	529	W3
^{(2)}Frisco Fighters	13	3	.813	–	7–2	847	704	W5
^{(3)}Massachusetts Pirates (Note: Massachusetts finished ahead of Quad City based on the conference tiebreaker.)	8	8	.500	5	8–5	663	635	L2
^{(4)}Quad City Steamwheelers	8	8	.500	5	8–8	686	734	L1
Tulsa Oilers	6	10	.375	7	6–8	638	680	W1
Jacksonville Sharks (Note: Jacksonville finished ahead of Iowa based on the conference tiebreaker.)	5	11	.313	8	5–6	601	757	W1
Iowa Barnstormers	5	11	.313	8	5–9	660	779	L1
Sioux Falls Storm	3	13	.188	10	2–13	661	764	L6

Western Conference
Team	W	L	PCT	GB	CONF	PF	PA	STK
^{(1)}Bay Area Panthers	13	3	.813	–	12–3	665	563	W2
^{(2)}Vegas Knight Hawks (Note: Vegas finished ahead of Arizona based on the conference tiebreaker.)	11	5	.688	2	9–4	830	680	W2
^{(3)}Arizona Rattlers	11	5	.688	2	7–5	784	710	W3
^{(4)}San Diego Strike Force	10	6	.625	3	9–5	710	649	L1
Northern Arizona Wranglers	9	7	.563	4	8–7	770	792	L2
San Antonio Gunslingers	8	8	.500	5	4–6	830	847	L1
Duke City Gladiators	3	13	.188	10	3–11	625	740	W1
Tucson Sugar Skulls	2	14	.125	11	2–13	565	723	L9

Legend
^{(1)}clinched home field advantage throughout IFL playoffs
^{(1)}clinched home field advantage throughout conference playoffs
^{(z)}clinched indicated seed
Notes (Note: The procedure used to determine tiebreakers is: 1) Conference record 2) Head-to-head record, 3) Strength of schedule, 4) Head-to-head point differential, and 5) Overall point differential) (Note: When determining which team is the designated home team for the IFL Championship, overall record and conference tiebreakers come first, followed by the above tiebreakers starting from head-to-head.)

== Season schedule ==
=== Regular season ===
==== Week 1 ====
Date	Time	Away team	Result		Home team	Stadium	Notes	Ref
March 16	8:05 p.m. CT	Arizona Rattlers	51	40	Northern Arizona Wranglers	Findlay Toyota Center		
March 17	3:05 p.m. CT	Massachusetts Pirates	44	40	Green Bay Blizzard	Resch Center		

==== Week 2 ====
Date	Time	Away team	Result		Home team	Stadium	Notes	Ref
March 22	7:05 p.m. CT	Sioux Falls Storm	32	38	Quad City Steamwheelers	Vibrant Arena	Overtime result	
March 22	7:30 p.m. CT	Tulsa Oilers	25	31	Frisco Fighters	Comerica Center	Overtime result	
March 23	6:05 p.m. CT	Iowa Barnstormers	24	35	Green Bay Blizzard	Resch Center		
March 23	6:05 p.m. CT	Jacksonville Sharks	21	26	Massachusetts Pirates	Tsongas Center		
March 24	5:05 p.m. CT	Vegas Knight Hawks	45	43	Arizona Rattlers	Desert Diamond Arena		
March 25	7:05 p.m. CT	San Diego Strike Force	32	26	Duke City Gladiators	RR Events Center		

==== Week 3 ====
Date	Time	Away team	Result		Home team	Stadium	Notes	Ref
March 29	6:05 p.m. CT	Sioux Falls Storm	41	49	Massachusetts Pirates	Tsongas Center		
March 29	7:30 p.m. CT	Duke City Gladiators	40	49	Frisco Fighters	Comerica Center		
March 30	8:05 p.m. CT	Tucson Sugar Skulls	48	54	Northern Arizona Wranglers	Findlay Toyota Center		
March 31	5:05 p.m. CT	Arizona Rattlers	41	47	Bay Area Panthers	SAP Center		
March 31	5:05 p.m. CT	Jacksonville Sharks	33	39	Vegas Knight Hawks	Dollar Loan Center		
April 1	8:05 p.m. CT	San Antonio Gunslingers	61	69	San Diego Strike Force	Pechanga Arena		

==== Week 4 ====
Date	Time	Away team	Result		Home team	Stadium	Notes	Ref
April 6	6:05 p.m. CT	Northern Arizona Wranglers	57	50	San Antonio Gunslingers	Freeman Coliseum		
April 6	6:05 p.m. CT	Bay Area Panthers	48	24	Jacksonville Sharks	VV Memorial Arena		
April 6	7:05 p.m. CT	Tucson Sugar Skulls	56	49	Duke City Gladiators	RR Events Center		
April 6	7:05 p.m. CT	Green Bay Blizzard	32	24	Quad City Steamwheelers	Vibrant Arena		
April 6	7:05 p.m. CT	Iowa Barnstormers	31	39	Tulsa Oilers	BOK Center		

==== Week 5 ====
Date	Time	Away team	Result		Home team	Stadium	Notes	Ref
April 12	6:05 p.m. CT	Iowa Barnstormers	29	54	Massachusetts Pirates	Tsongas Center		
April 12	9:05 p.m. CT	San Antonio Gunslingers	44	66	Vegas Knight Hawks	Lee's Family Forum		
April 13	7:05 p.m. CT	Quad City Steamwheelers	37	54	Frisco Fighters	Comerica Center		
April 14	3:05 p.m. CT	Tulsa Oilers	56	40	Sioux Falls Storm	DS Premier Center		
April 14	5:05 p.m. CT	San Diego Strike Force	55	45	Arizona Rattlers	Desert Diamond Arena		
April 14	5:05 p.m. CT	Bay Area Panthers	44	31	Tucson Sugar Skulls	Tucson Arena		

==== Week 6 ====
Date	Time	Away team	Result		Home team	Stadium	Notes	Ref
April 18	6:30 p.m. CT	Tucson Sugar Skulls	36	60	San Antonio Gunslingers	Freeman Coliseum		
April 19	6:05 p.m. CT	Sioux Falls Storm	35	48	Green Bay Blizzard	Resch Center		
April 20	6:05 p.m. CT	Vegas Knight Hawks	61	35	Jacksonville Sharks	VV Memorial Arena		
April 20	7:05 p.m. CT	Massachusetts Pirates	43	54	Quad City Steamwheelers	Vibrant Arena		
April 20	7:05 p.m. CT	Arizona Rattlers	49	47	Iowa Barnstormers	Wells Fargo Arena		
April 20	7:05 p.m. CT	Frisco Fighters	60	33	Tulsa Oilers	BOK Center		
April 20	8:05 p.m. CT	San Diego Strike Force	50	53	Bay Area Panthers	SAP Center		
April 20	8:05 p.m. CT	Duke City Gladiators	23	39	Northern Arizona Wranglers	Findlay Toyota Center		

==== Week 7 ====
Date	Time	Away team	Result		Home team	Stadium	Notes	Ref
April 26	6:05 p.m. CT	Iowa Barnstormers	33	40	Green Bay Blizzard	Resch Center		
April 26	7:30 p.m. CT	San Antonio Gunslingers	54	52	Frisco Fighters	Comerica Center		
April 27	6:05 p.m. CT	Massachusetts Pirates	43	38	Sioux Falls Storm	DS Premier Center		
April 27	8:05 p.m. CT	Duke City Gladiators	27	42	Vegas Knight Hawks	Lee's Family Forum		
April 27	8:05 p.m. CT	Northern Arizona Wranglers	34	31	Tucson Sugar Skulls	Tucson Arena		
April 28	3:05 p.m. CT	Tulsa Oilers	72	59	Quad City Steamwheelers	Vibrant Arena		
April 28	5:05 p.m. CT	Bay Area Panthers	33	32	San Diego Strike Force	Pechanga Arena		
April 28	5:05 p.m. CT	Jacksonville Sharks	35	55	Arizona Rattlers	Desert Diamond Arena		

==== Week 8 ====
Date	Time	Away team	Result		Home team	Stadium	Notes	Ref
May 3	7:05 p.m. CT	Green Bay Blizzard	38	46	Sioux Falls Storm	DS Premier Center		
May 3	7:05 p.m. CT	Jacksonville Sharks	47	44	Tulsa Oilers	BOK Center		
May 4	6:05 p.m. CT	Frisco Fighters	62	57	San Antonio Gunslingers	Freeman Coliseum		
May 4	7:05 p.m. CT	Quad City Steamwheelers	53	55	Iowa Barnstormers	Wells Fargo Arena		
May 4	8:05 p.m. CT	Vegas Knight Hawks	62	43	Bay Area Panthers	SAP Center		
May 5	5:05 p.m. CT	Northern Arizona Wranglers	45	54	San Diego Strike Force	Pechanga Arena		

==== Week 9 ====
Date	Time	Away team	Result		Home team	Stadium	Notes	Ref
May 10	7:05 p.m. CT	Quad City Steamwheelers	56	49	Sioux Falls Storm	DS Premier Center		
May 10	9:05 p.m. CT	San Diego Strike Force	64	68	Vegas Knight Hawks	Lee's Family Forum		
May 11	1:05 p.m. CT	Jacksonville Sharks	33	68	Frisco Fighters	Comerica Center		
May 11	3:05 p.m. CT	Tulsa Oilers	22	42	Green Bay Blizzard	Resch Center		
May 11	7:05 p.m. CT	Massachusetts Pirates	34	42	Iowa Barnstormers	Wells Fargo Arena		
May 11	7:05 p.m. CT	San Antonio Gunslingers	56	53	Duke City Gladiators	RR Events Center		
May 11	8:05 p.m. CT	Bay Area Panthers	39	36	Northern Arizona Wranglers	Findlay Toyota Center		
May 11	8:05 p.m. CT	Arizona Rattlers	38	32	Tucson Sugar Skulls	Tucson Arena		

==== Week 10 ====
Date	Time	Away team	Result		Home team	Stadium	Notes	Ref
May 17	7:05 p.m. CT	Iowa Barnstormers	55	57	Quad City Steamwheelers	Vibrant Arena		
May 18	1:05 p.m. CT	Northern Arizona Wranglers	41	40	Massachusetts Pirates	Tsongas Center		
May 18	3:05 p.m. CT	Frisco Fighters	38	67	Green Bay Blizzard	Resch Center		
May 18	6:05 p.m. CT	Tulsa Oilers	43	54	San Antonio Gunslingers	Freeman Coliseum		
May 18	7:05 p.m. CT	Sioux Falls Storm	52	42	Jacksonville Sharks	VV Memorial Arena		
May 18	8:05 p.m. CT	Bay Area Panthers	68	52	Arizona Rattlers	Desert Diamond Arena		
May 18	8:05 p.m. CT	Vegas Knight Hawks	50	51	Tucson Sugar Skulls	Tucson Arena	Overtime result	
May 19	5:05 p.m. CT	Duke City Gladiators	21	47	San Diego Strike Force	Pechanga Arena		

==== Week 11 ====
Date	Time	Away team	Result		Home team	Stadium	Notes	Ref
May 24	7:05 p.m. CT	Green Bay Blizzard	54	40	Iowa Barnstormers	Wells Fargo Arena		
May 25	6:05 p.m. CT	Tulsa Oilers	22	23	Massachusetts Pirates	Tsongas Center		
May 25	8:05 p.m. CT	Duke City Gladiators	53	55	Arizona Rattlers	Desert Diamond Arena		
May 25	8:05 p.m. CT	San Antonio Gunslingers	31	42	Bay Area Panthers	SAP Center		
May 25	8:05 p.m. CT	Tucson Sugar Skulls	53	60	Northern Arizona Wranglers	Findlay Toyota Center		
May 26	5:05 p.m. CT	Frisco Fighters	44	41	San Diego Strike Force	Pechanga Arena		

==== Week 12 ====
Date	Time	Away team	Result		Home team	Stadium	Notes	Ref
May 31	7:05 p.m. CT	Quad City Steamwheelers	36	64	Green Bay Blizzard	Resch Center		
June 1	6:05 p.m. CT	Arizona Rattlers	62	41	Jacksonville Sharks	VV Memorial Arena		
June 1	7:05 p.m. CT	Iowa Barnstormers	47	45	Sioux Falls Storm	DS Premier Center		
June 1	7:05 p.m. CT	Massachusetts Pirates	48	52	Frisco Fighters	Comerica Center		
June 1	7:05 p.m. CT	San Diego Strike Force	42	34	Tulsa Oilers	BOK Center		
June 1	8:05 p.m. CT	Northern Arizona Wranglers	58	52	Vegas Knight Hawks	Lee's Family Forum		
June 1	8:05 p.m. CT	Duke City Gladiators	21	20	Tucson Sugar Skulls	Tucson Arena		

==== Week 13 ====
Date	Time	Away team	Result		Home team	Stadium	Notes	Ref
June 8	12:05 p.m. CT	Green Bay Blizzard	36	33	Massachusetts Pirates	Tsongas Center		
June 8	6:05 p.m. CT	Tulsa Oilers	42	45	Jacksonville Sharks	VV Memorial Arena		
June 8	6:05 p.m. CT	Duke City Gladiators	45	46	San Antonio Gunslingers	Freeman Coliseum		
June 8	7:05 p.m. CT	Frisco Fighters	49	52	Quad City Steamwheelers	Vibrant Arena		
June 8	7:05 p.m. CT	Vegas Knight Hawks	40	46	Sioux Falls Storm	DS Premier Center	Overtime result	
June 8	8:05 p.m. CT	Arizona Rattlers	47	46	San Diego Strike Force	Pechanga Arena		
June 8	8:05 p.m. CT	Tucson Sugar Skulls	12	51	Bay Area Panthers	SAP Center		

==== Week 14 ====
Date	Time	Away team	Result		Home team	Stadium	Notes	Ref
June 14	7:05 p.m. CT	Jacksonville Sharks	35	63	Green Bay Blizzard	Resch Center		
June 15	6:05 p.m. CT	San Antonio Gunslingers	52	51	Massachusetts Pirates	Tsongas Center		
June 15	7:05 p.m. CT	Quad City Steamwheelers	27	28	Iowa Barnstormers	Wells Fargo Arena		
June 15	7:05 p.m. CT	Vegas Knight Hawks	53	39	Duke City Gladiators	RR Events Center		
June 15	7:05 p.m. CT	Sioux Falls Storm	41	55	Tulsa Oilers	BOK Center		
June 15	8:05 p.m. CT	Frisco Fighters	35	18	Tucson Sugar Skulls	Tucson Arena		
June 15	8:05 p.m. CT	Northern Arizona Wranglers	49	56	Arizona Rattlers	Desert Diamond Arena		
June 16	5:05 p.m. CT	San Diego Strike Force	43	42	Bay Area Panthers	SAP Center		

==== Week 15 ====
Date	Time	Away team	Result		Home team	Stadium	Notes	Ref
June 22	6:05 p.m. CT	Massachusetts Pirates	44	30	Jacksonville Sharks	VV Memorial Arena		
June 22	7:05 p.m. CT	Tulsa Oilers	54	48	Iowa Barnstormers	Wells Fargo Arena		
June 22	7:05 p.m. CT	Green Bay Blizzard	27	37	Quad City Steamwheelers	Vibrant Arena		
June 22	7:05 p.m. CT	Bay Area Panthers	34	32	Duke City Gladiators	RR Events Center		
June 22	7:05 p.m. CT	Sioux Falls Storm	40	55	Frisco Fighters	Comerica Center		
June 22	8:05 p.m. CT	Arizona Rattlers	50	55	Vegas Knight Hawks	Lee's Family Forum		
June 22	8:05 p.m. CT	San Diego Strike Force	41	40	Tucson Sugar Skulls	Tucson Arena		
June 23	5:05 p.m. CT	San Antonio Gunslingers	68	74	Northern Arizona Wranglers	Findlay Toyota Center		

==== Week 16 ====
Date	Time	Away team	Result		Home team	Stadium	Notes	Ref
June 29	6:05 p.m. CT	Frisco Fighters	58	57	San Antonio Gunslingers	Freeman Coliseum		
June 29	7:05 p.m. CT	Tucson Sugar Skulls	32	44	Duke City Gladiators	RR Events Center		
June 29	7:05 p.m. CT	Jacksonville Sharks	36	28	Sioux Falls Storm	DS Premier Center		
June 29	7:05 p.m. CT	Green Bay Blizzard	54	20	Tulsa Oilers	BOK Center		
June 29	8:05 p.m. CT	Bay Area Panthers	37	35	Vegas Knight Hawks	Lee's Family Forum		
June 29	8:05 p.m. CT	San Diego Strike Force	57	43	Northern Arizona Wranglers	Findlay Toyota Center		
June 29	8:05 p.m. CT	Iowa Barnstormers	26	55	Arizona Rattlers	Desert Diamond Arena		
July 1	6:05 p.m. CT	Quad City Steamwheelers	35	52	Massachusetts Pirates	Tsongas Center		

==== Week 17 ====
Date	Time	Away team	Result		Home team	Stadium	Notes	Ref
July 6	6:05 p.m. CT	Massachusetts Pirates	55	58	San Antonio Gunslingers	Freeman Coliseum		
July 6	7:05 p.m. CT	Jacksonville Sharks	69	43	Iowa Barnstormers	Wells Fargo Arena		
July 6	7:05 p.m. CT	Sioux Falls Storm	44	45	Quad City Steamwheelers	Vibrant Arena	Overtime result	
July 6	8:05 p.m. CT	Vegas Knight Hawks	59	60	San Diego Strike Force	Pechanga Arena		
July 7	4:05 p.m. CT	Frisco Fighters	81	55	Duke City Gladiators	RR Events Center		
July 7	5:05 p.m. CT	Northern Arizona Wranglers	47	46	Bay Area Panthers	SAP Center		
July 7	5:05 p.m. CT	Tucson Sugar Skulls	37	44	Arizona Rattlers	Desert Diamond Arena		

==== Week 18 ====
Date	Time	Away team	Result		Home team	Stadium	Notes	Ref
July 13	6:05 p.m. CT	Green Bay Blizzard	45	42	Jacksonville Sharks	VV Memorial Arena		
July 13	7:05 p.m. CT	Sioux Falls Storm	54	65	Iowa Barnstormers	Wells Fargo Arena		
July 13	7:05 p.m. CT	Quad City Steamwheelers	39	35	Tulsa Oilers	BOK Center		
July 13	8:05 p.m. CT	San Antonio Gunslingers	49	43	Tucson Sugar Skulls	Tucson Arena		
July 13	8:05 p.m. CT	Vegas Knight Hawks	55	45	Northern Arizona Wranglers	Findlay Toyota Center		
July 13	8:05 p.m. CT	Duke City Gladiators	28	50	Bay Area Panthers	SAP Center		

==== Week 19 ====
Date	Time	Away team	Result		Home team	Stadium	Notes	Ref
July 19	7:05 p.m. CT	Massachusetts Pirates	24	44	Tulsa Oilers	BOK Center		
July 20	6:05 p.m. CT	Quad City Steamwheelers	37	43	Jacksonville Sharks	VV Memorial Arena		
July 20	6:05 p.m. CT	Arizona Rattlers	41	34	San Antonio Gunslingers	Freeman Coliseum		
July 20	7:05 p.m. CT	Green Bay Blizzard	51	30	Sioux Falls Storm	DS Premier Center		
July 20	7:05 p.m. CT	Iowa Barnstormers	47	59	Frisco Fighters	Comerica Center		
July 20	8:05 p.m. CT	Bay Area Panthers	30	20	San Diego Strike Force	Pechanga Arena		
July 20	8:05 p.m. CT	Tucson Sugar Skulls	25	49	Vegas Knight Hawks	Lee's Family Forum		
July 21	4:05 p.m. CT	Northern Arizona Wranglers	48	69	Duke City Gladiators	RR Events Center		

=== Postseason ===
First round
July 28 – SAP Center
W1 Bay Area Panthers	40
W4 San Diego Strike Force	49
July 27 – Lee's Family Forum
W2 Vegas Knight Hawks	38
W3 Arizona Rattlers	39
July 26 – Resch Center
E1 Green Bay Blizzard	34
E4 Quad City Steamwheelers	23
July 27 – Comerica Center
E2 Frisco Fighters	50
E3 Massachusetts Pirates	53

Second round
August 5 – Desert Diamond Arena
W4 San Diego Strike Force	23
W3 Arizona Rattlers	58
August 2 – Resch Center
E1 Green Bay Blizzard	28
E3 Massachusetts Pirates	51

National Championship
August 17 – Lee's Family Forum
W3 Arizona Rattlers	53
E3 Massachusetts Pirates	16

==== Round One ====
Date	Time	Away team	Result		Home team	Stadium	Notes	Ref
July 26	7:05 p.m. CT	Quad City Steamwheelers	23	34	Green Bay Blizzard	Resch Center		
July 27	6:05 p.m. CT	Massachusetts Pirates	53	50	Frisco Fighters	Comerica Center		
July 27	9:05 p.m. CT	Arizona Rattlers	39	38	Vegas Knight Hawks	Lee's Family Forum		
July 28	6:05 p.m. CT	San Diego Strike Force	49	40	Bay Area Panthers	SAP Center		

==== Conference Championships ====
Date	Time	Away team	Result		Home team	Stadium	Notes	Ref
August 2	7:05 p.m. CT	Massachusetts Pirates	51	28	Green Bay Blizzard	Resch Center		
August 5	9:05 p.m. CT	San Diego Strike Force	23	58	Arizona Rattlers	Desert Diamond Arena		

==== IFL National Championship ====
2024 Dollar Loan Center IFL National Championship–Game summary

Quarter	1	2	3	4	Total
Massachusetts Pirates	0	0	8	8	16
Arizona Rattlers	8	21	10	14	53

at Lee's Family Forum, Henderson, Nevada

- Date: August 17, 2024
- Game time: 1:05 p.m. PDT
- Referee: Abram Anaya
- TV: CBS Sports Network
- Game Book

Game information

First quarter

- ARI – Jamal Miles 9-yard pass from Dalton Sneed (Dawson Evitts Two-point drop-kick), 6:47. Rattlers 8–0. Drive: 5 plays, 48 yards, 3:18.

Second quarter

- ARI – Shannon Brooks 6-yard run (Dawson Evitts kick), 12:38. 'Rattlers 15–0. Drive: 5 plays, 45 yards, 3:13.
- ARI – Dalton Sneed 10-yard run (Dawson Evitts kick), 3:20. 'Rattlers 22–0. Drive: 3 plays, 43 yards, 1:15.
- ARI – Shannon Brooks 1-yard run (Dawson Evitts kick), :10. 'Rattlers 29–0. Drive: 5 plays, 43 yards, :44.

Third quarter

- ARI – Dawson Evitts 23-yard field goal, 9:15. 'Rattlers 32–0. Drive: 8 plays, 22 yards, 5:45.
- MAS – Jimmie Robinson 3-yard run (Henry Nell Two-point drop-kick), 8:30 'Rattlers 32–8. Drive: 2 plays, 35 yards, :45.
- ARI – Jamal Miles 2-yard pass from Dalton Sneed (Dawson Evitts kick), 4:45. Rattlers 39–8. Drive: 5 plays, 25 yards, 2:59.

Fourth quarter

- ARI – Shannon Brooks 12-yard run (Dawson Evitts kick), 9:23. 'Rattlers 46–8. Drive: 4 plays, 45 yards, 2:24.
- ARI – Garrett Kettle 14-yard run (Dawson Evitts kick), 5:40. 'Rattlers 53–8. Drive: 1 plays, 14 yards, :25.
- MAS – Teo Redding 12-yard pass from Alejandro Bennifield (Henry Nell Two-point drop-kick), 4:20. 'Rattlers 53–16. Drive: 1 plays, 12 yards, :40.

Top passers

- ARI – Dalton Sneed – 10/15, 67 yards, 2 TDS
- MAS – Alejandro Bennifield – 11/30, 127 yards, TD, 3 INTS

Top rushers

- ARI – Shannon Brooks – 13 rushes, 69 yards, 3 TDS
- MAS – Jimmie Robinson – 10 rushes, 41 yards, TD

Top receivers

- ARI – Corey Reed Jr. – 3 receptions, 22 yards
- MAS – Teo Redding – 5 receptions, 41 yards, TD

== Awards ==
=== Players of the Week ===
Week	Offensive Player of the Week	Defensive Player of the Week	Special Teams Player of the Week
1	Alejandro Bennifield QB (Massachusetts)	Matt Elam CB (Massachusetts)	Arsiah McCorker WR (Northern Arizona)
2	Ja'Rome Johnson QB (Vegas)	Kishawn Walker CB (San Diego)	Jalyn Cagle RB (Green Bay)
3	Nate Davis QB (San Diego)	Norris Wreen CB (Frisco)	Ernesto Lacayo K (Duke City)
4	Mylik Mitchell QB (Tucson)	Romon Morris CB (Tulsa)	Ernesto Lacayo K (Duke City)
5	Ja'Rome Johnson QB (Vegas)	Justic'e King CB (San Diego)	Michael Hall K (Tulsa)
6	Sam Castronova QB (San Antonio)	Antwon Kincade LB (Bay Area)	TC Stevens K (San Antonio)
7	Daniel Smith QB (Tulsa)	Makel Calhoun LB (Vegas)	DJ Stubbs WR (Jacksonville)
8	Fred Payton Jr. QB (Jacksonville)	Claude Davis DL (Sioux Falls)	Gabriel Rui K (Iowa)
9	Sam Castronova QB (San Antonio)	Ian McBorrough LB (Iowa)	Jarrod Harrington WR (Quad City)
10	Sam Castronova QB (San Antonio)	Laronji Vason-McCoy DB (Sioux Falls)	Kyle Kaplan K (Quad City)
11	Joshua Jones QB (Northern Arizona)	Antwon Kincade LB (Bay Area)	Gabriel Rui K (Iowa)
12	Dalton Sneed QB (Arizona)	Julius Wilkerson LB (Green Bay)	Quian Williams WR (Iowa)
13	Sam Castronova QB (San Antonio)	Ravarius Rivers DB (Green Bay)	Andrew Mevis K (Green Bay)
14	Sam Castronova QB (San Antonio)	Makel Calhoun LB (Vegas)	Elijah Lilly WR (San Diego)
15	Joshua Jones QB (Northern Arizona)	Tyrell Pearson DB (Frisco)	Tramond Lofton DL (Northern Arizona)
16	Arthur Jackson III WR (San Diego)	Dillion Winfrey DB (Arizona)	Ernesto Lacayo K (Duke City)
17	T.J. Edwards QB (Frisco)	Elijah Belle DB (San Diego)	Axel Perez K (Northern Arizona)
18	Ja'Rome Johnson QB (Vegas)	Rafiq Abdul-Wahid DL (Green Bay)	Gabriel Rui K (Iowa)
19	Ja'Rome Johnson QB (Vegas)	Davontae Merriweather DB (Arizona)	Ernesto Lacayo K (Duke City)

=== Individual Awards ===
Award	Winner	Position	Team	Ref
IFL Most Valuable Player	Ja'Rome Johnson	Quarterback	Vegas Knight Hawks	
IFL Offensive Player of the Year	Sam Castronova	Quarterback	San Antonio Gunslingers	
IFL Defensive Player of the Year	Ravarius Rivers	Defensive back	Green Bay Blizzard	
IFL Special Teams Player of the Year	Gabriel Rui	Kicker	Iowa Barnstormers	
IFL Offensive Rookie of the Year	Josh Jones	Quarterback	Northern Arizona Wranglers	
IFL Defensive Rookie of the Year	Bryce Hampton	Defensive back	Vegas Knight Hawks	
IFL Head Coach of the Year	Corey Roberson	Head coach	Green Bay Blizzard	
IFL Assistant Coach of the Year	David Moran	Defensive coordinator	Northern Arizona Wranglers	

=== All-IFL Teams ===
The teams are split into three groups: the first team, the second team, and the rookie team. Representatives from each IFL team voted on the league's best players.Refs

==== Offense ====
Position	First Team	Second Team	Rookie Team
Quarterback	Sam Castronova, San Antonio Gunslingers	Ja'Rome Johnson, Vegas Knight Hawks	Josh Jones, Northern Arizona Wranglers
Running back	Jimmie Robinson, Massachusetts Pirates	Shannon Brooks, Arizona Rattlers	EJ Burgess, Green Bay Blizzard
Wide receiver	NyQwan Murray, San Antonio Gunslingers	DJ Myers, San Antonio Gunslingers	John Maldonado, Northern Arizona Wranglers
Wide receiver	Alexis Rosario, Tulsa Oilers	Arthur Jackson III, San Diego Strike Force	Quian Williams, Iowa Barnstormers
Wide receiver	John Maldonado, Northern Arizona Wranglers	Quian Williams, Iowa Barnstormers	Kobay White, Northern Arizona Wranglers
Center	Kyle Davis, Bay Area Panthers	Damian Love, Frisco Fighters	Kevin Toote, Vegas Knight Hawks
Offensive lineman	Lamar Mady, Arizona Rattlers	Johari Branch, Massachusetts Pirates	Tyran Hunt, Frisco Fighters
Offensive lineman	Tyran Hunt, Frisco Fighters	Moses Malory, Vegas Knight Hawks	Johari Branch, Massachusetts Pirates

==== Defense ====
Position	First Team	Second Team	Rookie Team
Defensive lineman	Noah Lyles, Tulsa Oilers	Ja'Quan Artis, San Diego Strike Force	KeShaun Moore, Quad City Steamwheelers
Defensive lineman	Tramond Lofton, Northern Arizona Wranglers	Rafiq Abdul-Wahid, Green Bay Blizzard	Olalere Oladipo, Green Bay Blizzard
Defensive lineman	Scean Mustin, Green Bay Blizzard	KeShaun Moore, Quad City Steamwheelers	Guy Thomas, Massachusetts Pirates
Linebacker	Jordan Jones, Tulsa Oilers	Makel Calhoun, Vegas Knight Hawks	Makel Calhoun, Vegas Knight Hawks
Linebacker / Defensive back	Antwon Kincade, Bay Area Panthers	Aaron Jackson, Duke City Gladiators	Ethan Caselberry, Frisco Fighters
Linebacker / Defensive back	Antwon Kincade, Bay Area Panthers	Elijah Reed, Sioux Falls Storm	Tyler Watson, Bay Area Panthers
Defensive back	Travion Banks, Northern Arizona Wranglers	Ethan Caselberry, Frisco Fighters	Bryce Hampton, Vegas Knight Hawks
Defensive back	Ravarius Rivers, Green Bay Blizzard	Joe Foucha, Bay Area Panthers	Joe Foucha, Bay Area Panthers
Defensive back	Bryce Hampton, Vegas Knight Hawks	Atoa Fox, San Diego Strike Force	Atoa Fox, San Diego Strike Force

==== Special Teams ====
Position	First Team	Second Team	Rookie Team
Kicker	Gabriel Rui, Iowa Barnstormers	Kyle Kaplan, Quad City Steamwheelers	Axel Perez, Northern Arizona Wranglers
Kick returner	Jarrod Harrington, Quad City Steamwheelers	Elijah Lilly, San Diego Strike Force	Quian Willams, Iowa Barnstormers

==== Number of selections per team ====
Team	Selections
Northern Arizona Wranglers	8
Vegas Knight Hawks	7
Bay Area Panthers	5
Frisco Fighters	5
Green Bay Blizzard	5
San Diego Strike Force	5
Iowa Barnstormers	4
Massachusetts Pirates	4
Quad City Steamwheelers	4
San Antonio Gunslingers	3
Tulsa Oilers	3
Arizona Rattlers	1
Duke City Gladiators	1
Sioux Falls Storm	1
Jacksonville Sharks	0
Tucson Sugar Skulls	0

== Media ==
In 2023, IFL announced a new broadcasting agreement with CBS Sports Network ensuring that the next three IFL National Championship games will air on the network. The deal also allows for additional games to be aired on CBS throughout the agreement. The remainder of the playoffs will be carried via the Stadium network, with online simulcasts through Stadium's YouTube channel. All other IFL games will still be streamed through YouTube, while some teams also have individual contracts with local or regional TV and radio channels.

== See also ==
- 2024 American Indoor Football season
- 2024 Arena Football League season
- 2024 National Arena League season
- 2024 The Arena League season
- 2024 UFL season
