= Paxton DeLaurent =

American gridiron football player (born 2002)

- DeLaurent with the Toronto Argonauts in 2026

Profile
- Position: Quarterback

Personal information
- Born: January 10, 2002 (age 24)
- Listed height: 6 ft 5 in (1.96 m)
- Listed weight: 229 lb (104 kg)

Career information
- High school: Camdenton (Camdenton, Missouri)
- College: Central Methodist (2020–2021); Southeast Missouri State (2022–2024)
- NFL draft: 2025: undrafted

Career history
- Orlando Pirates (2026); Toronto Argonauts (2026)

Awards and highlights
- IFL Offensive Rookie of the Year (2026); IFL All-Rookie Team (2026); Big South–OVC Offensive Player of the Year (2024); First-team All-Big South–OVC (2024); Big South–OVC All-Newcomer Team (2022); Second-team All-Heart South (2021); Heart South Freshman of the Year (2021)
- Stats at CFL.ca

Paxton DeLaurent (born January 10, 2002) is an American professional football quarterback. He played college football for the Central Methodist Eagles and the Southeast Missouri State Redhawks. DeLaurent also had a stint with the Orlando Pirates of the Indoor Football League (IFL).

== Early life ==
DeLaurent was born on January 10, 2002. He attended Camdenton High School in Camdenton, Missouri, where he threw for 7,909 passing yards and 98 touchdowns with 447 yards and 14 touchdowns on the ground.

== College career ==
DeLaurent played college football for the Central Methodist Eagles from 2020 to 2021 and the Southeast Missouri State Redhawks from 2022 to 2024. As a freshman, he played in five games, going 47 of 94 passing for 526 yards, six touchdowns, two interceptions with 86 rushing yards a touchdown.

The following year, DeLaurent was named the starter and threw for 2,499 total yards, 25 touchdowns and 14 interceptions. He added 475 rushing yards and seven touchdowns. DeLaurent earned second-team All-Heart South and Freshman of the Year honors in 2021.

In 2022, DeLaurent transferred to Southeast Missouri State University and in his first season, he completed 210 of 344 passes for 2,684 yards and 19 touchdowns. He rushed for 288 yards and three touchdowns. DeLaurent was named to the Big South–OVC All-Newcomer team. In 2023, he started the first seven games before a shoulder injury cut his season short. In those games DeLaurent went 159 of 247 passes for 1,792 yards and 11 touchdowns.

In DeLaurent's final year, he threw for 4,087 yards on 368 of 618 passing, 33 touchdowns and 15 interceptions. He added 96 yards and three touchdowns on the ground. In the first round of the FCS playoffs against Illinois State, DeLaurent tied an FCS single-game record with 85 passing attempts in a 35–27 loss. He was named the Big South–OVC Offensive Player of the Year and garnered first-team all-conference honors. DeLaurent was also a Walter Payton Award finalist.

== Professional career ==
DeLaurent spent the 2025 offseason in rookie minicamps with the Kansas City Chiefs and Buffalo Bills. After he was not signed to a contract he returned home to do student teaching and finish his degree.

=== Orlando Pirates ===
On January 24, 2026, DeLaurent signed with the Orlando Pirates of the Indoor Football League (IFL).

In 17 games, DeLaurent threw 289 of 409 passing for 3,142 yards, 64 touchdowns and 14 interceptions. He also had 685 rushing yards and 17 touchdowns. DeLaurent was named to the 2026 IFL All-Rookie Team and was the IFL Offensive Rookie of the Year.

=== Toronto Argonauts ===
On August 23, 2026, DeLaurent was signed by the Toronto Argonauts of the Canadian Football League (CFL). On August 26, he was moved to the practice roster. On October 2, DeLaurent was elevated to the active roster and dressed in his first game as a third-string quarterback the following day. On October 15, DeLaurent was released.
