= Sam Castronova =

American football player (born 1996)

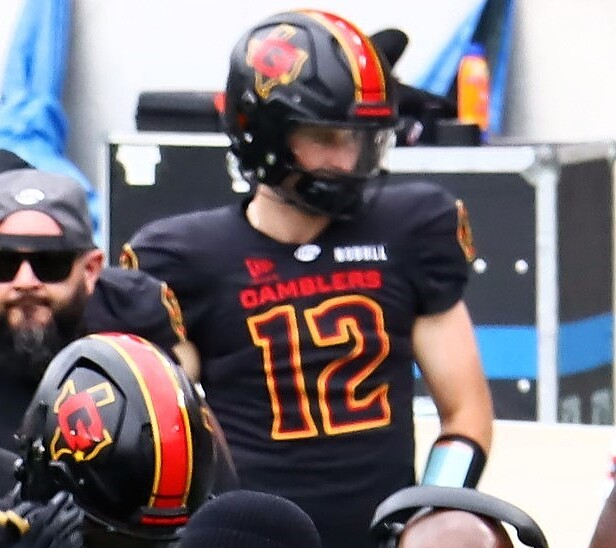
- Castronova in 2026

No. 2 – Arkansas Diamonds
- Position: Quarterback
- Roster status: Active

Personal information
- Born: April 20, 1996 (age 30)
- Listed height: 6 ft 1 in (1.85 m)
- Listed weight: 215 lb (98 kg)

Career information
- High school: Williamsville South (Williamsville, New York)
- College: Erie CC (2015–2016); Bethel (TN) (2017–2018)
- NFL draft: 2019: undrafted

Career history
- Carolina Cobras (2020–2021); Albany Empire (2022–2023); Jacksonville Sharks (2023); San Antonio Gunslingers (2024); Albany Firebirds (2025); Tulsa Oilers (2025); Memphis Showboats (2026)*; Albany Firebirds (2026)*; Houston Gamblers (2026); Albany Firebirds (2026); Arkansas Diamonds (2027-present)
- * Offseason or practice squad member only

Awards and highlights
- 2x First-team All-NAL (2022, 2023); NAL Most Valuable Player (2023); 2x NAL champion (2022, 2023); NAL Championship Game MVP (2023); First-team All-IFL (2024); IFL Offensive Player of the Year (2024); First-team All-Arena (2025); AF1 Most Valuable Player (2025); Arena Crown champion (2025); Arena Crown Most Valuable Player (2025)

Sam Castronova (born April 20, 1996) is an American professional football quarterback for the Arkansas Diamonds of the Indoor Football League (IFL). He played college football for the Bethel Wildcats and Erie Kats.

== College career ==
After high school, Castronova played the 2015 and 2016 seasons at Erie Community College. At Erie, he completed 52% of his passes for 3,272 yards, 32 touchdowns. Prior to the 2017 season, he transferred to Bethel University in Tennessee. Over the course of two seasons at Bethel, he passed 4,639 yards and 39 touchdowns while also rushing for nine touchdowns. He was named the Craig Mullins MSC Bluegrass Offensive Player of the Year in 2018.

== Professional career ==
After graduating, Castronova participated in numerous pro days, combines, local days, and showcases in an attempt to gain the attention of an NFL, CFL, or XFL team, but was not signed by any.

=== Carolina Cobras ===
Finally on November 12, 2019, he signed with the Carolina Cobras of the National Arena League. After the cancellation of the 2020 NAL season due to the coronavirus pandemic, Castronova re-signed with the Cobras before the 2021 season.

=== Albany Empire ===
Castronova signed with the Albany Empire in 2022 and took over as the team's starting quarterback in the second week of the season. During the season, he led the Empire to their second National Arena League title in two years. He also won four offensive player of the week awards while passing for 2,639 yards and 58 touchdowns, both second in the league. Castronova also led the league with 226 rushing yards and 15 rushing touchdowns.

On November 8, 2022, Castronova re-signed with Albany.

On April 30, 2023, Castronova was released by the team and locked out of his hotel room by team owner Antonio Brown.

=== Jacksonville Sharks ===
After being released by the Albany Empire, Castronova quickly signed with the Jacksonville Sharks and led them to the league title game. On August 12, 2023, Castronova led the Sharks to a 54-45 victory over the Carolina Cobras in the 2023 NAL title game. He earned recognition as the Championship Game MVP after passing for 241 yards and four touchdowns and contributing two rushing touchdowns. Castronova was also named NAL MVP after the season.

=== San Antonio Gunslingers ===
On October 2, 2023, the San Antonio Gunslingers signed Castronova. Through 16 games with the Gunslingers, Castronova led the Indoor Football League (IFL) with 3,346 passing yards and 75 passing touchdowns and also added 23 rushing touchdowns to his total. He was named Offensive Player of the Year at the end of the season and was recognized with First-team All-IFL honors.

=== Albany Firebirds ===
In 2025, Castronova signed with the Albany Firebirds. In ten games with the team, he led the Firebirds to a perfect record while passing for 1,735 yards and 48 touchdowns. In the playoffs, he led the Firebirds to win the inaugural Arena Crown Championship. He was named the 2025 AF1 MVP after the season.

=== Tulsa Oilers ===
After concluding the AF1 season with the Firebirds, Castronova signed with the Tulsa Oilers of the IFL on July 14, 2025. He led the Oilers to a playoff berth while completing 64% of his passes for 520 yards and 14 touchdowns.

=== Memphis Showboats ===
On August 11, 2025, the Memphis Showboats signed Castronova to a contract as part of a group signing of four of the Firebirds' core offensive players. The team would fold later that year before Castronova appeared in a game for them, and the quartet went unclaimed in the subsequent 2026 UFL draft.

=== Albany Firebirds (second stint) ===
On January 28, 2026, Castronova re-signed with the Firebirds.

=== Houston Gamblers ===
On April 7, 2026, days before the start of the AF1 season, it was announced that Castronova was signing a contract with the Houston Gamblers after injuries to quarterbacks Nolan Henderson and Hunter Dekkers. Castronova's signings with the Showboats and the Gamblers came largely through a personal negotiation with Jim Monos, who had been the Showboats general manager and moved into the UFL central office after the Showboats were folded. Castronova was released by the Gamblers on May 1.

=== Albany Firebirds (third stint) ===
On May 6, 2026, Castronova re-signed with the Firebirds. In his first game back with Albany, he scored six touchdowns while leading the Firebirds to their sixth straight win of the season. He shared starting duties that year with Josh Kulka, which allowed Castronova to tend to a family emergency late in the season.

=== Arkansas Diamonds ===
On September 20, 2026, it was announced that the Arkansas Diamonds of the Indoor Football League had signed Castronova for the 2027 season. The Diamonds had recently moved from The Arena League to the IFL at the end of the 2026 season.

== Personal life ==
Castronova contributes as a guest on the FIRST Down Pregame Show on WBBZ-TV during the autumn football season.
