= Orlando Pirates (IFL) =

American indoor football team

- Current season
Logo

General information
- Founded: 2017; 9 years ago
- Headquartered: Orlando, Florida
- Colors: Teal, navy, gold, white
- Mascot: Arthur
- Website: orlandopirates.com

Personnel
- Owners: Hassan Yatim; Jawad Yatim; Giovanny Olarte; Nayrouz Olarte
- General manager: Jawad Yatim
- Head coach: Rod Windsor
- President: Jawad Yatim

Team history
- Massachusetts Pirates (2018–2025); Orlando Pirates (2026–present)

Home fields
- Kia Center (2025–present): Tsongas Center (2024–2025); DCU Center (2018–2023)

League / conference affiliations
- National Arena League (2018–2020); Indoor Football League (2021–present); Eastern Conference (2022–present)

Championships
- League championships: 1: United Bowl/IFL National Championships (1) 2021
- Conference championships: 1: IFL Eastern: 2024

Playoff appearances (7)
- NAL: 2018, 2019; IFL: 2021, 2022, 2023, 2024, 2026

The Orlando Pirates are a professional indoor football team based in Orlando, Florida that competes in the Indoor Football League (IFL). The team plays its home games at Kia Center. They began play in the 2018 season as the Massachusetts Pirates and as a member of the National Arena League (NAL).

The Pirates were the first indoor or arena football team to call Lowell home. Before moving to Lowell, the Pirates were based in Worcester, Massachusetts, and played their home games at the DCU Center. The Pirates were the third indoor/arena team to call Worcester home, following the Massachusetts Marauders of the Arena Football League (1994) and the New England Surge of the Continental Indoor Football League (2007–2008). And they are the first team to play in Orlando since the Orlando Predators, who played in the original Arena Football League (1991–2016), the NAL and the failed reboot of the AFL (2024).

== History ==
=== National Arena League (2017–2019) ===
After numerous speculation beforehand, the Massachusetts Pirates were officially announced as members of the NAL on November 15, 2017. The team began play in the 2018 season. The Pirates won their inaugural game, played at the DCU Center on April 7, defeating the Maine Mammoths 51–24. They were led most of the season by quarterback Sean Brackett until the second-to-last regular season game where he was injured for the remainder of the season in a 46–35 loss to the Jacksonville Sharks, who then took over the top seed in the NAL. Darron Thomas started the following week in 67–7 win over the win-less Lehigh Valley Steelhawks; following a Sharks loss to the Mammoths the Pirates secured the top seed and a home game in the 2018 playoffs. The team finished their inaugural season with a regular season record of 11–5 but lost the semifinal playoff game to the Columbus Lions 50–36. After the season, inaugural head coach Ameer Ismail was hired as the head coach of the San Diego Strike Force expansion team in the Indoor Football League, but then joined the NAL's Carolina Cobras instead.

For the 2019 season, offensive coordinator Anthony Payton was named the head coach. The team finished in third place with an 8–6 record and qualified for the playoffs. They lost the semifinal game to the Carolina Cobras 30–26.

Following the 2019 season, the NAL announced it was creating a new league via a merger with Champions Indoor Football. The Pirates announced it did not agree with the merger and withdrew from the league. Head coach Payton then left to become head coach of the Carolina Cobras and was replaced by Patrick Pass. Two weeks after the announced merger, it was dissolved and the Pirates rejoined the NAL. The 2020 season was then cancelled due to the COVID-19 pandemic making arenas unavailable. The team was removed from the NAL when it was not offered an extension on its initial three-year membership agreement while the team was openly looking to join other leagues.

=== Indoor Football League (2021–present) ===
On August 19, 2020, the Pirates announced that they were joining the Indoor Football League for the 2021 season as its first East Coast-based team and had signed a three-year lease extension with the DCU Center. The Pirates finished in second place following the regular season and defeated the regular season champion, the Arizona Rattlers, in the United Bowl to win their first league championship.

In 2022, head coach Pass transitioned to become the director of football personnel development for the Pirates and defensive coordinator Rayshaun Kizer was promoted to head coach. The Pirates finished the season with a record of 11–5 in the regular season and fell to the Quad City Steamwheelers in the first round of the IFL playoffs in OT 39–38. Four players were selected to the All-IFL team at the end of the season. Defensive back Aarion Maxey-Penton and wide receiver Thomas Owens received First All-IFL team honors while defensive lineman Da'Sean Downey and offensive lineman Roubbens Joseph received Second All-IFL team honors.

On November 6, 2023, the Pirates announced that they had signed a multi-year lease with the Tsongas Center at UMass Lowell beginning with the 2024 season. On October 18, 2025, the team announced that they were "leaving Massachusetts" after seven seasons.

==== Move to Orlando (2026–present) ====
On November 17, 2025, they announced they are moving from Lowell, Massachusetts (Tsongas Center) to Orlando, Florida. They will play in the Kia Center.

== Personnel ==
=== Roster ===
2026 Orlando Pirates roster
Quarterbacks: 5 James Blackman; 11 Paxton DeLaurent; Running Backs: 7 Pooka Williams; Wide Receivers: 88 Ja'Khi Douglas; 6 Isaiah McKoy; 8 Nyqwan Murray; 81 Thomas Owens; 9 Teo Redding; Offensive Linemen: 74 Temi Ajirotutu; 77 Jeremiah Crawford; 66 Nick Jones; 70 Darta Lee	Defensive Linemen: 58 Deonte Anderson; 95 D. J. Dale; 94 Mike Mason; 98 Devonte O'Malley; Linebackers: 13 Hector Johnson; Defensive Backs: 21 Corrion Ballard; 2 DJ Daniel; 3 Javaris Davis; 4 Tyree Gillespie; 12 Dexter Lawson Jr.; 14 Destin Mack; 20 Leon O'Neal Jr.	Special Teams: 19 Alejandro Mata; Roster (updated June 14, 2026)

=== Staff ===
2026 Orlando Pirates staff

Front office

- Jeff Freyer – Co-owner
- Hassan Yatim – Co-owner
- Jawad Yatim – Founder/CEO/General Manager

Head coaches

- Rob Keefe – Head coach/defensive coordinator
- Toby Johnson – Assistant head coach/defensive line/defensive run game coordinator

Offensive coaches

- Rod Windsor – Offensive coordinator
- Les Moss – Assistant director of football operations and offensive line coach/run game coordinator
- Jake Moss – Offensive quality control coordinator/wide receivers

Defensive coaches

- Khalid Wooten – Defensive backs
- E. J. Burt – Defensive quality control coordinator

== Statistics ==
=== Season-by-season results ===
League champions	Conference champions	Playoff berth	League leader

Season	League	Conference	Regular season				Postseason results
Season	League	Conference	Finish	Wins	Losses	Ties	Postseason results
2018	NAL		1st	11	5	0	Lost semifinal (Columbus) 36–50
2019	NAL		3rd	8	6	0	Lost semifinal (Carolina) 26–30
2020	NAL	Season cancelled due to COVID-19 pandemic					
2021	IFL		2nd	11	3	0	Won first round (Bismarck) 44–19; Won semifinal (Frisco) 43–22; Won United Bowl (Arizona) 37–34
2022	IFL	Eastern	2nd	11	5	0	Lost quarterfinals (Quad City) 38–39
2023	IFL	Eastern	3rd	9	6	0	Lost quarterfinals (Sioux Falls) 39–42
2024	IFL	Eastern	3rd	8	8	0	Won first round (Frisco) 53–50; Won semifinal (Green Bay) 51–28; Lost IFL National Championship (Arizona) 16–53
2025	IFL	Eastern	5th	7	9	0	
2026	IFL	Eastern	4th	10	6	0	Lost first round (Green Bay) 59–73
Totals				75	48	0	All-time regular season record
Totals				5	6	—	All-time postseason record
Totals				80	54	0	All-time regular season and postseason record

=== Head coaches ===
Name	Term	Regular season				Playoffs		Awards
Name	Term	W	L	T	Win%	W	L	Awards
Ameer Ismail	2018; 2025 (Did not coach)	11	5	0	.688	0	1	
Anthony Payton	2019	8	6	0	.571	0	1	
Patrick Pass	2020–2021	11	3	0	.786	3	0	2021 United Bowl Champion
Rayshaun Kizer	2022	11	5	0	.647	0	1	
Mark Stoute	2023	9	6	0	.600	0	1	
Rod Miller	2024	8	8	0	.500	2	1	2024 IFL National Championship Finalist
Fred Griggs	2025	2	3	0	.400	0	0	
Tom Menas	2025	5	6	0	.454	0	0	
Rob Keefe	2026	2	0	0	1.000	0	0	
Rod Windsor	2026-present	8	6	0	.571	0	1	
