= 2026 Indoor Football League season =

2026 IFL season
- League: Indoor Football League
- Sport: Indoor football
- Duration: March 14 – August 16
- Teams: 14

Playoffs
- Eastern champions: Green Bay Blizzard
- Eastern runners-up: Tulsa Oilers
- Western champions: Arizona Rattlers
- Western runners-up: San Diego Strike Force

2026 IFL National Championship
- Date: August 16, 2026
- Venue: Tucson Arena
- Champions: Arizona Rattlers
- Runners-up: Green Bay Blizzard

IFL seasons
- ← 2025 2027 →

The 2026 IFL season was the 18th season of the Indoor Football League. There are 14 teams with the addition of the New Mexico Chupacabras and the exit of the Bay Area Panthers. The season began on March 14 with the Fishers Freight defeating the Quad City Steamwheelers during IFL Opening Weekend, and concluded with the 2026 IFL National Championship Game at Tucson Arena in Tucson, Arizona, on August 16.

== Preseason ==
On August 22, 2025, the former Duke City Gladiators announced that they were returning to the IFL for the 2026 season under new ownership, rebranding as the New Mexico Chupacabras, moving back to Albuquerque and the Tingley Coliseum and hiring current Vegas Knight Hawks offensive line coach Kyle Moore-Brown as their new head coach.

On September 18, 2025, it was announced that the Bay Area Panthers were going dormant for the 2026 season and that the players were released as free agents

On October 18, 2025, the Massachusetts Pirates announced that they were "leaving Massachusetts" after seven seasons.

On November 17, 2025, the IFL website announced the Pirates moved to Orlando and will play in the 2026 season in the Kia Center.

== Teams ==
For the 2026 season, the league is split into two conferences.

The playoffs will have the top four teams per conference qualifying, and will be seeded first through fourth.

Conference	Team	Location	Arena	Capacity	Founded	Joined	Head coach
Eastern Conference	Fishers Freight	Fishers, Indiana	Fishers Event Center	6,500	2023	2025	Dixie Wooten
Eastern Conference	Green Bay Blizzard	Ashwaubenon, Wisconsin	Resch Center	8,600	2003	2010	Corey Roberson
Eastern Conference	Iowa Barnstormers	Des Moines, Iowa	Casey's Center	15,181	1995	2015	Andre Coles
Eastern Conference	Jacksonville Sharks	Jacksonville, Florida	VyStar Veterans Memorial Arena	13,011	2009	2024	Jason Gibson
Eastern Conference	Orlando Pirates	Orlando, Florida	Kia Center	17,192	2017	2021; 2025	Rod Windsor
Eastern Conference	Quad City Steamwheelers	Moline, Illinois	Vibrant Arena	9,200	2017	2019	Cory Ross
Eastern Conference	Tulsa Oilers	Tulsa, Oklahoma	BOK Center	16,582	2022	2023	Marvin Jones
Western Conference	Arizona Rattlers	Glendale, Arizona	Desert Diamond Arena	19,000	1992	2017	Kevin Guy
Western Conference	New Mexico Chupacabras	Albuquerque, New Mexico	Tingley Coliseum	11,571	2015	2020; 2026	Kyle Moore-Brown
Western Conference	Northern Arizona Wranglers	Prescott Valley, Arizona	Findlay Toyota Center	6,000	2020	2021	Ron James
Western Conference	San Antonio Gunslingers	San Antonio, Texas	Freeman Coliseum	9,800	2020	2024	Jonathan Bane
Western Conference	San Diego Strike Force	Oceanside, California	Frontwave Arena	7,500	2018	2019	Taylor Genuser
Western Conference	Tucson Sugar Skulls	Tucson, Arizona	Tucson Convention Center	9,000	2018	2019	Rayshaun Kizer
Western Conference	Vegas Knight Hawks	Henderson, Nevada	Lee's Family Forum	5,567	2021	2022	Mike Davis

== Regular season ==
=== Standings ===
==== Eastern Conference ====
Team	W	L	PCT	GB	CONF
Green Bay Blizzard	13	3	.813	-	11-3
Jacksonville Sharks	11	5	.688	2.0	8-3
Tulsa Oilers	11	5	.688	2.0	7-4
Orlando Pirates	10	6	.625	3.0	7-4
Fishers Freight	8	8	.500	5.0	6-8
Quad City Steamwheelers	5	11	.313	8.0	4-9
Iowa Barnstormers	1	15	.063	12.0	1-13

==== Western Conference ====
Team	W	L	PCT	GB	CONF
San Diego Strike Force	13	3	.813	-	11-2
Vegas Knight Hawks	12	4	.750	1.0	9-3
Arizona Rattlers	11	5	.688	2.0	10-3
Tucson Sugar Skulls	7	9	.438	6.0	6-8
San Antonio Gunslingers	5	11	.313	8.0	4-5
Northern Arizona Wranglers	3	13	.188	10.0	2-12
New Mexico Chupacabras	2	14	.636	11.0	2-11

==== Notes ====
(Note: The procedure used to determine tiebreakers is: 1) Conference record 2) Head-to-head record, 3) Strength of schedule, 4) Head-to-head point differential, and 5) Overall point differential)

== Playoffs ==
Conference Semifinals
1	San Diego	54
4	Tucson	47
2	Vegas	36
3	Arizona	47
1	Green Bay	73
4	Orlando	59
2	Jacksonville	28
3	Tulsa	31

Conference Finals
1	San Diego	37
3	Arizona	43
1	Green Bay	67
3	Tulsa	60

National Championship (August 16)
3	Arizona	62
1	Green Bay	51

== Awards ==
=== All-IFL teams ===
All-IFL First Team
Offense
QB	T. J. Edwards (TUL)
RB	Pooka Williams Jr. (ORL)
WR	Jerminic Smith (TUL); Arland Bruce IV (AZ); Ka'Ron Ashley (SA)
C	Jalen Booth (SD)
OL	Kristopher Stroughter (AZ); LaQuinston Sharp (JAX)
Defense
DL	KeShaun Moore (QC); Adam Anderson (SD); Rafiq Abdul-Wahid (TUC)
LB	Isaiah Majo (VEG)
LB/DB	Tre Harvey (TUL)
DB	Yahsyn McKee Sr. (AZ); Carl Decius (AZ); Ravarius Rivers (SA)
Special Teams
K	Andrew Mevis (GB)
KR	Pooka Williams Jr. (ORL)

IFL All-Rookie Team
Offense
QB	Paxton DeLaurent (ORL)
RB	Kairee Robinson (GB)
WR	Deon Cook (SA); Senika McKie (VEG); Jordan Davis (FIS)
C	Raheem Anderson II (GB)
OL	Charles Turner III (VEG); Baraka Beckett (JAX)
Defense
DL	Charles Rosser (QC); Devonte O'Malley (ORL); Adam Anderson (SD)
LB	Isaiah Major (VEG)
LB/DB	Herman Smith (SD)
DB	Yahsyn McKee Sr. (AZ); Carl Decius (AZ); Justin Harrington (TUL)
Special Teams
K	Matthew Cook (AZ)
KR	Walter Wilbon III (NM)

All-IFL Second Team
Offense
QB	Nate Davis (SD)
RB	Jimmie Robinson (JAX)
WR	Nyqwan Murray (ORL); Quain Williams (QC); Quinton Randolph (VEG)
C	Kenny Fehrman (JAX)
OL	Ivory Scott (SD); Christian Coulter (VEG)
Defense
DL	Terry Beckner (SA); Allen Henry (GB); Charles Rosser (QC)
LB	Royce See (SD)
LB/DB	Davontae Merriweather (AZ)
DB	Terry Roberts (VEG); Kevin Ransom Jr. (QC); Kieran Page (NAZ)
Special Teams
K	Calum Sutherland (FIS)
KR	Josiah King (FIS)
