= Milwaukee Panthers men's basketball statistical leaders =

The Milwaukee Panthers men's basketball statistical leaders are individual statistical leaders of the Milwaukee Panthers men's basketball program in various categories, including points, rebounds, assists, steals, and blocks. Within those areas, the lists identify single-game, single-season, and career leaders. The Panthers represent University of Wisconsin–Milwaukee in the NCAA's Horizon League.

Milwaukee began competing in intercollegiate basketball in 1896. However, the school's record book does not generally list records from before the 1950s, as records from before this period are often incomplete and inconsistent. Since scoring was much lower in this era, and teams played much fewer games during a typical season, it is likely that few or no players from this era would appear on these lists anyway.

The NCAA did not officially record assists as a stat until the 1983–84 season, and blocks and steals until the 1985–86 season, but Milwaukee's record books includes players in these stats before these seasons. These lists are updated through the end of the 2020–21 season.

== Scoring ==
Career
Rk	Player	Points	Seasons
1	Clay Tucker	1,788	1999–00 2000–01 2001–02 2002–03
2	Larry Reed	1,693	1959–60 1964–65 1965–66 1966–67
3	Jerry Grochowski	1,688	1957–58 1958–59 1959–60 1960–61
4	Gerald Hardnett	1,602	1975–76 1976–77 1977–78 1978–79
5	Tom Kneusel	1,565	1955–56 1956–57 1957–58 1958–59
6	Tom Reikowski	1,459	1965–66 1966–67 1967–68 1968–69 1969–70
7	Chad Angeli	1,417	1997–98 1998–99 1999–00 2000–01
8	Joah Tucker	1,416	2003–04 2004–05 2005–06
9	Dylan Page	1,388	2000–01 2001–02 2002–03 2003–04
10	Dexter Riesch	1,359	1966–67 1967–68 1968–69 1969–70

Season
Rk	Player	Points	Season
1	Von McDade	830	1990–91
2	Shannon Smith	661	1994–95
3	Dylan Page	647	2003–04
4	Kevin Jones	609	1981–82
5	BJ Freeman	581	2022–23
6	BJ Freeman	570	2023–24
7	Dylan Page	565	2002–03
8	Gerald Hardnett	556	1977–78
	Ed McCants	556	2004–05
10	Clay Tucker	550	2002–03

Single game
Rk	Player	Points	Season	Opponent
1	Von McDade	50	1990–91	Illinois
2	Gerald Hardnett	46	1977–78	Valparaiso
3	Tom Kneusel	44	1955–56	Oshkosh
	Phil Michalovitz	44	1965–66	UIC
5	Von McDade	43	1990–91	Southern Utah
	BJ Freeman	43	2022–23	Stetson
7	Von McDade	42	1990–91	Wright State
	Von McDade	42	1990–91	W. Michigan
	Von McDade	42	1990–91	Southern Utah
10	Clay Tucker	40	2002–03	Wright State

== Rebounds ==
Career
Rk	Player	Rebounds	Seasons
1	Larry Reed	1,529	1959–60 1964–65 1965–66 1966–67
3	Tom Reikowski	1,080	1965–66 1966–67 1967–68 1968–69 1969–70
2	Tom Kneusel	1,164	1955–56 1956–57 1957–58 1958–59
4	Adrian Tigert	760	2001–02 2003–04 2004–05 2005–06
5	Richard Cox	753	1971–72 1972–73 1973–74
6	Matt Tiby	734	2013–14 2014–15 2015–16
7	Erik Schten	611	1985–86 1986–87 1987–88
8	Clay Tucker	592	1999–00 2000–01 2001–02 2002–03
9	Craig Greene	557	1989–90 1990–91 1991–92 1992–93
10	Al Walker	546	1975–76 1976–77 1977–78

Season
Rk	Player	Rebounds	Season
1	Larry Reed	462	1966–67
2	Larry Reed	425	1965–66
3	Larry Reed	385	1964–65
4	Jamichael Stillwell	333	2024–25
5	Tom Reikowski	316	1966–67
6	Tom Kneusel	314	1957–58

Single game
Rk	Player	Rebounds	Season	Opponent
1	Cecil Morries	34	1969–70	St. Norbert
2	Larry Reed	32	1965–66	Lakeland
3	Tom Hanrahan	28	1956–57	Platteville
4	Tom Kneusel	26	1956–57	Oshkosh
5	Roger Kriete	25	1962–63	Platteville

== Assists ==
Career
Rk	Player	Assists	Seasons
1	Gerald Hardnett	448	1975–76 1976–77 1977–78 1978–79
2	Kaylon Williams	383	2010–11 2011–12
3	Marc Mitchell	345	1991–92 1992–93
4	Clay Tucker	341	1999–00 2000–01 2001–02 2002–03
5	Cyrus Caldwell	333	1996–97 1997–98 1998–99
6	Ricky Franklin	332	2006–07 2007–08 2008–09 2009–10
7	Adrian Tigert	309	2001–02 2003–04 2004–05 2005–06
8	Chris Hill	304	2001–02 2002–03 2003–04 2004–05
9	Tim Cullen	303	1976–77 1977–78 1978–79 1979–80

Season
Rk	Player	Assists	Season
1	Jordan Johnson	267	2015–16
2	Kaylon Williams	215	2011–12
3	Marc Mitchell	189	1992–93
4	Themus Fulks	188	2024–25
5	Kaylon Williams	178	2010–11
6	Marc Mitchell	156	1991–92
7	Te'Jon Lucas	153	2019–20

Single game
Rk	Player	Assists	Season	Opponent
1	Jordan Johnson	15	2015–16	UIC
2	Kaylon Williams	14	2010–11	UIC
	Kerry Glover	14	1981–82	Grand Valley State
4	Esyah Pippa-White	13	2025–26	Oakland
	Te'Jon Lucas	13	2020–21	Oakland
	Jordan Johnson	13	2015–16	Duquesne
	Marc Mitchell	13	1992–93	NE Illinois
	Marc Mitchell	13	1991–92	Parkside
	Larry Pikes	13	1975–76	

== Steals ==
Career
Rk	Player	Steals	Seasons
1	Clay Tucker	194	1999–00 2000–01 2001–02 2002–03
2	Gerald Hardnett	162	1975–76 1976–77 1977–78 1978–79
3	Marc Mitchell	156	1991–92 1992–93
4	Ronnie Jones	131	1999–00 2000–01 2001–02 2002–03
5	Maurice Turner	128	1985–86 1986–87 1987–88 1988–89
6	Tim Cullen	126	1976–77 1977–78 1978–79 1979–80
	Dwayne Glover	126	1984–85 1985–86
8	Chris Hill	120	2001–02 2002–03 2003–04 2004–05
9	Clarence Wright	117	1987–88 1988–89

Season
Rk	Player	Steals	Season
1	Von McDade	97	1990–91
2	Gerald Hardnett	85	1977–78
3	Dwayne Glover	79	1985–86
4	Marc Mitchell	78	1992–93
	Marc Mitchell	78	1991–92
6	Clarence Wright	67	1988–89
7	Gerald Hardnett	65	1976–77
	Clay Tucker	65	2001–02
9	Clay Tucker	59	2002–03

Single game
Rk	Player	Steals	Season	Opponent
1	Von McDade	8	1990–91	Southern Utah
	Kerry Glover	8	1984–85	Lakeland
3	Kelvin Anderson	7	1994–95	Butler
	Marc Mitchell	7	1992–93	Sacramento St.
	Marc Mitchell	7	1991–92	Oshkosh
	Von McDade	7	1990–91	W. Michigan
	Von McDade	7	1990–91	UMKC
	Gerald Hardnett	7	1977–78	Portland State
	Gerald Hardnett	7	1977–78	Valparaiso
	Kerry Glover	7	1980–81	Northland
	Kentrell Pullian	7	2024–25	Lakeland

== Blocks ==
Career
Rk	Player	Blocks	Seasons
1	J.J. Panoske	154	2012–13 2013–14 2014–15 2015–16
2	Craig Greene	87	1989–90 1990–91 1991–92 1992–93
3	Brett Prahl	81	2014–15 2015–16 2016–17 2017–18
4	Al Walker	78	1975–76 1976–77 1977–78
5	Nate Mielke	78	2001–02 2002–03 2003–04
6	Clay Tucker	77	1999–00 2000–01 2001–02 2002–03
7	Dylan Page	74	2000–01 2001–02 2002–03 2003–04

Season
Rk	Player	Blocks	Season
1	Ahmad Rand	72	2022–23
2	J.J. Panoske	54	2015–16
3	Bryce Nze	48	2017–18
4	Brett Prahl	46	2017–18
	Al Walker	46	1977–78
6	Joey St. Pierre	44	2021–22
7	J.J. Panoske	41	2012–13
8	Ryan Allen	40	2011–12
9	Faizon Fields	39	2023–24
10	Dylan Page	37	2003–04
	Eugene Sims	37	1993–94

Single game
Rk	Player	Blocks	Season	Opponent
1	J.J. Panoske	8	2015–16	Northern Kentucky
2	J.J. Panoske	7	2012–13	Loyola
3	Ryan Allen	6	2011–12	Marquette
	Bruce Payton	6	1985–86	St. Xavier (Ill.)
