= Milwaukee Panthers =

Intercollegiate teams of University of Wisconsin–Milwaukee

- University: University of Wisconsin–Milwaukee
- Conference: Horizon League
- NCAA: Division I
- Athletic director: Amanda Braun
- Location: Milwaukee, Wisconsin
- Varsity teams: 13
- Basketball arena: UW–Milwaukee Panther Arena (men); Klotsche Center (men/women)
- Baseball stadium: Franklin Field
- Soccer stadium: Engelmann Stadium
- Mascot: Pounce Panther
- Nickname: Panthers
- Fight song: UWM Fight Song
- Colors: Black and gold
- Website: mkepanthers.com

The Milwaukee Panthers are the athletic teams representing the University of Wisconsin–Milwaukee. They compete as a member of the National Collegiate Athletic Association (NCAA) Division I level, competing in the Horizon League for all sports since the 1994–95 season. A total of 13 Panthers athletic teams compete in NCAA Division I. The Panthers have won the James J. McCafferty Trophy as the Horizon League's all-sports champions seven times since 2000.

== History ==
Milwaukee's athletic teams are nicknamed the Panthers, having previously been the Green Gulls (1927–1956) and Cardinals (1956–1964), adopting the Panthers nickname in 1964. Before 1990, the university's athletics program spent the majority of its history at the NCAA Division III and II levels, as well as several years at the NAIA level. All non-Division I sports moved to the NCAA Division I level for the 1990–91 academic year.

== Sports sponsored ==
Men's sports	Women's sports
Baseball	Basketball
Basketball	Cross country
Cross country	Soccer
Soccer	Swimming and diving
Swimming and diving	Tennis
Track and field^{†}	Track and field^{†}
	Volleyball
† – Track and field includes both indoor and outdoor

A member of the Horizon League, Milwaukee sponsors teams in six men's and seven women's NCAA-sanctioned sports.

=== Baseball ===
The Panthers are the only Division I college baseball team in the state of Wisconsin. They have also qualified for four NCAA tournaments since 1999, most notably recording an 8–4 win over regional host Rice in the first round of the 1999 NCAA tournament. They also appeared in the 2001, 2002, and 2010 tournaments.

The first Panther to appear in a Major League Baseball game was outfielder Daulton Varsho, who debuted for the Arizona Diamondbacks in 2020. In 2025, AJ Blubaugh became the second Panther and first UWM pitcher to play in MLB after debuting for the Houston Astros.

=== Men's basketball ===
The Panthers men's basketball team has had several high-profile head coaches, including Bo Ryan (1999–2001), who was a national runner-up in 2014 as the head coach at Wisconsin, and Bruce Pearl (2001–2005), who made the 2019 Final Four as head coach at Auburn.

Milwaukee made one appearance in the NCAA Division III men's basketball tournament in 1982 and two in the NCAA Division II men's basketball tournament: one in 1960, and one where they reached the Elite Eight in 1989.

As a Division I program, Milwaukee has made four NCAA tournaments since 2003, most notably, the 2005 tournament. As the twelfth seed in the Midwest regional, the Panthers upset fifth-seeded Alabama in the first round and fourth-seeded Boston College in the second round to reach the Sweet Sixteen. The Panthers would go on to lose in that round to the top-seeded eventual tournament runner-up Illinois.

The Panthers have made four postseason appearances outside of the NCAA tournament, including two in the National Invitation Tournament and two in the College Basketball Invitational.

The Panthers have had five players selected in the NBA draft. The highest selection is Patrick Baldwin Jr., who was selected with the 28th pick in the first round by the Golden State Warriors in 2022.

=== Women's basketball ===
The Milwaukee women's basketball team began as a founding member of the Association for Intercollegiate Athletics for Women in 1972 before moving with the rest of the university sports to NAIA in 1982.

The Panthers made their first NCAA tournament appearance at any level with the 2001 NCAA Division I women's basketball tournament, appearing again in 2006. They have also appeared in three Women's National Invitation Tournaments and one Women's Basketball Invitational.

=== Men's soccer ===
The Milwaukee men's soccer team has made six NCAA tournaments since 2002, including four straight where they advanced to the second round. In the 2004 and 2005 tournaments, the Panthers lost to the top team in the country in the second round: 2004 against UC Santa Barbara in double-overtime and 2005 against New Mexico on penalty kicks.

Panthers men's soccer holds the attendance record for Engelmann Stadium, which was set during a match against cross-town rival Marquette on September 3, 2015, with a crowd of 4,030.

=== Women's soccer ===
Milwaukee's women's soccer team has won the Horizon League tournament and 12 times since 1997 and has made the NCAA tournament 16 times since then, including six straight from 2008 to 2013. The Panthers have also made every NCAA tournament since 2018, winning two tournament matches in that span.

Milwaukee's highest end-of-season ranking is 23, which they achieved in 2011 following a Horizon League Championship and a win in the NCAA tournament at home against Illinois State.

=== Women's volleyball ===
The women's volleyball team at Milwaukee has also enjoyed national success in recent years, qualifying for six of the last nine NCAA Tournaments and compiling an all-time record of 867–477–7 through the end of the 2006 season.

=== Football ===
Milwaukee's now-defunct football program competed at the NCAA College Division (now NCAA Division II) level; due to lack of funds and a long string of losing seasons, they dropped the sport after the 1974 season.

== Gallery ==
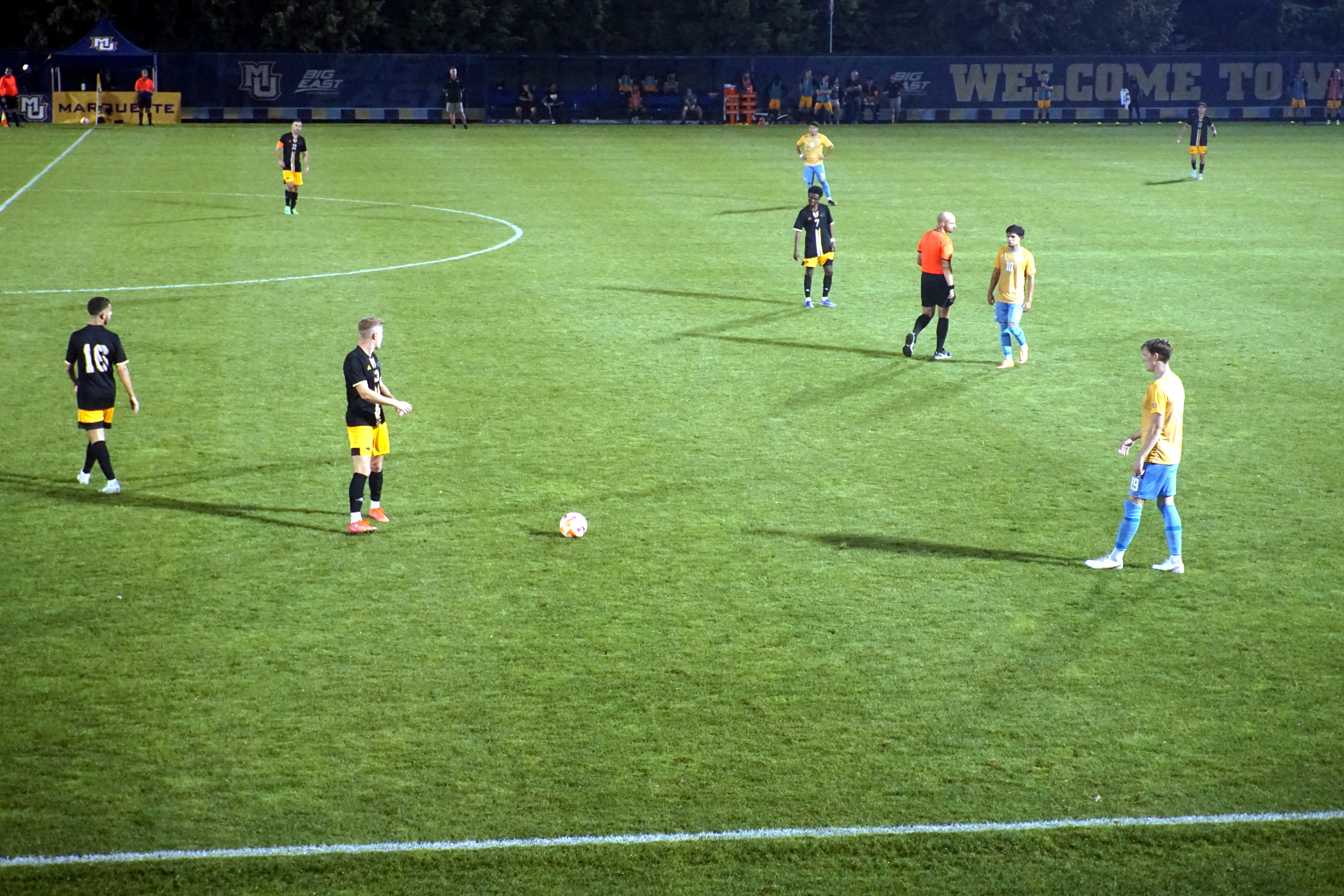
Milwaukee men's soccer team in action against Marquette

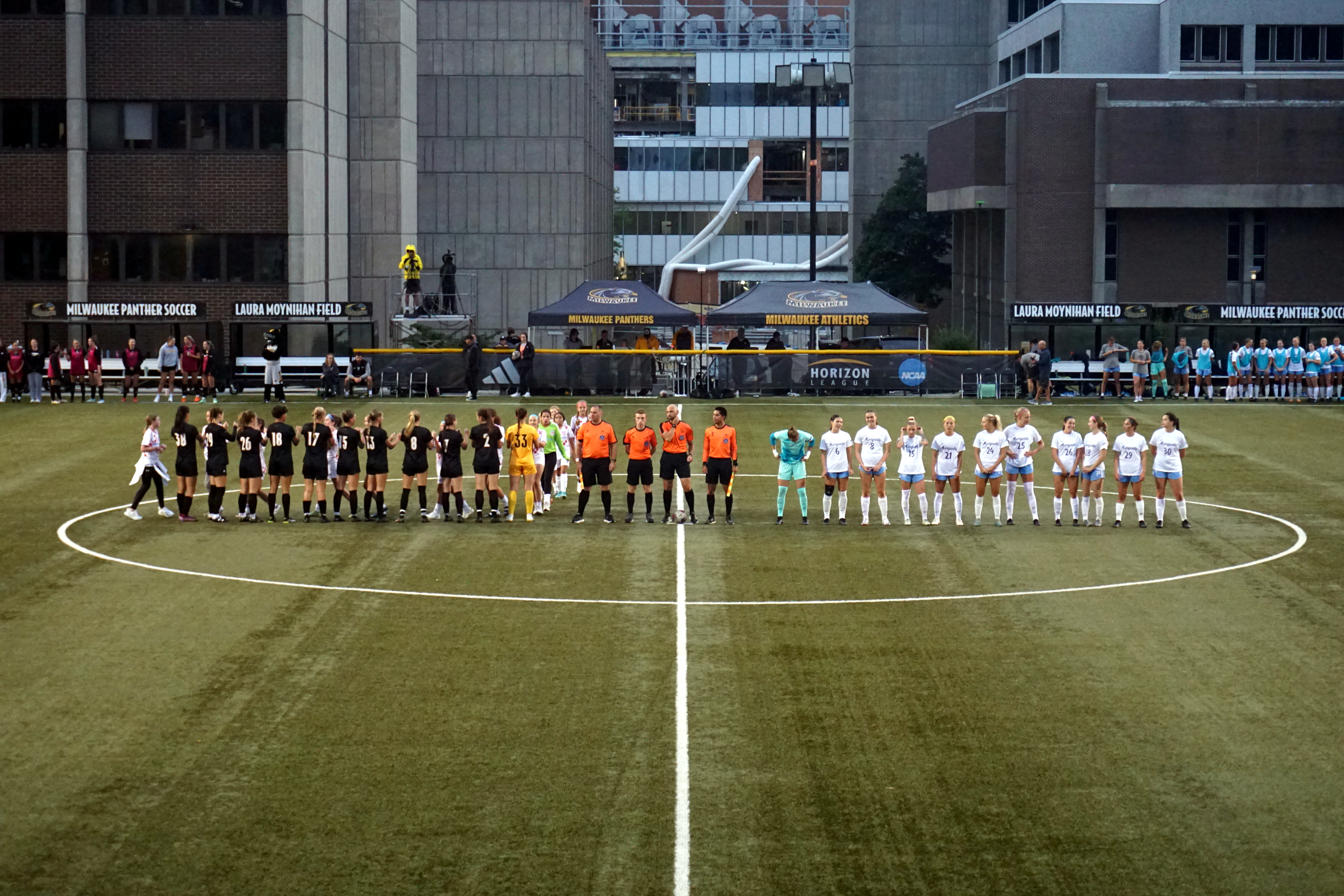
Milwaukee women's soccer team before game against Marquette.

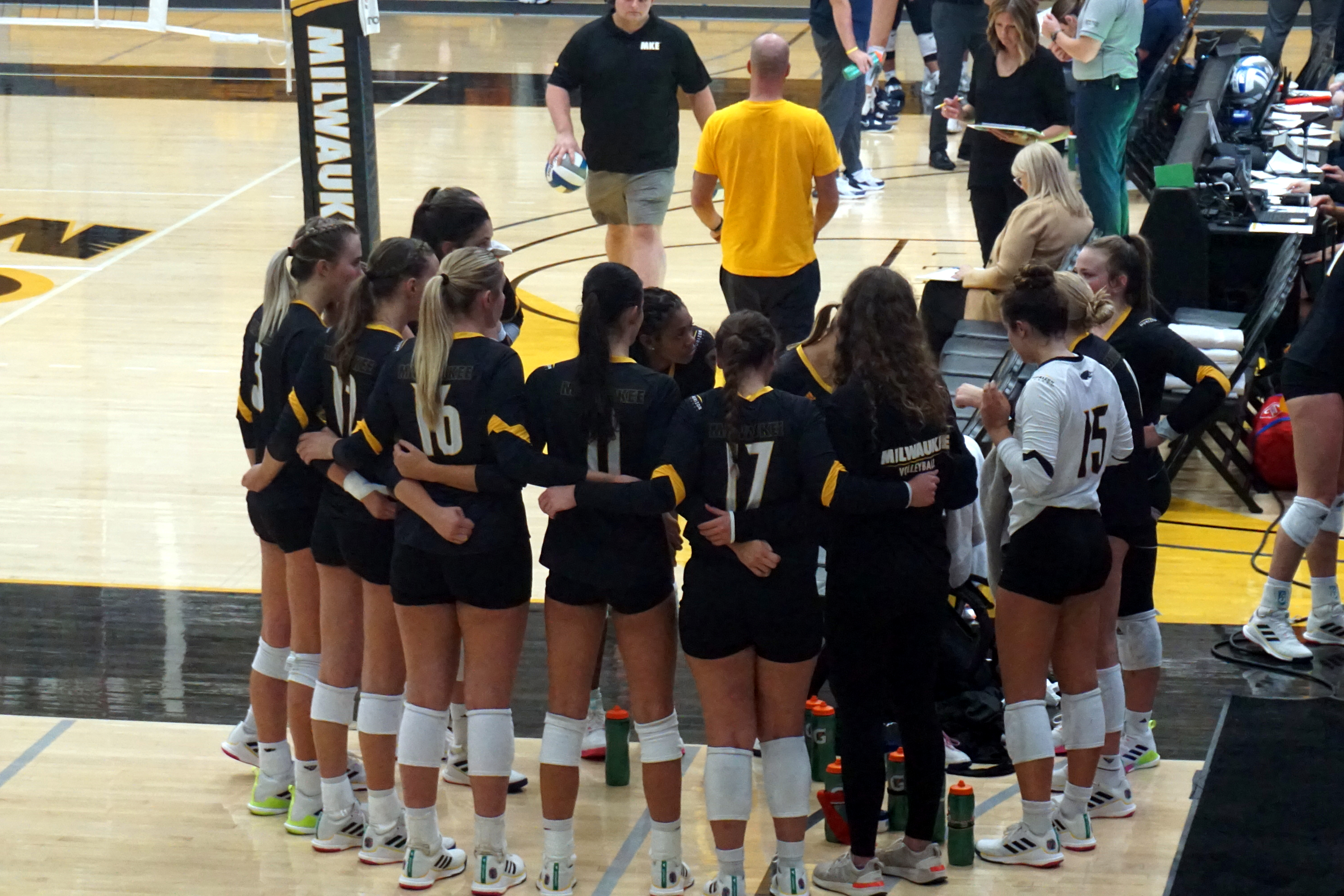
Milwaukee women's volleyball team in 2023.

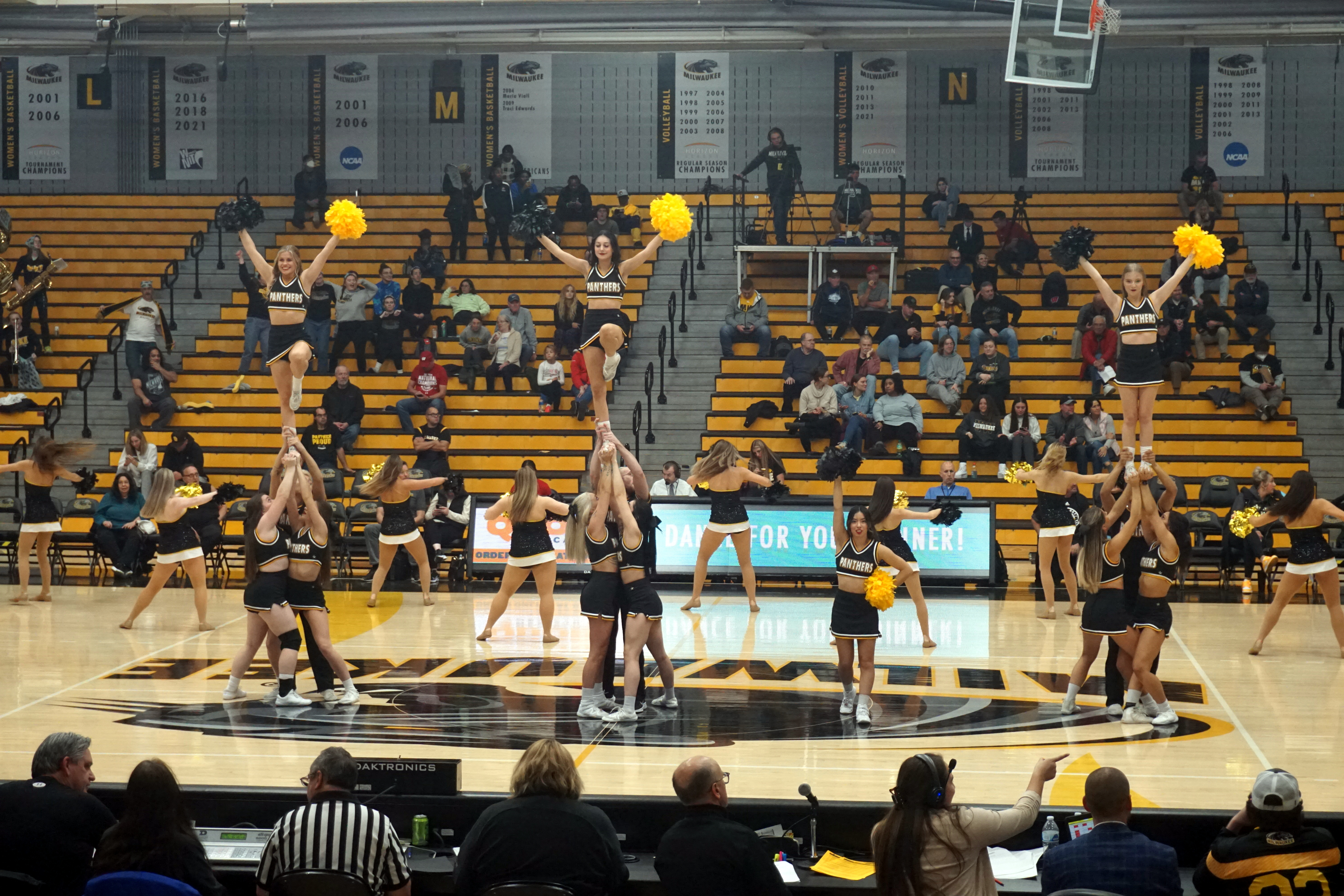
Milwaukee cheerleaders performing at a women's basketball game, 2022

== Athletic facilities ==
- UWM Panther Arena – men's basketball
- Klotsche Center – men's and women's basketball, volleyball, swimming and diving, indoor track and field
- Engelmann Stadium – men's and women's soccer
- Franklin Field – baseball
- River Glen Elite – women's tennis

== Notable people ==
=== Baseball ===
- Daulton Varsho (outfielder, currently plays for the Toronto Blue Jays)
- AJ Blubaugh (pitcher, currently plays for the Houston Astros)

=== Basketball ===
- Clay Tucker (shooting guard, professional player from 2003 to 2018)
- Bruce Weber (former head coach at Illinois and Kansas State, 2005 Naismith College Player of the Year)
- Von McDade (drafted by the New Jersey Nets in the second round of the 1991 NBA draft)
- Dylan Page (small forward, currently plays for CB Estudiantes)
- Joah Tucker (professional player from 2006 to 2012, former Harlem Globetrotters member)
- Chris Hill (point guard, professional player from 2006 to 2010)
- Ed McCants (professional player from 2006 to 2008)
- Patrick Baldwin Jr. (drafted by the Golden State Warriors in the first round of the 2022 NBA draft, currently playing for the Los Angeles Clippers)

=== Football ===
- Bill Carollo (National Football League official from 1989 to 2008, current director of officiating for the Big Ten Conference)
- Mike Reinfeldt (All-Pro safety for the Houston Oilers, played from 1975 to 1983)
- Demetrius Harris (basketball player at Milwaukee, professional tight end with four NFL teams from 2013 to 2021)

=== Soccer ===
- Jimmy Banks (member of the United States men's national soccer team from 1986 to 1991)
- Sasho Cirovski (current head soccer coach at Maryland)
- Tighe Dombrowski (drafted by the San Jose Earthquakes in the fifth round of the 2004 MLS SuperDraft)
- Logan Farrington (drafted third overall by FC Dallas in the 2024 MLS SuperDraft)
- Sarah Hagen (member of the United States U23 and senior national teams from 2010 to 2014)
- Manny Lagos (former MLS player from 1997 to 2005 and former US National team member)
- Tony Sanneh (professional player from 1996 to 2005, former USMNT member and manager of Minnesota United FC)

=== Athletic directors ===
- Herman Kluge (1956–1970)
- Albert Negratti (1970–1971)
- Thomas P. Rosandich (1972–1975)
- Jim Harding (1975–1980)
- Daniel I. Harris (associate director for Men's Athletics, 1980–1983)
- Daryl A. Leonard (associate director for Women's Athletics, 1980–1983)
- Daniel I. Harris (1983–1988)
- Bud Haidet (1988–2009)
- George Koonce (2009–2010)
- Dave Gilbert (interim, 2010)
- Rick Costello (2010–2012)
- Andy Geiger (interim, 2012–2013)
- Amanda Braun (2013–present)

== See also ==
- List of records of the Milwaukee Panthers
- List of college athletic programs in Wisconsin
