= 2002–03 Milwaukee Panthers men's basketball team =

American college basketball season

2002–03 Milwaukee Panthers men's basketball

Horizon League tournament champions

NCAA tournament, First Round
- Conference: Horizon League
- Record: 24–8 (13–3 Horizon)
- Head coach: Bruce Pearl (2nd season)
- Home arena: U.S. Cellular Arena; Klotsche Center

2002–03 Horizon League men's basketball standings
	Conf.				Overall
Team	W		L	PCT	W		L	PCT
Butler	14	–	2	.875	27	–	6	.818
Milwaukee †	13	–	3	.813	24	–	8	.750
Illinois-Chicago	12	–	4	.750	21	–	9	.700
Loyola Chicago	9	–	7	.563	15	–	16	.484
Detroit Mercy	9	–	7	.563	18	–	12	.600
Green Bay	4	–	12	.250	10	–	20	.333
Youngstown State	4	–	12	.250	9	–	20	.310
Wright State	4	–	12	.250	10	–	18	.357
Cleveland State	3	–	13	.188	8	–	22	.267
† 2003 Horizon League Tournament winner

The 2002–03 Milwaukee Panthers men's basketball team represented the University of Wisconsin–Milwaukee during the 2002–03 NCAA Division I men's basketball season. The Panthers, led by 2nd-year head coach Bruce Pearl, played their home games at the U.S. Cellular Arena and Klotsche Center and were members of the Horizon League. They finished the season 24–8, 13–3 in Horizon League play to finish in second place. They were champions of the Horizon League tournament to earn an automatic bid to the NCAA tournament where they received a No. 12 seed in the Midwest region. Their season ended after losing a one-point game to No. 5 seed Notre Dame in the opening round.

== Roster ==
2002–03 Milwaukee Panthers men's basketball team
Players
Coaches

Pos.	#	Name	Height	Weight	Year	Previous school	Hometown
G	2	Chris Hill	5 ft 10 in (1.78 m)	160 lb (73 kg)	Fr	Whitney Young	Chicago, Illinois
G	4	Mark Pancratz	6 ft 3 in (1.91 m)	185 lb (84 kg)	Fr	Schaumburg	Schaumburg, Illinois
F	15	Dylan Page	6 ft 9 in (2.06 m)	230 lb (104 kg)	Jr	Amherst	Amherst, Wisconsin
F	21	Jason McCoy	6 ft 9 in (2.06 m)	190 lb (86 kg)	Fr	Rutgers	Houston, Texas
G	22	Jose Winston	6 ft 0 in (1.83 m)	180 lb (82 kg)	Sr		Milwaukee, Wisconsin
F	23	James Wright	6 ft 6 in (1.98 m)	220 lb (100 kg)	So	Vincent	Milwaukee, Wisconsin
G	24	Boo Davis	6 ft 3 in (1.91 m)	190 lb (86 kg)	Fr	Olney CC	Chicago, Illinois
G	30	Clay Tucker	6 ft 4 in (1.93 m)	195 lb (88 kg)	Sr	Perry	Lima, Ohio
F	42	Rob Sanders	6 ft 7 in (2.01 m)	190 lb (86 kg)	So	Toledo	Toledo, Ohio
F	44	Adrian Tigert	6 ft 7 in (2.01 m)	240 lb (109 kg)	Fr	West	Oshkosh, Wisconsin
C	50	Derrick Ford	6 ft 10 in (2.08 m)	240 lb (109 kg)	Fr	Olney CC	Toledo, Ohio

Head coach

- Bruce Pearl

Assistant coach(es)

Legend

- (C) Team captain
- (S) Suspended
- (I) Ineligible
- (W) Walk-on
- Injured
- Current redshirt

Roster

== Schedule and results ==
Date time, TV	Rank^{#}	Opponent^{#}	Result	Record	Site city, state
Regular season
Nov 23, 2002*		at Wisconsin	L 72–83	0–1	Kohl Center (17,142); Madison, Wisconsin
Mar 1, 2003		at Butler	L 74–76	22–7 (13–3)	Hinkle Fieldhouse (11,043); Indianapolis, Indiana
Horizon League Tournament
Mar 8, 2003*		vs. Illinois-Chicago; Semifinals	W 75–73	23–7	U.S. Cellular Arena (7,411); Milwaukee, Wisconsin
Mar 11, 2003*		Butler; Championship game	W 69–52	24–7	U.S. Cellular Arena (10,115); Milwaukee, Wisconsin
NCAA Tournament
Mar 20, 2003*	(12 MW)	vs. (5 MW) No. 22 Notre Dame; First round	L 69–70	24–8	RCA Dome (21,250); Indianapolis, Indiana
*Non-conference game. ^{#}Rankings from AP poll. (#) Tournament seedings in parentheses. W=West.

== Awards and honors ==
- Bruce Pearl – Horizon League Coach of the Year
