= 1958 Milwaukee Cardinals football team =

American college football season

1958 Milwaukee Cardinals football
- Conference: Wisconsin State College Conference
- Record: 3–5 (1–5 WSCC)
- Head coach: Armin Kraeft (3rd season)
- Home stadium: Pearse Field

1958 Wisconsin State College Conference football standings
	Conf.					Overall
Team	W		L		T	W		L		T
River Falls State $	6	–	0	–	0	7	–	2	–	0
Stevens Point State	5	–	0	–	1	7	–	0	–	1
Oshkosh State	4	–	2	–	0	6	–	2	–	0
Whitewater State	4	–	2	–	0	5	–	3	–	0
La Crosse State	3	–	3	–	0	5	–	3	–	0
Eau Claire State	3	–	3	–	0	3	–	5	–	0
Platteville State	1	–	4	–	1	1	–	4	–	1
Milwaukee	1	–	5	–	0	3	–	5	–	0
Superior State	1	–	5	–	0	3	–	6	–	0
Stout State	1	–	5	–	0	1	–	7	–	0
$ – Conference champion; Stevens Point State beat River Falls State on September 18, but the game was not counted in the conference standings.

The 1958 Milwaukee Cardinals football team represented the University of Wisconsin–Milwaukee as a member of the Wisconsin State College Conference (WSCC) during the 1958 college football season. Led by Armin Kraeft in his third season as head coach, Milwaukee compiled a record of 3–5, with a record in conference of 1–5, and finished eighth in the WSCC.

== Schedule ==
Date	Opponent	Site	Result	Attendance	Source
September 20	Moorhead State*	Pearse Field; Milwaukee, WI	W 19–6		
September 27	at Oshkosh State	Memorial Field; Oshkosh, WI	L 0–22		
October 4	Stout State	Pearse Field; Milwaukee, WI	W 41–0		
October 11	Stevens Point State^{†}	Pearse Field; Milwaukee, WI	L 12–19	2,200	
October 18	at Platteville State	Legion Park; Platteville, WI	L 3–8		
October 25	Whitewater State	Pearse Field; Milwaukee, WI	L 6–18		
November 1	at La Crosse State	Memorial Field; La Crosse, WI	L 12–13		
November 8	at Ferris Institute*	Top Taggart Field; Big Rapids, MI	W 13–0		
*Non-conference game; ^{†}Homecoming; Source:
