= 1959 Milwaukee Cardinals football team =

American college football season

1959 Milwaukee Cardinals football
- Conference: Wisconsin State College Conference
- Record: 4–4 (3–3 WSCC)
- Head coach: Armin Kraeft (4th season)
- Home stadium: Pearse Field

1959 Wisconsin State College Conference football standings
	Conf.					Overall
Team	W		L		T	W		L		T
Whitewater State $	6	–	0	–	0	7	–	1	–	1
La Crosse State	5	–	1	–	0	8	–	1	–	0
Superior State	3	–	1	–	2	4	–	3	–	2
Stevens Point State	3	–	3	–	1	4	–	3	–	1
Milwaukee	3	–	3	–	0	4	–	4	–	0
Oshkosh State	2	–	3	–	2	3	–	3	–	2
Eau Claire State	2	–	4	–	1	2	–	5	–	1
River Falls State	2	–	4	–	1	2	–	6	–	1
Platteville State	2	–	4	–	0	2	–	6	–	0
Stout State	0	–	5	–	1	2	–	5	–	1
$ – Conference champion

The 1959 Milwaukee Cardinals football team represented the University of Wisconsin–Milwaukee as a member of the Wisconsin State College Conference (WSCC) during the 1959 college football season. Led by Armin Kraeft in his fourth season as head coach, Milwaukee compiled a record of 4–4, with a record in conference of 3–3, and finished fifth in the WSCC.

== Schedule ==
Date	Opponent	Site	Result	Source
September 19	Moorhead State*	Pearse Field; Milwaukee, WI	W 13–6	
September 26	Oshkosh State	Pearse Field; Milwaukee, WI	W 32–0	
October 3	at Stout State	Nelson Field; Menomonie, WI	W 13–12	
October 10	at Stevens Point State	Goerke Field; Stevens Point, WI	L 0–7	
October 17	Platteville State	Pearse Field; Milwaukee, WI	L 13–27	
October 26	at Whitewater State	Hamilton Field; Whitewater, WI	L 0–25	
October 31	La Crosse State	Pearse Field; Milwaukee, WI	W 16–7	
November 7	Northern Michigan*	Pearse Field; Milwaukee, WI	L 0–51	
*Non-conference game; Source:
