= List of records of the Milwaukee Panthers =

This article lists the history record of the Panthers at the University of Wisconsin–Milwaukee.

- From 1979–2001 the Horizon League was called the Midwestern Collegiate Conference.
- Panthers moved all sports to NCAA Division 1 in the 1990–91 school year.
- Men's soccer has been in NCAA Division I since 1973, men's basketball was in division 1 from 1973–1980 before moving back to Division III.
- In 2007 the Mid-Continent Conference changed its name to the Summit League.

== Men's Soccer ==
Milwaukee Panthers
Year	Conference (seed)	Record	Coach	Top 25	NCAA
2022	Horizon League (9)	1-8-8	Kris Kelderman		
2021 (Fall)	Horizon League (3)	9-8-1	Kris Kelderman		
2021 (Spring)	Horizon League (4)*	8-5	Kris Kelderman		1st Round
2019	Horizon League (6)	1-8-8	Kris Kelderman		
2018	Horizon League (6)	9-7-3	Kris Kelderman		
2017	Horizon League (3)	10-5-4	Kris Kelderman		
2016	Horizon League (2)	8-7-3	Kris Kelderman		
2015	Horizon League (8)	5-10-3	Kris Kelderman		
2014	Horizon League (6)	6-10-3	Kris Kelderman		
2013	Horizon League (2)*	15-3-2	Kris Kelderman		1st Round
2012	Horizon League (5)	8-8-2	Kris Kelderman		
2011	Horizon League (7)	6-10-2	Chris Whalley		
2010	Horizon League (6)	6-10-3	Chris Whalley		
2009	Horizon League (6)	3-13-2	Jon Coleman		
2008	Horizon League (7)	4-10-5	Jon Coleman		
2007	Horizon League (2)	5-12-3	Jon Coleman		
2006	Horizon League (3)	8-9-2	Jon Coleman		
2005	Horizon League (2)*	14-4-5	Louis Bennett	#24	2nd Round
2004	Horizon League (1)*	14-5-3	Louis Bennett	#24	2nd Round
2003	Horizon League (1)*	16-6-1	Louis Bennett		2nd Round
2002	Horizon League (1)*	19-2-1	Louis Bennett	#17	2nd Round
2001	Horizon League (1)	18-5	Louis Bennett		1st Round
2000	Horizon League (4)	12-8-1	Louis Bennett		
1999	Horizon League (2)	12-8-1	Louis Bennett		
1998	Horizon League (5)	5-13-1	Louis Bennett		
1997	Horizon League (1)	13-8-1	Louis Bennett		
1996	Horizon League (2)	13-4-3	Louis Bennett		
1995	Horizon League (4)	15-6	Brian Tompkins		
1994	Horizon League (2)	14-8-1	Brian Tompkins		
1993	Summit League (1)	14-4-2	Brian Tompkins		
1992	Independent	6-9-3	Brian Tompkins		
1991	Independent	13-5	Brian Tompkins		
1990	Big Central Soccer Conference (1)	16-4-2	Brian Tompkins		1st Round
1989	Big Central Soccer Conference (1)	12-5-3	Brian Tompkins		
1988	Big Central Soccer Conference/WISL (3) (2)	9-12	Bob Gansler		
1987	Big Central Soccer Conference/WISL (3) (1)	11-8-2	Bob Gansler		
1986	Wisconsin Intercollegiate Soccer League (1)	10-8-2	Bob Gansler		
1985	Wisconsin Intercollegiate Soccer League (1)	14-5-1	Bob Gansler		
1984	Wisconsin Intercollegiate Soccer League (3)	10-6-3	Bob Gansler		
1983	Wisconsin Intercollegiate Soccer League (4)	9-8-1	Dan Harris		
1982	Independent	5-14-2	Dan Harris		
1981	Independent	12-8	Dan Harris		
1980	Independent	13-4-3	Dan Harris		1st Round
1979	Independent	15-3-4	Dan Harris		1st Round
1978	Independent	12-8	Dan Harris		
1977	Independent	14-4	Dan Harris		
1976	Independent	4-9-2	Dan Harris		
1975	Independent	11-4	Dan Harris		
1974	Independent	8-2-3	Dan Harris		
1973	Independent	6-6	Dan Harris		

- * Won Conference Tournament (2013, 2005, 2004, 2003, 2002)

== Football ==
- See List of Milwaukee Panthers football seasons

== Women's Soccer ==
Milwaukee Panthers
Year	Conference (seed)	Record	Coach	Top 25	NCAA
2022	Horizon League (1)*	12-4-3	Kevin Boyd		1st Round (L, 2-3 Michigan State)
2021	Horizon League (1)*	19-2	Kevin Boyd		1st Round (W, 1-0 Xavier); 2nd Round(L, 0-1 Virginia)
2020	Horizon League (2)	9-2-1	Troy Fabiano		1st Round (W, 1-0 Elon); 2nd Round(L, 0-3 Florida State)
2019	Horizon League (1)*	17-2-1	Troy Fabiano		1st Round (L, 0-1 Wisconsin)
2018	Horizon League (1)*	16-2-1	Troy Fabiano		1st Round (L, 0-4 Santa Clara)
2017	Horizon League (1)	16-0-4	Troy Fabiano		
2016	Horizon League (1)	13-5-2	Troy Fabiano		
2015	Horizon League (1)	11-3-4	Greg Henschel		
2014	Horizon League (8)	6-10-2	Greg Henschel		
2013	Horizon League (1)*	10-9-1	Greg Henschel		1st Round (L, 0-4 Michigan)
2012	Horizon League (1)*	8-9-1	Greg Henschel		1st Round (L, 1-3 Notre Dame)
2011	Horizon League (1)*	19-3	Michael Moynihan	#23	1st Round (W, 3-0 Illinois State); 2nd Round (L, 1-2 Ohio State)
2010	Horizon League (2)*	12-7-2	Michael Moynihan		1st Round (L, 1-2 Wisconsin)
2009	Horizon League (1)*	12-5-3	Michael Moynihan		1st Round (L, 0-3 UCF)
2008	Horizon League (2)*	18-3-2	Michael Moynihan	#24	1st Round (L, 1-2 Michigan State)
2007	Horizon League (1)	13-4-4	Michael Moynihan		
2006	Horizon League (1)	16-4-2	Michael Moynihan		1st Round (T, 0-02OT Michigan); 2nd Round (L, 0-1 Notre Dame)
2005	Horizon League (1)*	12-5-5	Michael Moynihan		1st Round (T, 0-02OT Purdue); 2nd Round (L, 0-1 Marquette)
2004	Horizon League (1)	11-8-3	Michael Moynihan		
2003	Horizon League (1)	9-9-1	Michael Moynihan		
2002	Horizon League (1)*	11-6-5	Michael Moynihan		1st Round (L, 0-2 Pepperdine)
2001	Horizon League (1)*	15-5	Michael Moynihan		1st Round (L, 0-12OT Dartmouth)
2000	Horizon League (1)	11-8-1	Michael Moynihan		
1999	Horizon League (3)	11-8-3	Michael Moynihan		
1998	Horizon League (4)	10-5-3	Michael Moynihan		
1997	Horizon League (1)*	13-3-4	Michael Moynihan		1st Round (L, 1-2 Minnesota)
1996	Horizon League (4)	11-8	Susan Moynihan		
1995	Horizon League (4)	9-9-1	Susan Moynihan		
1994	Horizon League (2)	12-7-1	Susan Moynihan		
1993	Independent	8-9-2	Susan Moynihan		
1992	Independent	6-10-1	Susan Moynihan		
1991	Independent	6-10-1	Laura Moynihan		
1990	Independent	6-9-2	Pete Knezic		

- * Won Conference Tournament (2022, 2021, 2019, 2018, 2013, 2012, 2011, 2010, 2009, 2008, 2005, 2002, 2001, 1997)
