= 2003 Horizon League men's basketball tournament =

Basketball tournament

- Classification: Division I
- Season: 2002–03
- Teams: 9
- First round site: campus sites
- Quarterfinals site: U.S. Cellular Arena; Milwaukee, Wisconsin
- Semifinals site: U.S. Cellular Arena; Milwaukee, Wisconsin
- Finals site: U.S. Cellular Arena; Milwaukee, Wisconsin
- Champions: Milwaukee (1st title)
- Winning coach: Bruce Pearl (1st title)
- MVP: Clay Tucker (Milwaukee)

2002–03 Horizon League men's basketball standings
	Conf.				Overall
Team	W		L	PCT	W		L	PCT
Butler	14	–	2	.875	27	–	6	.818
Milwaukee †	13	–	3	.813	24	–	8	.750
Illinois-Chicago	12	–	4	.750	21	–	9	.700
Loyola Chicago	9	–	7	.563	15	–	16	.484
Detroit Mercy	9	–	7	.563	18	–	12	.600
Green Bay	4	–	12	.250	10	–	20	.333
Youngstown State	4	–	12	.250	9	–	20	.310
Wright State	4	–	12	.250	10	–	18	.357
Cleveland State	3	–	13	.188	8	–	22	.267
† 2003 Horizon League Tournament winner

The 2003 Horizon League men's basketball tournament took place at the end of the 2002–03 regular season. The better seed hosted each first round match. Milwaukee hosted the second round, semifinals, and championship game.

== Seeds ==
All Horizon League schools played in the tournament. Teams were seeded by 2002–03 Horizon League season record, with a tiebreaker system to seed teams with identical conference records. The top 2 teams received a bye to the semifinals and the third seed received a bye to the quarterfinals.

== Bracket ==
First round Tuesday, March 4
4	Loyola	69
9	Cleveland State	57
5	Detroit	78
8	Wright State	61
6	Green Bay	61
7	Youngstown State	65

Second round Friday, March 7
4	Loyola	84
5	Detroit	98
3	UIC	79
7	Youngstown State	59

Semifinals; Saturday, March 8
1	Butler	58
5	Detroit	55
2	Milwaukee	75
3	UIC	73

Championship; Tuesday, March 11
1	Butler	52
2	Milwaukee	69

First round games at campus sites of higher seeds
Second round and semifinals hosted by the top seed. Championship hosted by best remaining seed
