= 2004–05 Milwaukee Panthers men's basketball team =

American college basketball season

2004–05 Milwaukee Panthers men's basketball

Horizon League Regular season and tournament champions

NCAA tournament, Sweet Sixteen
- Conference: Horizon League

Ranking
- Coaches: No. 23
- Record: 26–6 (14–2 Horizon)
- Head coach: Bruce Pearl (4th season)
- Home arena: U.S. Cellular Arena; Klotsche Center

2004–05 Horizon League men's basketball standings
	Conf.				Overall
Team	W		L	PCT	W		L	PCT
Milwaukee †	14	–	2	.875	26	–	6	.813
Green Bay	10	–	6	.625	17	–	11	.607
Detroit	9	–	7	.563	14	–	16	.467
Loyola Chicago	8	–	8	.500	13	–	17	.433
Illinois-Chicago	8	–	8	.500	15	–	14	.517
Wright State	8	–	8	.500	15	–	15	.500
Butler	7	–	9	.438	13	–	15	.464
Cleveland State	6	–	10	.375	9	–	17	.346
Youngstown State	2	–	14	.125	5	–	23	.179
† 2005 Horizon League Tournament winner

The 2004–05 Milwaukee Panthers men's basketball team represented the University of Wisconsin–Milwaukee during the 2004–05 NCAA Division I men's basketball season. The Panthers, led by head coach Bruce Pearl, played their home games at the U.S. Cellular Arena and Klotsche Center and were members of the Horizon League. They finished the season 26–6, 14–2 in Horizon League play to finish in first place. They were champions of the Horizon League tournament to earn an automatic bid to the NCAA tournament where they received a #12 seed and defeated No. 5 seed Alabama and No. 4 seed Boston College to reach their 1st Sweet 16 in school history. Their season ended after losing to the eventual National runner-up and No. 1 overall seed Illinois.

== Roster ==
2004–05 Milwaukee Panthers men's basketball team
Players
Coaches

Pos.	#	Name	Height	Weight	Year	Previous school	Hometown
G	2	Chris Hill	5 ft 10 in (1.78 m)	160 lb (73 kg)	Jr	Whitney Young	Chicago, Illinois
G	4	Mark Pancratz	6 ft 3 in (1.91 m)	185 lb (84 kg)	Jr	Schaumburg	Schaumburg, Illinois
G	12	Allan Hanson	6 ft 0 in (1.83 m)	170 lb (77 kg)	Fr	East	Wauwatosa, Wisconsin
F	13	Joah Tucker	6 ft 5 in (1.96 m)	220 lb (100 kg)	Jr	Bradley	Milwaukee, Wisconsin
G	14	Derrick Wimmer	6 ft 4 in (1.93 m)	175 lb (79 kg)	So	Chicago State	Milwaukee, Wisconsin
G	20	Myles McKay	6 ft 3 in (1.91 m)	180 lb (82 kg)	Fr	Menomonee Falls	Menomonee Falls, Wisconsin
F	21	Jason McCoy	6 ft 9 in (2.06 m)	190 lb (86 kg)	Jr	Rutgers	Houston, Texas
G	22	Ed McCants	6 ft 3 in (1.91 m)	200 lb (91 kg)	Sr	Paris JC	Marion, Ohio
F	23	James Wright	6 ft 6 in (1.98 m)	220 lb (100 kg)	Sr	Vincent	Milwaukee, Wisconsin
G	24	Boo Davis	6 ft 3 in (1.91 m)	190 lb (86 kg)	Jr	Olney CC	Chicago, Illinois
G	32	Luke Homan	6 ft 3 in (1.91 m)	180 lb (82 kg)	So	Central	Brookfield, Wisconsin
G	33	Nick Hansen	6 ft 5 in (1.96 m)	200 lb (91 kg)	So	West	Appleton, Wisconsin
F	40	Michael Bendall	6 ft 7 in (2.01 m)	210 lb (95 kg)	Fr	Oconomowoc	Oconomowoc, Wisconsin
F	42	Rob Sanders	6 ft 7 in (2.01 m)	190 lb (86 kg)	Sr	Toledo	Toledo, Ohio
C	43	Steve Hoelzel	6 ft 9 in (2.06 m)	225 lb (102 kg)	Fr	Michigan Tech	Kaukauna, Wisconsin
F	44	Adrian Tigert	6 ft 7 in (2.01 m)	240 lb (109 kg)	Jr	West	Oshkosh, Wisconsin
C	50	Derrick Ford	6 ft 10 in (2.08 m)	240 lb (109 kg)	Jr	Olney CC	Toledo, Ohio

Head coach

- Bruce Pearl

Assistant coach(es)

Legend

- (C) Team captain
- (S) Suspended
- (I) Ineligible
- (W) Walk-on
- Injured
- Current redshirt

Roster

== Schedule and results ==
Date time, TV	Rank^{#}	Opponent^{#}	Result	Record	Site city, state
Exhibition
Nov 10, 2004*		Lawrence	W 89–55		U.S. Cellular Arena; Milwaukee, Wisconsin
Regular season
Nov 20, 2004*		Prairie View	W 117–55	1–0	U.S. Cellular Arena (3,278); Milwaukee, Wisconsin
Nov 23, 2004*		Wisconsin–Parkside	W 87–50	2–0	U.S. Cellular Arena (3,352); Milwaukee, Wisconsin
Nov 28, 2004*		Air Force	W 50–45	3–0	U.S. Cellular Arena (4,120); Milwaukee, Wisconsin
Dec 1, 2004*		South Dakota State	W 89–54	4–0	U.S. Cellular Arena (3,053); Milwaukee, Wisconsin
Dec 4, 2004		at Illinois-Chicago	W 75–67	5–0 (1–0)	UIC Pavilion (6,004); Chicago, Illinois
Dec 7, 2004*		at Saint Louis	W 57–47	6–0	Scottrade Center (7,202); St. Louis, Missouri
Dec 11, 2004*		at Valparaiso	L 71–72	6–1	Athletics-Recreation Center (4,242); Valparaiso, Indiana
Dec 15, 2004*		at Wisconsin	L 37–66	6–2	Kohl Center (17,142); Madison, Wisconsin
Dec 22, 2004*		vs. No. 2 Kansas; Yellow Book Shootout	L 62–73	6–3	Kemper Arena (17,843); Kansas City, Missouri
Dec 30, 2004*		at Manhattan	W 88–78 ^{OT}	7–3	Draddy Gymnasium (2,482); New York, New York
Jan 3, 2005		Detroit	L 68–76	7–4 (1–1)	U.S. Cellular Arena (3,355); Milwaukee, Wisconsin
Jan 6, 2005		at Butler	W 71–68 ^{OT}	8–4 (2–1)	Hinkle Fieldhouse (4,143); Indianapolis, Indiana
Jan 8, 2005		Loyola–Chicago	W 73–56	9–4 (3–1)	U.S. Cellular Arena (4,632); Milwaukee, Wisconsin
Jan 12, 2005		at Youngstown State	W 65–42	10–4 (4–1)	Beeghly Center (2,793); Youngstown, Ohio
Jan 15, 2005		Green Bay	W 86–56	11–4 (5–1)	U.S. Cellular Arena (5,212); Milwaukee, Wisconsin
Jan 17, 2005		Wright State	W 71–66	12–4 (6–1)	U.S. Cellular Arena (2,831); Milwaukee, Wisconsin
Jan 20, 2005		Cleveland State	W 85–65	13–4 (7–1)	U.S. Cellular Arena (3,689); Milwaukee, Wisconsin
Jan 22, 2005		at Detroit	W 61–48	14–4 (8–1)	Calihan Hall (1,240); Detroit, Michigan
Jan 26, 2005*		at Purdue	W 73–68	15–4	Mackey Arena (11,278); West Lafayette, Indiana
Jan 29, 2005		at Green Bay	L 72–76	15–5 (8–2)	Resch Center (8,072); Ashwaubenon, Wisconsin
Feb 2, 2005		at Wright State	W 79–70	16–5 (9–2)	Ervin J. Nutter Center (4,134); Fairborn, Ohio
Feb 5, 2005		Illinois-Chicago	W 85–75	17–5 (10–2)	U.S. Cellular Arena (6,041); Milwaukee, Wisconsin
Feb 10, 2005		at Loyola–Chicago	W 74–67	18–5 (11–2)	Joseph J. Gentile Center (2,682); Chicago, Illinois
Feb 12, 2005		Youngstown State	W 90–67	19–5 (12–2)	U.S. Cellular Arena (6,455); Milwaukee, Wisconsin
Feb 16, 2005		Butler	W 64–53	20–5 (13–2)	U.S. Cellular Arena (5,469); Milwaukee, Wisconsin
Feb 19, 2005*		at Hawaii	W 87–81	21–5	Stan Sheriff Center (8,024); Honolulu, Hawaii
Feb 26, 2005		at Cleveland State	W 81–59	22–5 (14–2)	Henry J. Goodman Arena (3,461); Cleveland, Ohio
Horizon League Tournament
Mar 5, 2005*		Loyola–Chicago; Semifinals	W 94–76	23–5	U.S. Cellular Arena (8,653); Milwaukee, Wisconsin
Mar 8, 2005*		Detroit; Championship game	W 59–58	24–5	U.S. Cellular Arena (10,783); Milwaukee, Wisconsin
NCAA Tournament
Mar 17, 2005*	(12 CHI)	vs. (5 CHI) No. 21 Alabama; First round	W 83–73	25–5	Henry J. Goodman Arena (13,222); Cleveland, Ohio
Mar 19, 2005*	(12 CHI)	vs. (4 CHI) No. 14 Boston College; Second Round	W 83–75	26–5	Henry J. Goodman Arena (13,332); Cleveland, Ohio
Mar 24, 2005*	(12 CHI)	vs. (1 CHI) No. 1 Illinois; Regional semifinal – Sweet Sixteen	L 63–77	26–6	Allstate Arena (16,957); Rosemont, Illinois
*Non-conference game. ^{#}Rankings from AP poll. (#) Tournament seedings in parentheses. CHI=Chicago.

=== 2005 Horizon League Tournament ===
First round Tuesday, March 1
Loyola	78
Youngstown State	75
UIC	84
Cleveland State	65
Wright State	61
Butler	57

Second Round; Friday, March 4
Loyola (OT)	87
UIC	81
Detroit	61
Wright State	48

Semifinals; Saturday, March 5
Milwaukee	94
Loyola	76
Green Bay	55
Detroit	61

Championship; Tuesday, March 8
Milwaukee	59
Detroit	58

First round games at campus sites of higher seeds
Second round and semifinals hosted by the top seed. Championship hosted by best remaining seed

== Awards and honors ==
- Ed McCants – Horizon League Player of the Year
- Bruce Pearl – Horizon League Coach of the Year
