= 2005 Horizon League men's basketball tournament =

- Classification: Division I
- Season: 2004–05
- Teams: 9
- First round site: campus sites
- Quarterfinals site: U.S. Cellular Arena; Milwaukee, Wisconsin
- Semifinals site: U.S. Cellular Arena; Milwaukee, Wisconsin
- Finals site: U.S. Cellular Arena; Milwaukee, Wisconsin
- Champions: Milwaukee (2nd title)
- Winning coach: Bruce Pearl (2nd title)
- MVP: Joah Tucker (Milwaukee)

2004–05 Horizon League men's basketball standings
	Conf.				Overall
Team	W		L	PCT	W		L	PCT
Milwaukee †	14	–	2	.875	26	–	6	.813
Green Bay	10	–	6	.625	17	–	11	.607
Detroit	9	–	7	.563	14	–	16	.467
Loyola Chicago	8	–	8	.500	13	–	17	.433
Illinois-Chicago	8	–	8	.500	15	–	14	.517
Wright State	8	–	8	.500	15	–	15	.500
Butler	7	–	9	.438	13	–	15	.464
Cleveland State	6	–	10	.375	9	–	17	.346
Youngstown State	2	–	14	.125	5	–	23	.179
† 2005 Horizon League Tournament winner

The 2005 Horizon League men's basketball tournament took place at the end of the 2004–05 regular season. The better seed hosted each first round match. Milwaukee hosted the second round and semifinals, because they were the top seed overall, as well as the final because they were the highest remaining seed.

== Seeds ==
All Horizon League schools played in the tournament. Teams were seeded by 2004–05 Horizon League season record, with a tiebreaker system to seed teams with identical conference records. The top 2 teams received a bye to the semifinals and the third seed received a bye to the quarterfinals.

== Bracket ==
First Round; Tuesday, March 1
4	Loyola	78
9	Youngstown State	75
5	UIC	84
8	Cleveland State	65
6	Wright State	61
7	Butler	57

Second Round; Friday, March 4
4	Loyola (OT)	87
5	UIC	81
3	Detroit	61
6	Wright State	48

Semifinals; Saturday, March 5
1	Milwaukee	94
4	Loyola	76
2	Green Bay	55
3	Detroit	61

Championship; Tuesday, March 8
1	Milwaukee	59
3	Detroit	58

First round games at campus sites of higher seeds
Second round and semifinals hosted by the top seed. Championship hosted by best remaining seed
