= List of Milwaukee Panthers football seasons =

This is a list of seasons completed by the Milwaukee Panthers football team of the National Collegiate Athletic Association. The Milwaukee Panthers fielded their first team in 1956 coached by Armin Kraeft. They were previously members of the Wisconsin Intercollegiate Athletic Conference.

== Seasons ==
Legend

^{†} National Champions
^{‡} Conference Champions
^{#} Division Champions
^ Bowl game berth
* Playoff berth

Season	Conference	Coach	Conference Results				Season Results			Bowl/Playoff result	Final Ranking	
Season	Conference	Coach	Finish	Wins	Losses	Ties	Wins	Losses	Ties	Bowl/Playoff result	AP	Coaches'
Milwaukee Panthers
1956	WSUC	Armin Kraeft	T–9th/ of 10	0	5	0	0	8	0	—	—	—
1957	WSUC	Armin Kraeft	10th/ of 10	1	4	0	2	6	0	—	—	—
1958	WSUC	Armin Kraeft	8th/ of 10	1	5	0	3	5	0	—	—	—
1959	WSUC	Armin Kraeft	5th/ of 10	3	3	0	4	4	0	—	—	—
1960	WSUC	Wally Dreyer	7th/ of 10	2	4	0	2	6	0	—	—	—
1961	WSUC	Wally Dreyer	T–9th/ of 10	2	4	0	2	6	0	—	—	—
1962	WSUC	Wally Dreyer	T–7th/ of 10	2	4	0	2	6	0	—	—	—
1963	WSUC	Wally Dreyer	8th/ of 10	1	4	1	1	6	1	—	—	—
1964	Independent	Wally Dreyer	—	—	—	—	4	5	0	—	—	—
1965	Independent	Wally Dreyer	—	—	—	—	2	6	0	—	—	—
1966	Independent	Wally Dreyer	—	—	—	—	4	5	1	—	—	—
1967	Independent	Wally Dreyer	—	—	—	—	3	6	0	—	—	—
1968	Independent	Wally Dreyer	—	—	—	—	2	7	0	—	—	—
1969	Independent	Wally Dreyer	—	—	—	—	3	6	0	—	—	—
1970	Independent	Jerry Golembiewski	—	—	—	—	1	9	0	—	—	—
1971	Independent	Jerry Fishbain	—	—	—	—	5	5	0	—	—	—
1972	Independent	Jerry Fishbain	—	—	—	—	6	4	0	—	—	—
1973	D-II Independent	Glenn Brady	—	—	—	—	6	4	1	—	—	—
1974	D-II Independent	Glenn Brady	—	—	—	—	4	6	0	—	—	—
Total				12	33	1	56	110	3	(only includes regular season games)		
Total				—	—	—	—	—	—	(only includes bowl games; 0 appearances)		
Total				—	—	—	—	—	—	(only includes playoff games; 0 appearances)		
Total				12	33	1	56	110	3	(all games)		
♦ Denotes a tie for first place and conference co-champion
