= Amanda Braun =

American basketball player

Current position
- Title: Athletic director
- Team: Milwaukee
- Conference: Horizon League

Biographical details
- Education: Siena College

Playing career
- 1991–1995: Siena

Administrative career (AD unless noted)
- 1999–2006: Green Bay (associate AD)
- 2006–2013: Northeastern (associate AD)
- 2013–present: Milwaukee

Amanda Braun is the current director of athletics for the University of Wisconsin–Milwaukee. She previously served as associate athletic director for the University of Wisconsin–Green Bay from 1999 to 2006, and as associate athletic director for Northeastern University from 2006 to 2013. Braun attended college at Siena College, where she played on the Siena Saints women's basketball team. She graduated from Siena College with a bachelor's degree in 1995, and from the University of North Carolina at Chapel Hill with a master's degree in 1999. Braun was named athletic director at the University of Wisconsin–Milwaukee on March 4, 2013.
