= 2004–05 Wright State Raiders men's basketball team =

American college basketball season

2004–05 Wright State Raiders men's basketball
- Conference: Horizon League
- Record: 15–15 (8–8 Horizon League)
- Head coach: Paul Biancardi (2nd season)
- Assistant coaches: Larry Greer; Ed Huckaby; Brian Donoher
- Home arena: Nutter Center

2004–05 Horizon League men's basketball standings
	Conf.				Overall
Team	W		L	PCT	W		L	PCT
Milwaukee †	14	–	2	.875	26	–	6	.813
Green Bay	10	–	6	.625	17	–	11	.607
Detroit	9	–	7	.563	14	–	16	.467
Loyola Chicago	8	–	8	.500	13	–	17	.433
Illinois-Chicago	8	–	8	.500	15	–	14	.517
Wright State	8	–	8	.500	15	–	15	.500
Butler	7	–	9	.438	13	–	15	.464
Cleveland State	6	–	10	.375	9	–	17	.346
Youngstown State	2	–	14	.125	5	–	23	.179
† 2005 Horizon League Tournament winner

The 2004–05 Wright State Raiders men's basketball team represented Wright State University in the 2004–05 NCAA Division I men's basketball season led by head coach Paul Biancardi.

== Season summary ==
It was a competitive season of Horizon League basketball. In the nine team league, only three teams would finish with a winning record, and only Milwaukee separated from the pack. Wright State finished in a three-way tie for fourth at 8-8. A season of lifting wins and sinking losses. 2004-05 had the excitement of watching Zach Williams play for the Raiders, as well as watching DaShaun Wood, Drew Burleson and Zakee Boyd continue their development. Freshmen Spencer and Pleiman were relied on heavily and rose to the occasion. In the end a season of development, but the Raiders lacked the experience and depth to compete for the league title.

The tournament provided a bright memory to finish the year with the Wright State Raiders beating their nemesis, the Butler Bulldogs, at the Nutter Center in the opening round.

== Roster Changes ==
=== Joining ===
Spencer Everett

- Jordan Pleiman a 6' 8" forward recruited from Fort Loramie.
- Lorenzo Shine a guard from Detroit Rogers High School.
- Parysh Munroe from Freeport, Bahamas by way of Massanuten Military Academy.
- Jaron Taylor a transfer from Catonsville Community College.
- Kimo Brown walked on after playing for Victor Valley Junior College.
- Scott Wilson will red shirt after transferring from Cincinnati State.

=== Leaving ===
- Vova Severosa suddenly left the team in early December after it appeared that Jordan Pleiman had moved ahead of him in the rotation.

== Roster ==
2004–05 Wright State Raiders men's basketball team
Players
Coaches

Pos.	#	Name	Height	Weight	Year	Previous school	Hometown
F	22	Zach Williams	6 ft 7 in (2.01 m)	240 lb (109 kg)	RS Sr	Christ The King	Brooklyn, NY
G	11	Jaron Taylor	6 ft 2 in (1.88 m)	185 lb (84 kg)	Jr	Catonsville C.C.	Baltimore, MD
G	1	DaShaun Wood	5 ft 11 in (1.8 m)	160 lb (73 kg)	So	Crockett	Detroit, MI
F	4	Drew Burleson	6 ft 7 in (2.01 m)	225 lb (102 kg)	So	Wheelersburg	Wheelersburg, OH
F	33	Zakee Boyd	6 ft 5 in (1.96 m)	190 lb (86 kg)	So	Lutheran Prep	Newark, NJ
F	12	Vova Severosa	6 ft 8 in (2.03 m)	230 lb (104 kg)	So	Birmingham Groves	Vilnius, Lithuania
G	23	Everett Spencer	6 ft 6 in (1.98 m)	180 lb (82 kg)	Fr	New Creations	Columbus, OH
F	50	Jordan Pleiman	6 ft 8 in (2.03 m)	220 lb (100 kg)	Fr	Fort Loramie	Fort Loramie, OH
G	10	Lorenzo Shine	6 ft 2 in (1.88 m)	185 lb (84 kg)	Fr	Rogers	Detroit, MI
F	23	Parysh Munroe	6 ft 7 in (2.01 m)	230 lb (104 kg)	Fr	Massanutten	Freeport, Bahamas
G	24	Kimo Brown	6 ft 1 in (1.85 m)	181 lb (82 kg)	Fr	Victor Valley J.C.	Victorville, California
G	40	Mitchell Goldschmidt	6 ft 2 in (1.88 m)	—	Fr	Fort Loramie	Fort Loramie, OH
F	2	Scott Wilson (redshirt)	6 ft 7 in (2.01 m)	210 lb (95 kg)	So	Cincinnati State CC	Middletown, OH
G	2	William Graham (redshirt)	6 ft 3 in (1.91 m)	180 lb (82 kg)	Fr	Catholic	Lexington, KY

Head coach

- Paul Biancardi

Assistant coach(es)

Larry Greer, Ed Huckaby, Brian Donoher

Legend

- (C) Team captain
- (S) Suspended
- (I) Ineligible
- (W) Walk-on
- Injured
- Current redshirt

== Schedule and results ==
Date time, TV	Rank^{#}	Opponent^{#}	Result	Record	Site city, state
Nov 16, 2004*		at Tulsa; Cisco Systems Preseason NIT	W 72-66 ^{OT}	1-0	Reynolds Center (5,615); Tulsa, OK
Nov 18, 2004*		at No. 10 Arizona; Cisco Systems Preseason NIT	L 66-83	1-1	McKale Center (14,529); Tucson, AZ
Nov 21, 2004*		Brown	W 67-44	2–1	Nutter Center (3,591); Fairborn, OH
Nov 27, 2004*		Toledo	W 74-64	3–1	Nutter Center (4,191); Fairborn, OH
Dec 1, 2004*		at Ball State	L 54-61	3–2	University Arena (5,279); Muncie, IN
Dec 4, 2004*		at Northeastern	W 59-53	4–2	Matthews Arena (1,704); Boston, MA
Dec 8, 2003*		Miami Ohio	L 54-59 ^{OT}	4–3	Nutter Center (9,808); Fairborn, OH
Dec 11, 2004*		Akron	L 70-81	4-4	Nutter Center (3,630); Fairborn, OH
Dec 14, 2004*		at Southern Illinois	L 42-54	4-5	SIU Arena (5,188); Carbondale, IL
Dec 18, 2004		Youngstown State	W 72-51	5-5 (1–0)	Nutter Center (3,680); Fairborn, OH
Dec 22, 2004*		at Texas-Pan American	L 59-77	5–6	UTRGV Fieldhouse (1,635); Edinburg, TX
Dec 30, 2004*		Morgan State	W 70-52	6–6	Nutter Center (3,640); Fairborn, OH
Jan 3, 2005		at Green Bay	L 71-73 ^{OT}	6-7 (1–1)	Resch Center (4,520); Ashwaubenon, WI
Jan 6, 2005		Cleveland State	W 73-57	7-7 (2–1)	Nutter Center (6,954); Fairborn, OH
Jan 8, 2005		Detroit Mercy	W 63–57	8-7 (3-1)	Nutter Center (5,075); Fairborn, OH
Jan 15, 2005		at Loyola	L 51-65	8-8 (3–2)	Gentile Event Center (1,821); Chicago, IL
Jan 17, 2005		at Milwaukee	L 66-71	8-9 (3–3)	UW–Milwaukee Panther Arena (2,831); Milwaukee, WI
Jan 22, 2005		at Butler	W 59-54	9-9 (4–3)	Hinkle Fieldhouse (3,952); Indianapolis
Jan 26, 2005		UIC	W 72-61	10-9 (5–3)	Nutter Center (4,045); Fairborn, OH
Jan 29, 2005		at Cleveland State	L 53-67	10-10 (5–4)	CSU Convocation Center (2,466); Cleveland, OH
Feb 2, 2005		Milwaukee	L 53-68	10-11 (5-5)	Nutter Center (4,134); Fairborn, OH
Feb 5, 2005		Loyola	L 57-74	10-12 (5–6)	Nutter Center (5,971); Fairborn, OH
Feb 7, 2005		Butler	W 61-55	11–12 (6–6)	Nutter Center (4,166); Fairborn, OH
Feb 10, 2005		at Detroit Mercy	L 49–71	11-13 (6-7)	Calihan Hall (2,136); Detroit, MI
Feb 16, 2005		at Youngstown State	W 71-64	12-13 (7-7)	Beeghly Center (1,891); Youngstown, OH
Feb 19, 2005*		Northern Illinois	W 72-66	13-13	Nutter Center (6,017); Fairborn, OH
Feb 23, 2005		at UIC	L 68-81	13-14 (7–8)	UIC Pavilion (4,369); Chicago, IL
Feb 27, 2005		Green Bay	W 94-80	14-14 (8–8)	Nutter Center (4,929); Fairborn, OH
Midwestern Collegiate Tournament
Mar 1, 2005	(6)	(7) Butler; First Round	W 61-57	15-14	Nutter Center (2,042); Fairborn, OH
Mar 4, 2005		vs. Detroit Mercy; Second Round	L 48–61	15-15	UW–Milwaukee Panther Arena (2,617); Milwaukee, WI
*Non-conference game. ^{#}Rankings from AP Poll. (#) Tournament seedings in parentheses. MW=Midwest.

== Awards and honors ==
DaShaun Wood	MVP
Zach Williams	MVP
Drew Burleson	Raider Award
DaShaun Wood	Second Team All Horizon League
Zach Williams	All Newcomer Team

== Statistics ==
Number	Name	Games	Average	Points	Assists	Rebounds
00	DaShaun Wood	30	15.2	456	111	154
1	Drew Burleson	30	11.0	330	12	124
33	Zakee Boyd	29	11.3	327	22	78
22	Zach Williams	30	10.4	311	75	179
3	Everett Spencer	30	5.5	164	46	132
50	Jordan Pleiman	29	5.6	162	4	131
11	Jaron Taylor	30	4.0	121	74	76
10	Lorenzo Shine	22	1.0	22	3	7
12	Vova Severosa	6	2.0	12	0	11
23	Parysh Munroe	18	0.6	11	1	16
24	Kimo Brown	3	0.7	2	0	0
40	Mitchell Goldschmidt	2	0.0	0	0	0
