= 2004–05 Butler Bulldogs men's basketball team =

American college basketball season

2004–05 Butler Bulldogs men's basketball
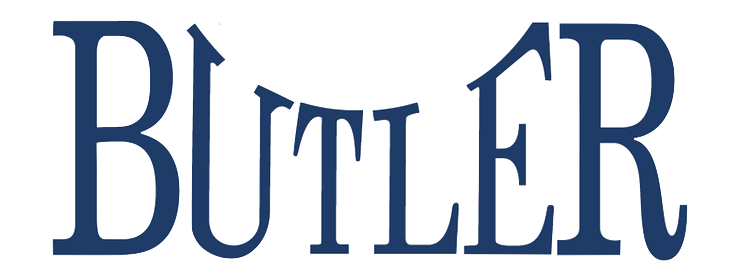
- Conference: Horizon League
- Record: 13–15 (7–9 Horizon)
- Head coach: Todd Lickliter
- Assistant coaches: Matthew Graves; LaVall Jordan; Brad Stevens
- MVP: Brandon Polk
- Captains: Avery Sheets; Bruce Horan
- Home arena: Hinkle Fieldhouse

2004–05 Horizon League men's basketball standings
	Conf.				Overall
Team	W		L	PCT	W		L	PCT
Milwaukee †	14	–	2	.875	26	–	6	.813
Green Bay	10	–	6	.625	17	–	11	.607
Detroit	9	–	7	.563	14	–	16	.467
Loyola Chicago	8	–	8	.500	13	–	17	.433
Illinois-Chicago	8	–	8	.500	15	–	14	.517
Wright State	8	–	8	.500	15	–	15	.500
Butler	7	–	9	.438	13	–	15	.464
Cleveland State	6	–	10	.375	9	–	17	.346
Youngstown State	2	–	14	.125	5	–	23	.179
† 2005 Horizon League Tournament winner

The 2004–05 Butler Bulldogs men's basketball team represented Butler University in the 2004–05 NCAA Division I men's basketball season. Their head coach was Todd Lickliter, serving his 4th year. The Bulldogs played their home games at Hinkle Fieldhouse.

== Roster ==
2004–05 Butler Bulldogs men's basketball team
Players
Coaches

Pos.	#	Name	Height	Weight	Year	Hometown
C	35	Jamie Smalligan	7 ft 0 in (2.13 m)	240 lb (109 kg)	So	East Grand Rapids, MI
G	21	Avery Sheets (C)	6 ft 0 in (1.83 m)	170 lb (77 kg)	Jr	Lafayette, IN
G	3	Bruce Horan (C)	6 ft 3 in (1.91 m)	190 lb (86 kg)	Jr	New Castle, IN
G	10	James Parker	6 ft 0 in (1.83 m)	185 lb (84 kg)	RS Sr	Chicago, IL
F	34	Jeff James	6 ft 6 in (1.98 m)	200 lb (91 kg)	Jr	Tampa, FL
F	31	Andy Grunst	6 ft 8 in (2.03 m)	240 lb (109 kg)	Jr	Milwaukee, WI
F/C	24	Brian Ligon	6 ft 7 in (2.01 m)	240 lb (109 kg)	So	St. Petersburg, FL
G/F	33	Brandon Crone	6 ft 6 in (1.98 m)	220 lb (100 kg)	So	Frankfort, IN
G/F	44	Nick Brooks	6 ft 5 in (1.96 m)	220 lb (100 kg)	So	Robinson, IL
G/F	32	Drew Streicher	6 ft 6 in (1.98 m)	185 lb (84 kg)	RS Fr	Washington, IN
G/F	1	Julian Betko	6 ft 5 in (1.96 m)	200 lb (91 kg)	Fr	Ružomberok, Slovakia
G	4	A. J. Graves	6 ft 1 in (1.85 m)	155 lb (70 kg)	Fr	Switz City, IN
F	20	Brandon Polk	6 ft 6 in (1.98 m)	210 lb (95 kg)	RS Jr	Wichita, KS
G	42	Gary Patterson	5 ft 10 in (1.78 m)	160 lb (73 kg)	Fr	Hammond, IN

Head coach

- Todd Lickliter (Butler)

Assistant coach(es)

- Matthew Graves (Butler)
- LaVall Jordan (Butler)
- Brad Stevens (DePauw)

Legend

- (C) Team captain
- (S) Suspended
- (I) Ineligible
- (W) Walk-on
- Injured
- Current redshirt

Roster
Last update: 21 August 2012

== Schedule ==
Date time, TV	Rank^{#}	Opponent^{#}	Result	Record	Site city, state
Non-conference regular season
Nov 19, 2004*		South Dakota State	W 80–52	1–0	Hinkle Fieldhouse (3,596); Indianapolis, IN
Nov 22, 2004*		Greenville	W 79–43	2–0	Hinkle Fieldhouse (2,117); Indianapolis, IN
Nov 27, 2004*		Miami (OH)	W 61–48	3–0	Hinkle Fieldhouse (4,821); Indianapolis, IN
Dec 2, 2004*		at Ohio	L 58–64	3–1	Convocation Center (2,033); Athens, OH
Dec 7, 2004*		at Bradley	L 66–75	3–2	Carver Arena (8,811); Peoria, IL
Dec 11, 2004*		at Indiana St.	L 54–57	3–3	Hulman Center (5,394); Terre Haute, IN
Dec 18, 2004*		IPFW	W 73–39	4–3	Hinkle Fieldhouse (2,563); Indianapolis, IN
Dec 22, 2004*		Ball State	W 74–68	5–3	Hinkle Fieldhouse (5,206); Indianapolis, IN
Dec 28, 2004*		Richmond	L 68–69	5–4	McKale Center (14,545); Tucson, Arizona
Dec 30, 2004*		at Eastern Washington	L 62–67	5–5	McKale Center (14,545); Tucson, Arizona
Horizon League Play
Jan 6, 2005		Milwaukee	L 68–71 ^{OT}	5–6 (0–1)	Hinkle Fieldhouse (4,143); Indianapolis, IN
Jan 8, 2005		Green Bay	L 50–57	5–7 (0–2)	Hinkle Fieldhouse (3,015); Indianapolis, IN
Jan 13, 2005		at Loyala	W 77–72 ^{2OT}	6–7 (1–2)	Joseph J. Gentile Center (1,744); Chicago, IL
Jan 15, 2005		at Detroit	L 59–72	6–8 (1–3)	Calihan Hall (3,012); Detroit, MI
Jan 19, 2005		Youngstown St.	W 50–37	7–8 (2–3)	Hinkle Fieldhouse (2,447); Indianapolis, IN
Jan 22, 2005		Wright St.	L 54–59	7–9 (2–4)	Hinkle Fieldhouse (3,952); Indianapolis, IN
Jan 27, 2005		at Cleveland St.	L 57–77	7–10 (2–5)	Wolstein Center (1,607); Cleveland, OH
Jan 29, 2005		at UIC	L 49–73	7–11 (2–6)	UIC Pavilion (4,997); Chicago, IL
Jan 31, 2005		at Green Bay	W 70–47	8–11 (3–6)	Resch Center (5,580); Green Bay, WI
Feb 3, 2005		Loyola	W 79–51	9–11 (4–6)	Hinkle Fieldhouse (2,578); Indianapolis, IN
Feb 7, 2005		at Wright St.	L 55–61	9–12 (4–7)	Nutter Center (4,166); Dayton, OH
Feb 10, 2005		Cleveland St.	L 56–65	9–13 (4–8)	Hinkle Fieldhouse (3,309); Indianapolis, IN
Feb 12, 2005		Detroit	W 65–50	10–13 (5–8)	Hinkle Fieldhouse (3,603); Indianapolis, IN
Feb 16, 2005		at No. 23 Milwaukee	L 53–64	10–14 (5–9)	U.S. Cellular Arena (5,469); Milwaukee, WI
Feb 19, 2005*		Valparaiso	W 72–69	11–14	Hinkle Fieldhouse (4,037); Indianapolis, IN
Feb 23, 2005		at Youngstown St.	W 79–59	12–14 (6–9)	Beeghly Center (2,047); Youngstown, OH
Feb 26, 2005		UIC	W 86–82	13–14 (7–9)	Hinkle Fieldhouse (3,554); Indianapolis, IN
Horizon League tournament
Mar 1, 2005	(7)	at (6) Wright St.	L 57–61	13–15	Nutter Center (2,042); Dayton, OH
*Non-conference game. ^{#}Rankings from AP Poll. (#) Tournament seedings in parentheses. All times are in Eastern Time.
