= 2002–03 Wright State Raiders men's basketball team =

American college basketball season

2002–03 Wright State Raiders men's basketball
- Conference: Horizon League
- Record: 10–18 (4–12 Horizon League)
- Head coach: Ed Schilling (6th season)
- Assistant coaches: Will Rey; Kareem Richardson; Stephen Brough
- Home arena: Nutter Center

2002–03 Horizon League men's basketball standings
	Conf.				Overall
Team	W		L	PCT	W		L	PCT
Butler	14	–	2	.875	27	–	6	.818
Milwaukee †	13	–	3	.813	24	–	8	.750
Illinois-Chicago	12	–	4	.750	21	–	9	.700
Loyola Chicago	9	–	7	.563	15	–	16	.484
Detroit Mercy	9	–	7	.563	18	–	12	.600
Green Bay	4	–	12	.250	10	–	20	.333
Youngstown State	4	–	12	.250	9	–	20	.310
Wright State	4	–	12	.250	10	–	18	.357
Cleveland State	3	–	13	.188	8	–	22	.267
† 2003 Horizon League Tournament winner

The 2002–03 Wright State Raiders men's basketball team represented Wright State University in the 2002–03 NCAA Division I men's basketball season led by head coach Ed Schilling.

== Season summary ==
Following consecutive fourth-place finishes, the 2002-03 Raiders won only four Horizon League games, stumbling through a 1-6 stretch near the end of the year that was largely uncompetitive. Reportedly Coach Schilling himself was questioning whether his team had quit on the season.

It was the sort of season that gets a coach fired. The team could shoot, but it was small and overwhelmed many nights. Attendance had dropped off about 2,000 fans a night from the highs during the 90's, and was trending down. All three freshman recruits were unavailable because two quit before the season began and a third was injured. The junior college transfers made only modest contributions to the cause. While Schilling had incentives in his contract to stay among the top 150 programs in the country (roughly the top half), the Raiders were reported to be 230th in the nation.

=== Aftermath ===
Ed Schilling was fired at the end of the season with three years remaining on his contract. "Private funds" were to pay the remainder he was owed. He had been brought in to follow the legendary Ralph Underhill, and he embraced the herculean task of producing a top 50 program with top 40 attendance. This perhaps unrealistic goal was again mentioned after his dismissal.

The swarm of players quitting the team, or in some cases dismissed from it, was not unexpected during the transition to a new coach, but instead of abating it became a yearly theme. Not every player who left was a big contributor, but it became a troubling pattern. Whether it was bad luck or poor recruiting, it looked bad. In the end, 25 players had left the Raiders program with eligibility remaining in just six seasons.

=== Roster changes ===
==== Joining ====
- Trent Vaughn (F) a junior college 3-point shooter from Itawamba.
- Lloyd Walls (C) a junior college post player from Ivine Valley College.
- Drew Burleson (F) recruited from Wheelersburg unfortunately began his college career with ankle surgery.

==== Leaving ====
- Mark Surgalski was recruited out of Ashland, Kentucky; but did not start school in September.
- Donta Patterson was recruited out of Columbus Brookahaven; but left the team citing burnout before the season began.
- Malcolm Andrews was dismissed from the team in February. The family and the school shared differing versions of the events with the local media.

== Roster ==
2002–03 Wright State Raiders men's basketball team
Players
Coaches

Pos.	#	Name	Height	Weight	Year	Previous school	Hometown
G	00	Vernard Hollins	6 ft 2 in (1.88 m)	205 lb (93 kg)	Sr	North Side	Ft. Wayne, IN
G	12	Tyson Freeman	6 ft 0 in (1.83 m)	185 lb (84 kg)	Sr	Scott	Toledo, OH
G	13	Joe Bills	6 ft 0 in (1.83 m)	185 lb (84 kg)	Sr	Rosecrans	Zanesville, OH
F	40	Thomas Hope	6 ft 8 in (2.03 m)	235 lb (107 kg)	Sr	Bluevale	Waterloo, Ontario
F	3	Braden Bushman	6 ft 4 in (1.93 m)	181 lb (82 kg)	Jr	Mississinewa	Gas City, IN
F	15	Seth Doliboa	6 ft 8 in (2.03 m)	222 lb (101 kg)	RS Jr	Springboro	Springboro, OH
F	21	Mark Starkey	6 ft 6 in (1.98 m)	214 lb (97 kg)	RS Jr	Boardman	Youngstown, OH
F	21	Trent Vaughn	6 ft 3 in (1.91 m)	218 lb (99 kg)	Jr	Itawamba CC	Cuthbert, GA
C	43	Lloyd Walls	6 ft 9 in (2.06 m)	235 lb (107 kg)	Jr	Irvine Valley College)	Esperanza, CA
G	14	Malcolm Andrews	5 ft 8 in (1.73 m)	160 lb (73 kg)	So	Western Hills	Cincinnati, OH
F	4	Drew Burleson (redshirt)	6 ft 6 in (1.98 m)	200 lb (91 kg)	Fr	Wheelersburg	Wheelersburg, OH

Head coach

- Ed Schilling

Assistant coach(es)

Will Rey, Kareem Richardson, Stephen Brough

Legend

- (C) Team captain
- (S) Suspended
- (I) Ineligible
- (W) Walk-on
- Injured
- Current redshirt

== Schedule and results ==
Date time, TV	Rank^{#}	Opponent^{#}	Result	Record	Site city, state
Nov 23, 2002*		Akron	W 78-75	1–0	Nutter Center (3,043); Fairborn, OH
Nov 26, 2002*		Cedarville	W 85-64	2-0	Nutter Center (3,606); Fairborn, OH
Nov 30, 2002*		Miami Ohio	W 51-48	3–0	Nutter Center (4,285); Fairborn, OH
Dec 4, 2002*		Morehead State	W 80–74	4–0	Nutter Center (3,398); Fairborn, OH
Dec 7, 2002*		at Ball State	L 59-66	4–1	University Arena (5,130); Muncie, IN
Dec 11, 2002*		Toledo	L 84-98	4–2	Nutter Center (3,458); Fairborn, OH
Dec 14, 2002*		South Florida	W 69-68	5–2	Nutter Center (3,858); Fairborn, OH
Dec 17, 2002*		vs. Manhattan; Billy Minardi Classic	L 74-76	5–3	Freedom Hall (19,251); Louisville, KY
Dec 18, 2002*		vs. Eastern Kentucky; Billy Minardi Classic	W 75-61	6–3	Freedom Hall (3,849); Louisville, KY
Dec 30, 2002*		at Santa Clara	L 67-71	6–4	Leavey Center (621); Santa Clara, CA
Jan 5, 2003		at Loyola	L 56-67	6-5 (0–1)	Gentile Event Center (2,015); Chicago, IL
Jan 9, 2003		Detroit Mercy	W 67–64	7-5 (1–1)	Nutter Center (5,104); Fairborn, OH
Jan 11, 2003		at Cleveland State	L 52-55	7-6 (1–2)	CSU Convocation Center (1,444); Cleveland, OH
Jan 13, 2003		at Youngstown State	L 60-66	7-7 (1-3)	Beeghly Center (1,790); Youngstown, OH
Jan 16, 2003		Butler	L 70-81	7–8 (1–4)	Nutter Center (6,767); Fairborn, OH
Jan 23, 2003		at Green Bay	L 67-69	7-9 (1–5)	Resch Center (3,849); Ashwaubenon, WI
Jan 25, 2003		at Milwaukee	L 59-74	7-10 (1–6)	Klotsche Center (2,964); Milwaukee, WI
Jan 29, 2003		UIC	L 76-89	7-11 (1–7)	Nutter Center (4,361); Fairborn, OH
Feb 1, 2003		Youngstown State	W 80-68	8-11 (2–7)	Nutter Center (5,574); Fairborn, OH
Feb 5, 2003		at UIC	L 62-77	8-12 (2–8)	UIC Pavilion (2,854); Chicago, IL
Feb 8, 2003		Loyola	L 69-71	8-13 (2–9)	Nutter Center (4,482); Fairborn, OH
Feb 13, 2003		at Detroit Mercy	L 63–68	8-14 (2–10)	Calihan Hall (1,822); Detroit, MI
Feb 15, 2003		Cleveland State	W 76-63	9-14 (3–10)	Nutter Center (4,491); Fairborn, OH
Feb 20, 2003		at Butler	L 64-79	9-15 (3–11)	Hinkle Fieldhouse (4,624); Indianapolis
Feb 22, 2003*		Fort Wayne	L 61-84	9-16	Allen County War Memorial Coliseum (3,113); Fort Wayne, IN
Feb 27, 2003		Milwaukee	L 65-98	9-17 (3-12)	Nutter Center (4,519); Fairborn, OH
Mar 1, 2003		Green Bay	W 77-74	10-17 (4–12)	Nutter Center (4,105); Fairborn, OH
Midwestern Collegiate Tournament
Mar 4, 2003	(8)	at (5) Detroit Mercy; First Round	L 61-78	10-18	Calihan Hall (1,129); Detroit, MI
*Non-conference game. ^{#}Rankings from AP Poll. (#) Tournament seedings in parentheses. MW=Midwest.

== Awards and honors ==
Seth Doliboa	MVP
Tyson Freeman	Raider Award
Seth Doliboa	First Team All Horizon League

== Statistics ==
Number	Name	Games	Average	Points	Assists	Rebounds
15	Seth Doliboa	28	22.3	625	37	211
00	Vernard Hollins	28	19.9	557	115	159
12	Tyson Freeman	26	7.8	202	39	46
3	Braden Bushman	28	5.3	149	40	69
33	Trent Vaughn	23	5.0	115	8	70
13	Joe Bills	28	3.3	92	55	34
40	Thomas Hope	28	2.8	79	18	127
14	Malcolm Andrews	20	2.5	49	16	11
21	Mark Starkey	22	0.9	19	6	31
43	Lloyd Walls	22	0.8	18	7	25
32	Jeremey Willis	5	0.4	2	2	1
