= Marion Catholic High School =

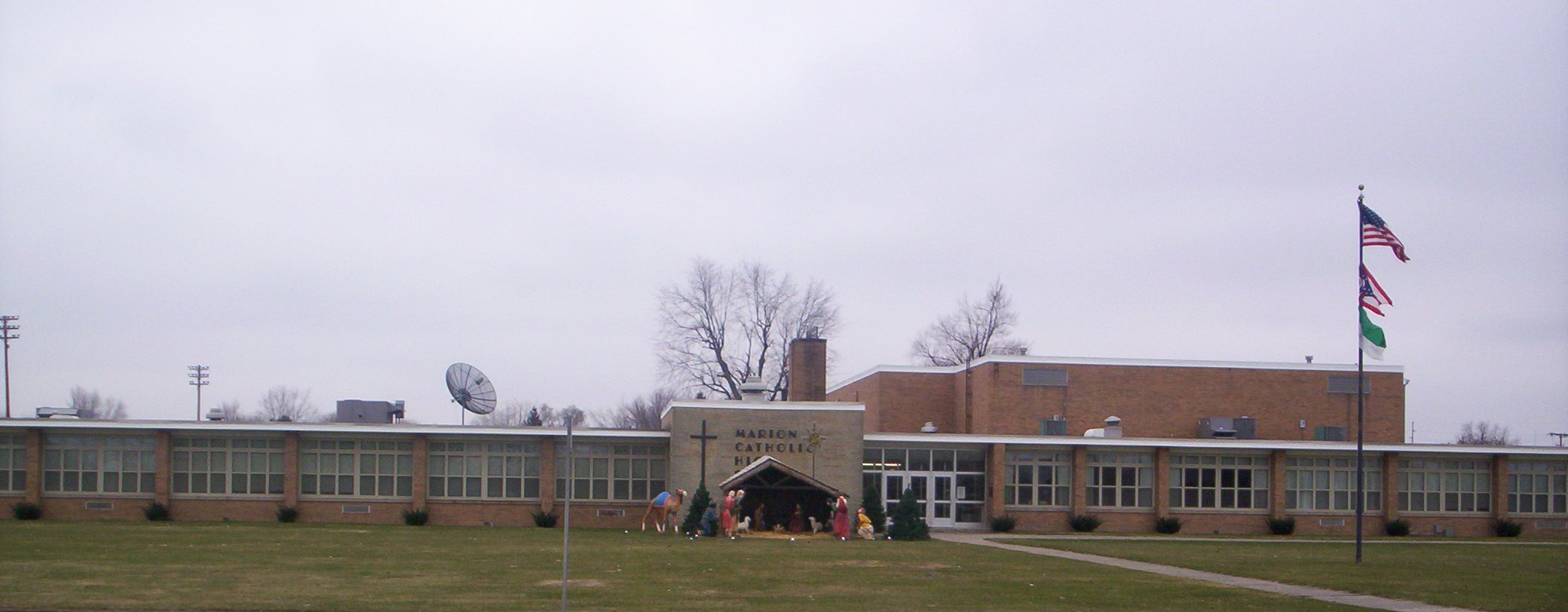

Location
- 1001 Mt. Vernon Avenue; Marion, Ohio 43302; United States; 40°34′48″N 83°6′19″W

Information
- Other name: Marion Catholic Junior/Senior Preparatory High School
- Type: Private
- Motto: In This Sign You Shall Conquer
- Religious affiliation: Roman Catholic
- Established: 1879
- Closed: 2013
- Oversight: Roman Catholic Diocese of Columbus
- Principal: Fran Voll
- Grades: 9-12
- Gender: Co-educational
- Student to teacher ratio: 10:1
- Colors: Green and White
- Athletics conference: Northwest Central Conference
- Team name: Fighting Irish
- Accreditation: Ohio Catholic School Accrediting Association
- Yearbook: The Sequel
- School fees: $175
- Tuition: $4,000
- Website: www.marioncatholic.org

Marion Catholic High School (sometimes referred to as Marion Catholic Junior/Senior Preparatory High School) was a private, Catholic high school in Marion, Ohio, United States that was established in 1879 by three sisters from the Sisters of Charity. It was part of the Roman Catholic Diocese of Columbus.

In March 2013, it was announced by Bishop Frederick F. Campbell that Marion Catholic would close following the 2012–13 school year due to declining enrollment and financial concerns.

The first class graduated in 1882 and the current building was opened in 1957. The building was listed on the National Register of Historic Places in 2017. The Marion Catholic Fighting Irish participated in the Northwest Central Conference.

== Ohio High School Athletic Association State Championships ==
- Football-1965, 1966
- Boys Track and Field – 1989

== Notable alumni ==
- Ed McCants, basketball player
