= Ed McCants =

American basketball player

Personal information
- Born: August 2, 1981 (age 44) Massillon, Ohio, U.S.
- Listed height: 6 ft 3 in (1.91 m)
- Listed weight: 200 lb (91 kg)

Career information
- High school: Marion Catholic (Marion, Ohio)
- College: Northwestern (2000–2001); Paris JC (2002–2003); Milwaukee (2003–2005)
- NBA draft: 2005: undrafted
- Playing career: 2006–2008
- Position: Shooting guard

Career history
- 2006: Grand Rapids Flight
- 2006–2007: Defensor Sporting
- 2007: PBC CSKA Sofia
- 2007: BC Spartak Pleven
- 2007–2008: BC Lami-Véd
- 2008: Battle Creek Knights

Career highlights
- Horizon League Player of the Year (2005); 2x First-team All-Horizon League (2004, 2005)

Edward McCants (born August 2, 1981) is an American basketball player. He is best known for his All-American college career at the University of Wisconsin-Milwaukee, where he led the Panthers to the school's first Sweet 16 appearance in the 2005 NCAA basketball tournament.

== College career ==
A 6'3" shooting guard from Marion Catholic High School in Marion, Ohio, first committed to Northwestern. He played the 2000–01 season for the Wildcats, but was dismissed prior to his sophomore campaign after getting into an altercation with some local residents. He spent the 2002–03 season attending and playing for Paris Junior College, then was recruited to Milwaukee by coach Bruce Pearl.

At Milwaukee, McCants led the Panthers to their first two Horizon League regular season championships in 2004 and 2005, earning first team all-conference honors both years. As a junior in 2003–04, McCants paired with Dylan Page to propel Milwaukee to a 20-11 record and a berth in the 2004 National Invitation Tournament. He averaged 17.1 points, 3.5 rebounds and 2.0 assists per game.

With the departure of Page the next season, McCants became the focal point of the offense. He responded by averaging 17.4 points per game and leading the Panthers to a 26-6 season and winning both regular season and conference tournament titles. Making the 2005 NCAA tournament, McCants led the 12 seed Panthers to a first round upset over fifth seeded Alabama. McCants scored 21 points in the 83-73 victory. In the second round, the Panthers knocked out 4 seed Boston College with McCants scoring 18, leading the program to its first Sweet 16 in its history. At the close of the season, McCants was named Horizon League Player of the Year and an Associated Press honorable mention All-American.

== Professional career ==
After the completion of his college career, McCants participated in the NBA Portsmouth Invitational Tournament but went undrafted. McCants was selected by the Arkansas RimRockers in the 2005 NBA Development League Draft, He did play professionally in the International Basketball League (for the Grand Rapids Flight and Battle Creek Knights Uruguay, Bulgaria, with stints in Italy and Hungary between 2006 and 2008.

Ed McCants Co-Founder of "Hidden Gems AAU Program" (2005, currently the active Vice President assists aspiring high school athletes prepare for college. Providing a structured summer workout coined "Summer is Serious" McCants aims to provide Marion, Ohio with an enhanced sense of tradition and pride for young hoopsters. Since the start of the "Hidden Gems" program has assisted more than 100 basketball players in landing college athletic scholarships. McCants has since begun expanding the "Hidden Gems" success into the Northwest Ohio area.
