= 2002–03 Butler Bulldogs men's basketball team =

American college basketball season

2002–03 Butler Bulldogs men's basketball
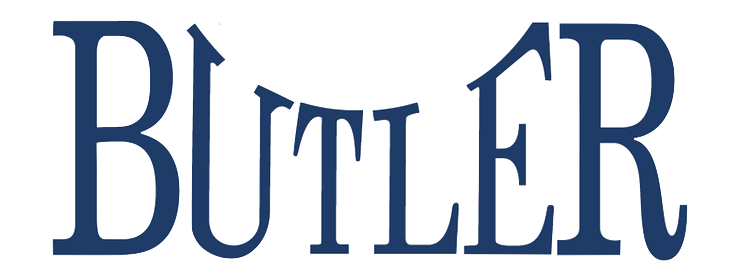

Horizon League regular season champion

NCAA tournament, Sweet Sixteen
- Conference: Horizon League

Ranking
- Coaches: No. 21
- Record: 27–6 (14–2 Horizon)
- Head coach: Todd Lickliter (2nd season)
- Assistant coaches: Matthew Graves (2nd season); Jeff Meyer (2nd season); Brad Stevens (2nd season)

2002–03 Horizon League men's basketball standings
	Conf.				Overall
Team	W		L	PCT	W		L	PCT
Butler	14	–	2	.875	27	–	6	.818
Milwaukee †	13	–	3	.813	24	–	8	.750
Illinois-Chicago	12	–	4	.750	21	–	9	.700
Loyola Chicago	9	–	7	.563	15	–	16	.484
Detroit Mercy	9	–	7	.563	18	–	12	.600
Green Bay	4	–	12	.250	10	–	20	.333
Youngstown State	4	–	12	.250	9	–	20	.310
Wright State	4	–	12	.250	10	–	18	.357
Cleveland State	3	–	13	.188	8	–	22	.267
† 2003 Horizon League Tournament winner

The 2002–03 Butler Bulldogs men's basketball team represented Butler University in the 2002–03 NCAA Division I men's basketball season. Their head coach was Todd Lickliter, serving his 2nd year. The Bulldogs played their home games at Hinkle Fieldhouse.

== Roster ==
2002–03 Butler Bulldogs men's basketball team
Players
Coaches

Pos.	#	Name	Height	Weight	Year	Hometown
G	10	Darnell Archey	6 ft 1 in (1.85 m)	160 lb (73 kg)	Sr	New Castle, IN
F	33	Joel Cornette (C)	6 ft 10 in (2.08 m)	230 lb (104 kg)	Sr	Cincinnati, OH
F	51	Lewis Curry	6 ft 7 in (2.01 m)	230 lb (104 kg)	Sr	Fort Wayne, IN
G	4	Brandon Miller (C)	6 ft 0 in (1.83 m)	170 lb (77 kg)	Sr	New Castle, IN
C	55	Mike Moore	6 ft 10 in (2.08 m)	220 lb (100 kg)	Sr	Fairborn, OH
F	23	Rob Walls	6 ft 5 in (1.96 m)	205 lb (93 kg)	Sr	Aurora, IL
G	22	Mike Monserez	6 ft 6 in (1.98 m)	235 lb (107 kg)	RS Jr	Cincinnati, OH
F	1	Duane Lightfoot	6 ft 5 in (1.96 m)	220 lb (100 kg)	Jr	Louisville, KY
G	30	Nick Gardner	6 ft 4 in (1.93 m)	215 lb (98 kg)	Jr	Indianapolis, IN
G	2	Ryan Reynolds	5 ft 10 in (1.78 m)	170 lb (77 kg)	Jr	Terre Haute, IN
G	21	Avery Sheets	6 ft 0 in (1.83 m)	175 lb (79 kg)	Fr	Lafayette, IN
G	3	Bruce Horan	6 ft 3 in (1.91 m)	195 lb (88 kg)	Fr	New Castle, IN
F	34	Jeff James	6 ft 6 in (1.98 m)	200 lb (91 kg)	Fr	Tampa, FL
F	31	Andy Grunst	6 ft 8 in (2.03 m)	240 lb (109 kg)	Fr	Milwaukee, WI

Head coach

- Todd Lickliter (Butler)

Assistant coach(es)

- Matthew Graves (Butler)
- Jeff Meyer (Taylor)
- Brad Stevens (DePauw)

Legend

- (C) Team captain
- (S) Suspended
- (I) Ineligible
- (W) Walk-on
- Injured
- Current redshirt

Roster
Last update: 21 July 2021

== Schedule and results ==
Date time, TV	Rank^{#}	Opponent^{#}	Result	Record	Site city, state
Regular season
Nov 22, 2002*		at IPFW	W 69–53	1–0	Allen County War Memorial Coliseum (4,615); Fort Wayne, IN
Nov 26, 2002*		Wayne State	W 60–37	2–0	Hinkle Fieldhouse (3,514); Indianapolis, IN
Nov 30, 2002*		Ball State	W 71–45	3–0	Hinkle Fieldhouse (7,012); Indianapolis, IN
Dec 5, 2002*		at Indiana State	W 65–45	4–0	Hulman Center (5,017); Terre Haute, IN
Dec 7, 2002*		at Evansville	W 77–64	5–0	Roberts Stadium (6,550); Evansville, IN
Dec 10, 2002*		Bradley	W 75–70	6–0	Hinkle Fieldhouse (4,064); Indianapolis, IN
Dec 14, 2002*		at Miami (OH)	W 59–42	7–0	Millett Hall (2,452); Oxford, OH
Dec 21, 2002*		Saint Louis	W 68–46	8–0	Hinkle Fieldhouse (5,016); Indianapolis, IN
Dec 28, 2002*		vs. Texas–Pan American; Rainbow Classic	W 67–48	9–0	Stan Sheriff Center (6,097); Honolulu, HI
Dec 29, 2002*		vs. Western Kentucky; Rainbow Classic	W 63–60	10–0	Stan Sheriff Center (7,184); Honolulu, HI
Dec 30, 2002*		at Hawaii; Rainbow Classic	L 78–81 ^{OT}	10–1	Stan Sheriff Center (7,925); Honolulu, HI
Jan 4, 2003		at Illinois–Chicago	W 68–65	11–1 (1–0)	UIC Pavilion (4,002); Chicago, IL
Jan 9, 2003		Loyola Chicago	W 81–74 ^{OT}	12–1 (2–0)	Hinkle Fieldhouse (5,006); Indianapolis, IN
Jan 11, 2003		Detroit Mercy	W 76–68	13–1 (3–0)	Hinkle Fieldhouse (5,479); Indianapolis, IN
Jan 16, 2003		at Wright State	W 81–70	14–1 (4–0)	Nutter Center (6,767); Fairborn, OH
Jan 18, 2003		Youngstown State	W 64–60	15–1 (5–0)	Hinkle Fieldhouse (7,268); Indianapolis, IN
Jan 23, 2003		at Milwaukee	L 65–69	15–2 (5–1)	U.S. Cellular Arena (5,007); Milwaukee, WI
Jan 25, 2003		at Green Bay	W 68–53	16–2 (6–1)	Resch Center (4,895); Ashwaubenon, WI
Jan 30, 2003*		at No. 5 Duke	L 60–80	16–3	Cameron Indoor Stadium (9,314); Durham, NC
Feb 1, 2003		Cleveland State	W 73–57	17–3 (7–1)	Hinkle Fieldhouse (5,885); Indianapolis, IN
Feb 7, 2003		UIC	W 61–47	18–3 (8–1)	Hinkle Fieldhouse (7,236); Indianapolis, IN
Feb 13, 2003		at Loyola Chicago	L 63–73	18–4 (8–2)	Joseph J. Gentile Center (3,156); Chicago, IL
Feb 17, 2003		at Detroit Mercy	W 66–63	19–4 (9–2)	Calihan Hall (6,038); Detroit, MI
Feb 20, 2003		Wright State	W 79–64	20–4 (10–2)	Hinkle Fieldhouse (4,624); Indianapolis, IN
Feb 22, 2003		at Youngstown State	W 69–60	21–4 (11–2)	Beeghly Center (3,698); Youngstown, OH
Feb 24, 2003		at Cleveland State	W 79–75 ^{2 OT}	22–4 (12–2)	CSU Convocation Center (1,229); Cleveland, OH
Feb 27, 2003		Green Bay	W 58–37	23–4 (13–2)	Hinkle Fieldhouse (4,804); Indianapolis, IN
Mar 1, 2003		Milwaukee	W 76–74	24–4 (14–2)	Hinkle Fieldhouse (11,043); Indianapolis, IN
Horizon League tournament
Mar 9, 2003	(1)	vs. (5) Detroit Mercy; Semifinals	W 58–55	25–4	U.S. Cellular Arena (7,411); Milwaukee, WI
Mar 12, 2003	(1)	at (2) Milwaukee; Final	L 52–69	25–5	U.S. Cellular Arena (10,115); Milwaukee, WI
NCAA tournament
Mar 21, 2003*	(12 E)	vs. (5 E) No. 20 Mississippi State; First round	W 47–46	26–5	Birmingham-Jefferson Civic Center (16,467); Birmingham, Alabama
Mar 23, 2003*	(12 E)	vs. (4 E) No. 14 Louisville; Second Round	W 79–71	27–5	Birmingham-Jefferson Civic Center (16,471); Birmingham, Alabama
Mar 28, 2003*	(12 E)	vs. (1 E) No. 3 Oklahoma; East Regional semifinal	L 54–65	27–6	Times Union Center (15,093); Albany, New York
*Non-conference game. ^{#}Rankings from AP poll. (#) Tournament seedings in parentheses. All times are in Eastern Time.
