= Von McDade =

American basketball player (born 1967)

Personal information
- Born: June 7, 1967 (age 59) Milwaukee, Wisconsin, U.S.
- Listed height: 6 ft 4 in (1.93 m)
- Listed weight: 185 lb (84 kg)

Career information
- High school: Vincent (Milwaukee, Wisconsin); Madison (Milwaukee, Wisconsin)
- College: Iowa Lakes CC (1986–1988); Oklahoma State (1988–1989); Milwaukee (1990–1991)
- NBA draft: 1991: 2nd round, 53rd overall pick
- Drafted by: New Jersey Nets
- Position: Shooting guard
- Number: 32
- Stats at Basketball Reference

Von Adrian McDade (born June 7, 1967) is an American former basketball player. He played college basketball for the Oklahoma State Cowboys and Milwaukee Panthers basketball teams. In 1991, he was third in the nation among college basketball players in points per game, with an average of 29.6. On December 3, 1990, McDade scored a school-record 50 points in a double-overtime loss to the Illinois Fighting Illini. He was drafted in the second round of the 1991 NBA draft by the New Jersey Nets, but he did not play in the National Basketball Association (NBA).

== College statistics ==
College statistics

Year	Team	GP	GS	MPG	FG%	3P%	FT%	RPG	APG	SPG	BPG	PPG
1988–89	Oklahoma State	14		-	36.4	13.3	61.5	1.6	.8	.6	.1	3.6
1990–91	Milwaukee	28		-	43.3	39.7	78.2	5.4	3.7	3.5	.2	29.6
