= Bruce Pearl =

American basketball coach (born 1960)

- Pearl in 2026

Biographical details
- Born: March 18, 1960 (age 66); Boston, Massachusetts, U.S.
- Education: Boston College (BS)

Coaching career (HC unless noted)
- 1982–1986: Stanford (assistant)
- 1986–1992: Iowa (assistant)
- 1992–2001: Southern Indiana
- 2001–2005: Milwaukee
- 2005–2011: Tennessee
- 2014–2025: Auburn

Head coaching record
- Overall: 706–268 (.725)
- Tournaments: 21–13 (NCAA Division I); 1–1 (NIT)

Accomplishments and honors

Championships
- 2 NCAA Division I regional – Final Four (2019, 2025); NCAA Division II tournament (1995); 4 GLVC regular season (1994, 1996, 1997, 2001); 2 Horizon League tournament (2003, 2005); 2 Horizon League regular season (2004, 2005); 2 SEC tournament (2019, 2024); 4 SEC regular season (2008, 2018, 2022, 2025)

Awards
- NABC Division II Coach of the Year (1995); NABC Division I Coach of the Year (2025); AP Co-Coach of the Year (2025); Sporting News Coach of the Year (2006); Adolph Rupp Cup (2008); 2× GLVC Coach of the Year (1993, 1994); 3× Horizon League Coach of the Year (2002, 2003, 2005); 4× SEC Coach of the Year (2006, 2008, 2022, 2025)
Medal record
Men's basketball (head coach)
Representing the United States
Maccabiah Games
Gold medal – first place	2009 Tel Aviv	Team

Bruce Alan Pearl (born March 18, 1960) is a former American college basketball coach who most recently served as the head coach of the Auburn Tigers men's basketball team for 11 seasons. He previously served in the same position for Tennessee, Milwaukee, and Southern Indiana. Pearl led Southern Indiana to a Division II national championship in 1995, during which he was named Division II Coach of the Year by the National Association of Basketball Coaches.

In Division I, his teams won four conference championships and four conference tournament championships, and qualified for eleven NCAA tournament appearances and two Final Four appearances. Pearl is the second-fastest NCAA coach to reach 300 victories, needing only 382 games to reach this mark (Roy Williams needed 370 games at Kansas to reach this milestone). His 277 wins with Auburn are the most by a coach in program history.

Pearl was named Coach of the Year by Sporting News in 2006 and was awarded the Adolph Rupp Cup in 2008. He also served as the head coach for the Maccabi USA men's basketball team that won the gold medal at the 2009 Maccabiah Games. In 2025, Pearl was named Co-AP Coach of the Year alongside Rick Pitino.

== Early life ==
A native of Boston, Pearl attended Sharon High School in Sharon, Massachusetts. He is one of the few Division I basketball coaches who never played high school basketball, even at the junior varsity level (being the only head coach in the 2022 NCAA tournament with that distinction (Note: Two other head coaches in the 2022 tournament played on their high school junior varsity teams, but never played at any higher level.)); a shoulder injury while playing football in his first year of high school prevented him from further pursuing sports as a player. Pearl is a 1982 graduate of Boston College, where he served as the manager of the men's basketball team.

== Coaching career ==
Pearl has also been the head coach at Tennessee, Milwaukee and, prior to that, at Southern Indiana, where he won a Division II national championship. He also served as an assistant coach at Stanford and at Iowa under then-head coach Tom Davis.

Against division rival Kentucky and in-state rival Vanderbilt, Pearl chose to wear a brightly colored orange jacket in honor of the late University of Tennessee coach Ray Mears. Pearl also wore the jacket during the 2009 SEC Men's Tournament Final.

=== Assistant coach (1982–1992) ===
Pearl served as an assistant coach at both Stanford University from 1982-1986 and at University of Iowa from 1986-1992 under Coach Tom Davis. Davis had served as head coach at Boston College from 1977-1982, where Pearl had served as his team student-manager.

=== Pearl/Thomas incident (1988–1989) ===
During the 1988–89 basketball season, Pearl, then an assistant coach at Iowa, was at the center of a recruiting scandal involving Illinois. Both Illinois and Iowa were recruiting Deon Thomas, a top high school player from Chicago. Pearl lost this recruiting battle when Thomas committed to Illinois. Thereafter, Pearl called the high school student and recorded a phone conversation with Thomas, which may have been illegal depending on where Pearl originated the call (Illinois requires prior consent of all participants to monitor or record a phone conversation according to Ill. Rev. Stat. Ch. 38, Sec. 14–2; Iowa, where Pearl was coaching at the time, only requires one party's consent to record a phone conversation.). During the conversation, Pearl asked Thomas if he had been offered an SUV and cash by Illinois assistant coach Jimmy Collins, and Thomas seemed to indicate that he had. Pearl then turned over copies of the tapes to the NCAA, accompanied by a memo describing the events. During the subsequent NCAA investigation, Thomas denied the allegations and said the story was false, that he was agreeing with Pearl only to try to get rid of him. Thomas later passed a polygraph test in which he denied Pearl's accusation of Illinois's offering cash and a car. The NCAA did not find Illinois guilty of any wrongdoing relating to Thomas's recruitment, finding that the purported evidence provided was not "credible, persuasive and of a kind on which reasonably prudent persons rely in the conduct of serious affairs". Because the investigation uncovered other violations, however, including Illinois's third major violation in six years, the NCAA cited Illinois with a "lack of institutional control" charge and implemented several recruiting restrictions and a one-year postseason ban.

When Pearl and Collins were both head coaches for four years in the Horizon League, the two men never engaged in the traditional postgame handshake, reportedly due to lingering feelings over the incident. When Thomas was asked about forgiving Pearl in a 2005 interview, he was quoted as saying, "It's hard to forgive a snake." Thomas went on to become the University of Illinois's all-time leading scorer.

=== Southern Indiana (1992–2001) ===
In 1992, Pearl got his first head-coaching job, at Southern Indiana (USI). He inherited a Screaming Eagles team that had won just 10 games in the previous season. Pearl posted a 22–7 record in his first season and led the Eagles to 9 consecutive NCAA D-II tournaments in addition to winning 4 Great Lakes Valley Conference titles.

In 1994, USI finished with a 28–4 record en route to a loss in the D-II championship game; in 1995, the Eagles won 29 games and claimed the D–II championship behind National Player of the Year Stan Gouard. A team from the GLVC played for the National Championship every year after his first season at USI. Pearl was named the NABC Division II coach of the year after his national championship. He left USI with a 231–46 record over nine years.

=== Milwaukee (2001–2005) ===
Despite Pearl's success at turning Southern Indiana into a major power, it took him almost a decade to return to Division I. Reportedly, he was blackballed by the Division I college coaching fraternity for his role in revealing violations at Illinois by submitting a different accusation.

Pearl took over as head coach of Milwaukee (UWM) in 2001. In just four seasons, he compiled 86 wins (including a school-record 26 in 2005, and a new Horizon League record for winning percentage) and led Milwaukee to their first NCAA tournament appearances in 2003 and 2005. Pearl led them to the Horizon League tournament title in both of those years. He also led the school to its first ever NIT bid, as well as its first-ever NCAA D–I postseason victory, in 2004. Milwaukee's 2005 NCAA Tournament run capped the best season in school history, as the Panthers won both the regular season and conference tournament titles, defeating the Detroit Titans in the championship game. Using an intense full-court press, the Panthers scored two upsets in three days over Alabama and Boston College to advance to the Sweet Sixteen, where they fell to eventual national runner-up Illinois. The Panthers finished their season 26–6 and were ranked in the coaches poll at the end of the season for the first time ever (#23). Pearl left UWM after the 2005 season, his fourth, as the Horizon League's leader in all-time winning percentage (51–13, 79.7%).

=== Tennessee (2005–2011) ===
==== 2005–06 ====
On March 28, 2005, Pearl was named as the new head coach at Tennessee, succeeding Buzz Peterson. Tyler Smith had signed with the Vols under Peterson, but decided not to attend Tennessee. Jamont Gordon went to conference rival Mississippi State. Smith opted for a season of prep school before heading to Iowa, though he later transferred to Tennessee and became a starter. Pearl stirred up more controversy when he released Matthew Dotson from his scholarship.

Expectations were low for the Vols in Pearl's first season. Having lost their two leading scorers from a team that had been just 14–17 the previous season, Tennessee was picked to finish fifth in the six-team Eastern Division of the Southeastern Conference. The season started off well, however, and Tennessee entered the national rankings in December 2005 when it routed then No. 2-ranked Texas, 95–78.

The Vols went on to lead the SEC East for virtually the entire season, with other highlights being a win over Kentucky at Rupp Arena and two wins over eventual national champion Florida. But after entering the AP Top-10 in February 2006, the team lost 6 of its last 9 games and dropped to a ranking of 18th in the AP Poll. Although Tennessee won the SEC East, it was upset in the second round of both the SEC and NCAA tournaments, the latter as a no. 2 seed and being upset by Wichita State in the round of 32. The team's 22–8 record was one of the best in school history. Following the season, Pearl drew accolades from national recruiting services for signing one of the nation's best recruiting classes, featuring three top-50 recruits in Duke Crews, Wayne Chism and Ramar Smith.

==== 2006–07 ====
On January 22, 2007, Pearl attended a Lady Vols game with his upper body painted orange. He and a few of his players spelled out "V-O-L-S" (Pearl was the "V"). Pearl stood in front of the student section and cheered for the Lady Vols as they came out. Pearl's actions brought national media attention to the Tennessee program, and highlighted efforts to support women's collegiate athletics. Lady Vols basketball coach Pat Summitt returned the favor on Senior Night for the men's team on February 27, 2007. Before the game, Summitt came out as a cheerleader, complete with uniform, and she led the crowd in a rendition of Rocky Top. The seventh-largest crowd in school history also witnessed Pearl's squad rout the then No. 4-ranked defending and eventual back to back national champions Florida Gators.

Pearl's team went on to finish tied for second in the SEC East with Vanderbilt, earning a No. 5 seed in the NCAA tournament. The Vols crushed Long Beach State by 35 points in the first round, then rallied to upset Virginia to reach Pearl's second Sweet 16. The Vols were defeated in the Elite Eight by the nation's top-ranked Ohio State Buckeyes, losing by a point despite the Volunteers being ahead for the majority of the game. Tennessee's 24 wins were then ranked third in the program's history. Pearl was rumored as a candidate for the head coaching position at Iowa, but indicated on March 27, 2007, that he was not interested in leaving Tennessee.

==== 2007–08 ====
On February 23, 2008, Pearl led the second-ranked Vols into in-state, undefeated rival Memphis to play the # 1 ranked Tigers. After a back and forth, emotionally heated contest, Tennessee defeated Memphis 66–62, handing Memphis its first loss of the season and its first home loss in 47 games. The win also cemented UT with a # 1 rank the following week—the first No. 1 ranking in the school's 100-year basketball history. One day after the rankings were posted, however, the # 1 Vols were upset by the Vanderbilt Commodores 72–69.

On March 5, 2008, Pearl's team defeated the Florida Gators 89–86 to claim Tennessee's first outright SEC Regular Season Championship in 41 years. On March 16, 2008, Tennessee was chosen as a #2 seed in the East region of the 2008 NCAA basketball tournament. Pearl's Volunteers advanced to the Sweet 16 of the East Regional, beating Pearl's former Horizon League rival and 7-seed Butler in the second round. They ended their season losing to the Louisville Cardinals by a score of 79–60. The 31 total victories that season are the most in school history.

==== 2008–09 ====
December 3, 2008, marked a significant date for Pearl as he was able to win his 400th game by defeating UNC-Asheville. In doing so, Pearl became the 6th-fastest basketball coach to ever reach the 400 mark and 2nd-fastest among active head coaches (behind Roy Williams). The night was also very important for the Tennessee basketball program. It marked the 35th consecutive victory at home for Pearl and the Vols, beating the previous streak of 34 wins, which extended from January 2, 1966, to February 24, 1968. In addition, Tyler Smith recorded the school's first ever triple-double when he had 12 points, 10 assists and 10 rebounds. In March 2009, Pearl would lead the Vols to their first SEC Tournament Final in 20 years, where they would lose in a controversial finish to Mississippi State. The Vols went on to earn a 9 seed in the NCAA tournament where they were eliminated by Oklahoma State 77–75 on March 20, 2009. Tennessee announced that they and Pearl just agreed to a six-year extension for Pearl to stay with the university.

==== 2010–11 ====
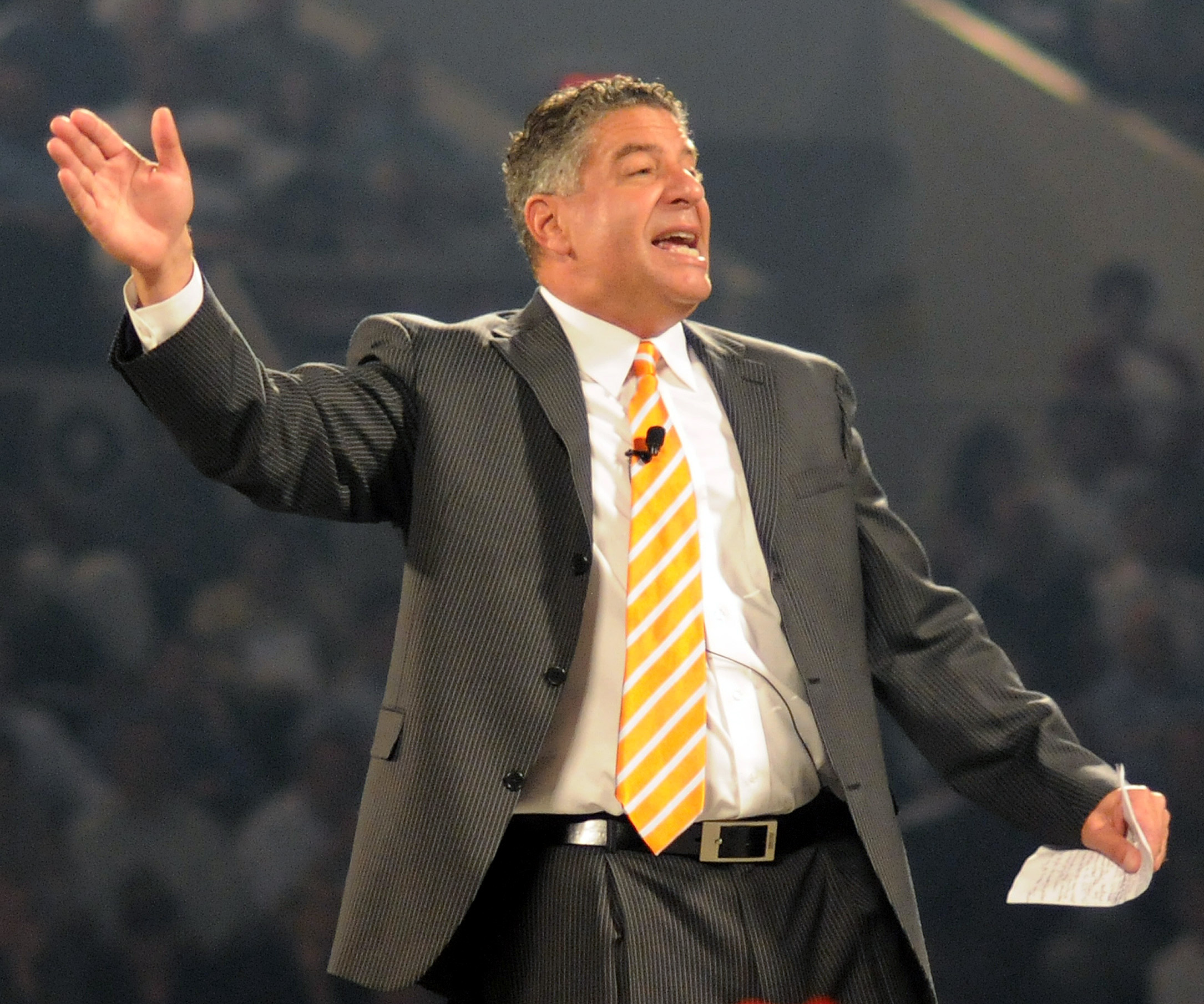
Pearl in Knoxville in 2010

On November 17, 2009, Pearl was able to record victory number 100 at Tennessee, the second fastest UT coach to reach the century mark, as his team defeated UNC-Asheville 124–49. The 124-point total was the most ever scored by Tennessee in a regular season game. Tennessee's 34 assists also set a school record and its 16 3-pointers tied another.

On January 10, 2010, Tennessee defeated the #1 ranked Kansas Jayhawks in Knoxville, 74–68. This was the first time that Tennessee defeated a #1 ranked team at Thompson–Boling Arena.

On February 27, 2010, Tennessee defeated the #2 ranked Kentucky Wildcats in Knoxville, 74–65, cementing the Vols (all 5 years that Pearl has coached) for its 5th straight NCAA tournament appearance.

On Pearl's 50th birthday, March 18, 2010, Tennessee defeated San Diego State in the first round of the NCAA basketball tournament by a score of 62–59. The Vols followed this victory with a second round defeat of Ohio, 83–69, to advance to the Sweet 16 for the third time in four years and Pearl's fourth Sweet 16 in six years.

On March 26, 2010, the Tennessee Volunteers advanced to their first Elite 8 in school history with a 76–73 defeat of the Ohio State Buckeyes. On March 28, the Volunteers narrowly missed a trip to the Final Four, losing 70–69 to the Michigan State Spartans in the Midwest Regional Final in St. Louis.

Early in the 2010–11 season Tennessee beat nationally ranked Villanova and Pittsburgh, reaching a 7–0 record and #7 AP ranking. However, controversy from an NCAA investigation took its toll on the team. The Vols went only 4–8 in their last 12 games. After limping to an 8–8 conference record, Tennessee was blown out by 30 points in the second round of the 2011 NCAA tournament by Michigan. This was the largest margin of defeat in the history of the NCAA tournament between a #8 and #9 seed. As it turned out, this would be the last game Pearl would coach at Tennessee.

==== NCAA investigation ====
In the summer of 2008, Pearl invited high school junior Aaron Craft and members of his family to a cookout at his Knoxville home while Craft was on an unofficial visit to Tennessee. At the cookout, Pearl said that Craft wasn't allowed to be there under NCAA rules, but encouraged all those in attendance not to tell anyone about it. When the NCAA began an investigation of the affair, Pearl not only lied about the cookout, but also told Craft's father to lie as well.

On September 10, 2010, Pearl acknowledged the violations in the Craft affair, and also admitted lying about it to the NCAA. As a result, Tennessee imposed sanctions on Pearl and his entire staff including $1.5 million in salary reduction over the next 5 years and a delayed retention bonus. His off-campus recruiting was also restricted completely from September 4, 2010, to September 23, 2011. On November 20, 2010, the SEC ordered Pearl to sit out Tennessee's first eight SEC games.

After finding out about additional NCAA violations, as well as a violation of the school's substance abuse policy by a player, Tennessee fired Pearl on March 21, 2011—three days after the Vols' blowout loss to Michigan.

On August 23, 2011, Pearl was given a three-year show-cause penalty for lying to the NCAA, effective until August 23, 2014. This meant that the sanctions imposed on Pearl would remain in force if he was hired by an NCAA member school within that period. Specifically, he was prohibited from engaging in any "recruiting activities", which meant he could not contact recruits, although he could evaluate talent during that period. If a school chose to hire him and challenged the NCAA restrictions, it had to appear before the NCAA Committee on Infractions and "show cause" for why the sanctions imposed on Pearl should not follow him to that school. In imposing the penalty, the NCAA said that Pearl's lies turned what would have been a minor case into a major one. His assistant coaches were also given one-year show-cause orders, in effect until August 23, 2012.

On August 30, 2011, Pearl accepted a position as Vice President of Marketing for Knoxville wholesaler H. T. Hackney.

=== Auburn (2014–2025) ===
Pearl was named Auburn's head basketball coach on March 18, 2014, replacing Tony Barbee. At the time he was hired, he still had five months remaining on his show-cause order for violations at Tennessee. As a result, he could not have contact with recruits during the summer recruiting period, but could evaluate them. Pearl was greeted by 100-plus fans when he arrived at the Auburn University Regional Airport that afternoon. Pearl was formally introduced as Auburn's 20th head basketball coach at a press conference in Auburn Arena that evening. On the opportunity, Pearl said, "I’m humbled and blessed to be back in the game that I love. I don’t know how long it will take, but it’s time to rebuild the Auburn basketball program, and bring it to a level of excellence so many of the other teams on campus enjoy. I’m thrilled to join the Auburn family and appreciative of this opportunity and the challenge that awaits." Pearl signed a 6-year contract worth $2.2 million per year with a $100,000 annual escalator.

Pearl won his first game as Auburn's head coach on November 14, 2014, against his former school, Milwaukee, 83–73. Despite failing to finish with a winning record for the first time in his career as a head coach, Pearl's first two seasons at Auburn were not without some significant wins. He led Auburn to the SEC tournament semifinals in 2015 as a 13-seed and ended Auburn's 18-game losing streak to Kentucky in 2016. He earned his 500th career win as a head coach on January 18, 2017, after defeating LSU, 78–74.

Pearl led the 2017–18 team to its best record since 1999 while winning the SEC regular season championship. A player, Bryce Brown, credits the recent team success to Pearl's taking them to Italy to build team 'chemistry', opponent preparation by Pearl, and the head coach's strong belief in each player.

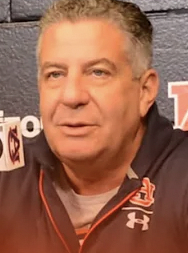
Pearl in 2019

In 2019, Pearl's team tied for 4th in the conference and won the SEC Conference tournament by beating Tennessee handily in the championship game 84–64, giving Auburn their 2nd SEC tournament championship. In the 2019 NCAA tournament, seeded #5, Pearl's Auburn team narrowly defeated #12 seed New Mexico State 78–77 in the first round. Auburn subsequently topped #4 seed Kansas 89–75 to advance to its first Sweet Sixteen appearance in 16 years. Auburn then beat No. 1 seed North Carolina 97–80 to advance to the Elite Eight, before defeating #2 seed Kentucky 77–71 in overtime to advance to Auburn's first ever Final Four. Auburn became only the second team in NCAA history to defeat the three winningest programs in college basketball history, (Kansas, North Carolina, and Kentucky) in the same season. Auburn lost to Virginia in the Final Four, 63–62.

The 2020 season would be successful for Pearl and the Tigers with the team finishing second in the SEC with a 25–6 record before the cancellation of the season due to COVID-19.

2021 was a dip in form for Pearl, after previous success. The Tigers fell from 25-6 in the preceding year to 13-14, which was only Pearl’s second losing record as a head coach.

In December 2021, the Tigers were placed on four years' probation for violations involving failure to monitor his assistant coaches while not promoting an atmosphere of compliance. Pearl was suspended for two games as well. This was Pearl's second NCAA sanctioning in less than a decade, the first one coming in 2011 while at the University of Tennessee.

2022 was a historic season for Pearl and Auburn, Pearl led the Tigers to the program's first ever #1 ranking in the AP Poll. The Tigers would win the SEC regular season championship and set a program record for regular season wins, but would fall in the Round of 32 to Miami. Following the season, Pearl led the Tigers to make draft history as well. Auburn power forward Jabari Smith Jr. was selected number 3 overall in the 2022 NBA draft, making him the highest draft pick in program history. Auburn center Walker Kessler was also selected in the first round at pick twenty-two, marking the first time that Auburn has had multiple players taken in the first round.

Also during the 2022 season, Pearl signed an eight-year, $50.2 million contract extension. The new deal went into effect after the season and was to keep Pearl at Auburn until 2030 at a $5.4 million base salary that increases by $250,000 each year.

In the 2024 season, Auburn was ranked 11th in the preseason AP poll, but the team would have tremendous success, securing the #1 ranking in the AP poll for 8 consecutive weeks during the season.. Significant wins included over #4 Houston, #5 Iowa State, #12 UNC, #16 Purdue, Texas, #15 Mississippi St., #23 Georgia, #6 Tennessee, and #2 Alabama where College GameDay was being held. Pearl won his 214th game for Auburn at Texas on January 7, 2025, surpassing Joel Eaves for most wins in program history. Securing a 27-4 regular season record, the team was awarded the #1 seed in the SEC tournament. However, the team would be eliminated in the semi-finals by Tennessee, falling 70-65. Despite the early exit in the conference championship, the team was awarded a #1 seed in the NCAA Tournament. The team would breeze through the first three rounds of the tournament, defeating Alabama State 83–63 in the round of 64, Creighton 82–70 in the round of 32, and Michigan 78–65 in the sweet 16. In the elite 8, the team would close out a close game against Michigan State 70-64 to set up a Final Four matchup with conference rival Florida. In a back-and-forth game that was highly contested, Auburn would fall short of victory to the eventual national champion Gators 79–73. Pearl ended the 2024-25 season with a 32–6 record.

On September 22, 2025, Pearl announced he was stepping down as head coach to move into an ambassador position for the university. He ended his 11-season head coaching tenure at Auburn with a 246–125 (.663) record, the most wins by a coach in program history, three SEC regular season championships, two SEC tournament championships, and two Final Four appearances. He was succeeded by his son, Steven.

== Personal life ==
Pearl is Jewish. His Hebrew name is Mordechai, after Queen Esther’s uncle Mordechai from the Jewish holiday of Purim. Pearl was the first president of the Jewish Coaches Association, and in 2019 became the fifth Jewish head basketball coach to lead a team to the Final Four. The Algemeiner named Pearl one of 100 people positively influencing Jewish life in 2022. He has publicly supported Israel in its war in Gaza, and has blamed Hamas for the ongoing humanitarian crisis afflicting the area.

His son, Steven, who played under his father at Tennessee and was his assistant at Auburn for 8 seasons, succeeded him as Auburn head coach in 2025.

== Head coaching record ==
Record table
Season	Team	Overall	Conference	Standing	Postseason
Southern Indiana Screaming Eagles (Great Lakes Valley Conference) (1992–2001)
1992–93	Southern Indiana	22–7	14–4	2nd	NCAA Division II Regional Third Place
1993–94	Southern Indiana	28–4	16–2	1st	NCAA Division II Runner-up
1994–95	Southern Indiana	29–4	15–3	3rd	NCAA Division II champion
1995–96	Southern Indiana	25–4	18–2	1st	NCAA Division II Sweet 16
1996–97	Southern Indiana	23–5	16–4	T–1st	NCAA Division II First Round
1997–98	Southern Indiana	27–6	16–4	3rd	NCAA Division II Sweet 16
1998–99	Southern Indiana	26–6	18–4	2nd	NCAA Division II Sweet 16
1999–00	Southern Indiana	25–6	17–3	2nd	NCAA Division II Sweet 16
2000–01	Southern Indiana	26–4	18–2	1st	NCAA Division II First Round
Southern Indiana:		231–46 (.834)	148–28 (.841)		
Milwaukee Panthers (Horizon League) (2001–2005)
2001–02	Milwaukee	16–13	11–5	3rd	
2002–03	Milwaukee	24–8	13–3	2nd	NCAA Division I Round of 64
2003–04	Milwaukee	20–11	13–3	1st	NIT First Round
2004–05	Milwaukee	26–6	14–2	1st	NCAA Division I Sweet 16
Milwaukee:		86–38 (.694)	51–13 (.797)		
Tennessee Volunteers (Southeastern Conference) (2005–2011)
2005–06	Tennessee	22–8	12–4	1st (East)	NCAA Division I Round of 32
2006–07	Tennessee	24–11	10–6	2nd (East)	NCAA Division I Sweet 16
2007–08	Tennessee	31–5	14–2	1st (East)	NCAA Division I Sweet 16
2008–09	Tennessee	21–13	10–6	T–1st (East)	NCAA Division I Round of 64
2009–10	Tennessee	28–9	11–5	3rd (East)	NCAA Division I Elite Eight
2010–11	Tennessee	19–15	8–8	5th (East)	NCAA Division I Round of 64
Tennessee:		145–61 (.704)	65–31 (.677)		
Auburn Tigers (Southeastern Conference) (2014–2025)
2014–15	Auburn	15–20	4–14	13th	
2015–16	Auburn	11–20	5–13	13th	
2016–17	Auburn	6–14**	0–11**	11th	
2017–18	Auburn	26–8	13–5	T–1st	NCAA Division I Round of 32
2018–19	Auburn	30–10	11–7	T–4th	NCAA Division I Final Four
2019–20	Auburn	25–6	12–6	T–2nd	NCAA Division I Canceled*
2020–21	Auburn	13–14	7–11	T–10th	Ineligible**
2021–22	Auburn	26–6	15–3	1st	NCAA Division I Round of 32
2022–23	Auburn	21–13	10–8	7th	NCAA Division I Round of 32
2023–24	Auburn	27–8	13–5	T–2nd	NCAA Division I Round of 64
2024–25	Auburn	32–6	15–3	1st	NCAA Division I Final Four
Auburn:		244–123 (.665)	112–83 (.574)		
Total:		706–268 (.725)			
National champion Postseason invitational champion Conference regular season champion Conference regular season and conference tournament champion Division regular season champion Division regular season and conference tournament champion Conference tournament champion

* The 2020 NCAA tournament was cancelled due to concerns over the COVID-19 pandemic. Auburn was 2nd in the SEC and a lock to make the Tournament.

** ^^{a} Due to former assistant coach Chuck Person's involvement in the 2017–18 corruption scandal, Auburn was ineligible for postseason play in 2021, Pearl was suspended for two games during the 2021–22 season (both were won by Auburn, one each credited to assistants Wes Flanigan and Steven Pearl), & Auburn vacated 12 wins (including seven SEC wins) achieved during the 2016–17 season as part of the sanctions from the NCAA.
