= Joah Tucker =

American basketball player

Personal information
- Born: January 6, 1983 (age 43) Milwaukee, Wisconsin, U.S.
- Listed height: 6 ft 6 in (1.98 m)
- Listed weight: 235 lb (107 kg)

Career information
- High school: Nicolet (Glendale, Wisconsin)
- College: Bradley (2001–2002); Milwaukee (2003–2006)
- NBA draft: 2006: undrafted
- Playing career: 2006–2012
- Position: Forward

Career history
- 2006–2007: STB Le Havre
- 2007–2008: CSP Limoges
- 2008–2009: Saint-Quentin
- 2011–2012: Milwaukee Blast

Joah Tucker (born January 6, 1983) is an American professional basketball player who last played for the Milwaukee Blast of the American Basketball Association. He played for the NCAA Division I Milwaukee Panthers between 2004 and 2006 where he was member of the team that made the Sweet Sixteen for the first time in school history. He was also previously a member of the Harlem Globetrotters.
