= Dylan Page =

American basketball player (born 1982)

No. 15 – Movistar Estudiantes
- Position: Small forward
- League: Liga ACB

Personal information
- Born: March 28, 1982 (age 44) Amherst, Wisconsin, U.S.
- Listed height: 6 ft 8 in (2.03 m)
- Listed weight: 225 lb (102 kg)

Career information
- High school: Amherst (Amherst, Wisconsin)
- College: Milwaukee (2000–2004)
- NBA draft: 2004: undrafted
- Playing career: 2004–present

Career history
- 2004–2005: MENT Vassilakis
- 2005–2007: Panellinios
- 2007–2008: Granada
- 2008–2009: Pau-Orthez
- 2009–2012: Chorale Roanne Basket
- 2012–2013: Union Olimpija
- 2013: Royal Halı Gaziantep
- 2013–2014: ČEZ Nymburk
- 2014–2015: Spirou Charleroi
- 2016: Capitanes de Arecibo
- 2016–present: Estudiantes

Career highlights
- Horizon League Player of the Year (2004)

Dylan Page (born March 28, 1982) is an American professional basketball player for Movistar Estudiantes of the Spanish Liga ACB.

== College career ==
He played for the NCAA Division I Milwaukee Panthers from 2000-2004 where he, along with Clay Tucker, helped the Panthers to their first NCAA Tournament appearance in 2003.

== Professional career ==
During his tenure for MENT BC in the 2004-05 season, he finished fourth in the Greek Basketball League in scoring and sixth in rebounding.

In August 2012, he signed with the Slovenian team Union Olimpija that plays in the EuroLeague. He played in 7 games of the European top competition, where he averaged 15 points and 4 rebounds per game. However, Union Olimpija and Page parted ways due to birth of his first child in January 2013. On February 12, 2013, he signed with the Royal Halı Gaziantep of Turkey for the rest of the season.

On July 24, 2013, Page signed with ČEZ Basketball Nymburk. In September 2014, he signed with Spirou Charleroi of Belgium.

On September 4, 2016, Page signed with Estudiantes for the 2016–17 season.

== EuroLeague career statistics ==
Legend
GP	Games played	GS	Games started	MPG	Minutes per game
FG%	Field-goal percentage	3P%	3-point field-goal percentage	FT%	Free-throw percentage
RPG	Rebounds per game	APG	Assists per game	SPG	Steals per game
BPG	Blocks per game	PPG	Points per game	PIR	Performance index rating
**Bold**	Career high

Year	Team	GP	GS	MPG	FG%	3P%	FT%	RPG	APG	SPG	BPG	PPG	PIR
2012–13	Union Olimpija	7	7	28.9	.527	.417	.923	4.0	1.7	.3	.0	15.0	13.1
Career		7	7	28.9	.527	.417	.923	4.0	1.7	.3	.0	15.0	13.1
