= Armin Kraeft =

American football and baseball coach

Biographical details
- Born: November 4, 1909
- Died: November 29, 2000 (aged 91)

Playing career

Basketball
- 1930–1931: La Crosse State

Coaching career (HC unless noted)

Football
- 1931–1934: Reedsburg HS (WI)
- 1935–1942: Portage HS (WI)
- 1943: Lima HS (OH)
- 1946–1955: Milwaukee (assistant)
- 1956–1959: Milwaukee

Basketball
- 1931–1935: Reedsburg HS (WI)
- 1935–1943: Portage HS (WI)

Head coaching record
- Overall: 9–23 (college football)

Armin R. Kraeft (November 4, 1909 – November 29, 2000) was an American football, basketball, and baseball coach. He served as the head football coach at the University of Wisconsin–Milwaukee from 1956 to 1959, compiling a record of 9–23.

Kraeft attended Marion High School in Marion, Wisconsin and then La Crosse State Teachers College—now known as the University of Wisconsin–La Crosse, where he played basketball and was a member of the championship team of 1930–31. He coached at Reedsburg High School in Reedsburg, Wisconsin for four years before moving to Portage High School in Portage, Wisconsin in 1935. In 1943, Kraeft was hired at Lima High School in Lima, Ohio.

Kraeft was inducted into the United States Army on December 16, 1943. He initially held the rank of corporal and served with the infantry at Camp Fannin. He then attended Officer Candidate School at Fort Benning and was commissioned as a second lieutenant. Kraeft was discharged from the military in the spring of 1946 and resumed coaching that fall when he was hired an assistant football coach and physical education instructor at Milwaukee State Teachers College—now known as University of Wisconsin–Milwaukee.

== Head coaching record ==
=== College football ===
Year	Team	Overall	Conference	Standing	Bowl/playoffs
Milwaukee Cardinals (Wisconsin State College Conference) (1956–1959)
1956	Milwaukee	0–8	0–5	T–9th	
1957	Milwaukee	2–6	1–4	10th	
1958	Milwaukee	3–5	1–5	8th	
1959	Milwaukee	4–4	3–3	5th	
Milwaukee:		9–23	5–17		
Total:		9–23			
