= Clay Tucker =

American basketball player

Personal information
- Born: June 14, 1980 (age 46) Lima, Ohio, U.S.
- Listed height: 6 ft 4 3/4 in (1.95 m)
- Listed weight: 210 lb (95 kg)

Career information
- High school: Perry (Lima, Ohio)
- College: Milwaukee (1999–2003)
- NBA draft: 2003: undrafted
- Playing career: 2003–2018
- Position: Shooting guard / small forward

Career history
- 2003–2004: Sundsvall Dragons
- 2004: Southern Crescent Lightning
- 2004–2005: Utah Snowbears
- 2005: Kansas City Steers
- 2005: MENT Vassilakis
- 2005–2007: Arkansas RimRockers
- 2007: Le Mans
- 2007–2008: Teramo Basket
- 2008: Khimki
- 2008–2009: Kyiv
- 2009: Cajasol Sevilla
- 2009–2010: DKV Joventut
- 2010–2011: Real Madrid
- 2011–2012: Lottomatica Roma
- 2012: Valencia Basket
- 2013: Hacettepe Üniversitesi
- 2013–2015: TED Ankara Kolejliler
- 2015–2016: Torku Konyaspor
- 2016: Vaqueros de Bayamón
- 2016–2017: Byblos Club
- 2018: Estudiantes Concordia

Career highlights
- BSL All-Star Game (2016); Italian League Top Scorer (2008)

Clay Jovon Tucker (June 14, 1980) is an American former professional basketball player.

== College career ==
Tucker played college basketball at the University of Wisconsin-Milwaukee from 1998 to 2003 where he and Dylan Page helped the Panthers to their first NCAA Tournament appearance in 2003.

== Professional career ==
Tucker has bounced around for much of his professional career, playing for several different teams in both the United States and Europe. His most successful season was 2004–05, as a member of the Utah Snowbears in the American Basketball Association. He was Utah's top scorer, averaging over 20 points per game. He teamed with Harold Arceneaux to lead the Snowbears to a 27–1 record that season, best in the league. However, the franchise ceased operations just days before the championship round. Despite playing only one season in the league, he was named to the ABA's All-Decade First Team for 2000–2009.

Tucker played in the NBA Summer League for the Cleveland Cavaliers in 2008 and the Detroit Pistons in 2009. He moved to Europe later in 2009, signing with Cajasol first, later moving to DKV Joventut, before finally joining Real Madrid in 2010. In August 2011 he signed with Lottomatica Roma. In February 2013, he signed a contract with Hacettepe Üniversitesi. In August 2013, he signed with TED Ankara Kolejliler. On March 7, 2016, he has parted ways with his club Torku Konyaspor.

On October 18, 2016, he signed with Byblos Club.

== Career statistics ==
Legend
GP	Games played	GS	Games started	MPG	Minutes per game
FG%	Field-goal percentage	3P%	3-point field-goal percentage	FT%	Free-throw percentage
RPG	Rebounds per game	APG	Assists per game	SPG	Steals per game
BPG	Blocks per game	PPG	Points per game	PIR	Performance index rating
**Bold**	Career high

=== EuroLeague ===
*	Led the league

Year	Team	GP	GS	MPG	FG%	3P%	FT%	RPG	APG	SPG	BPG	PPG	PIR
2010–11	Real Madrid	23*	1	23.3	.360	.291	.759	2.3	1.7	.5	.2	8.7	5.2
Career		23	1	23.3	.360	.291	.759	2.3	1.7	.5	.2	8.7	5.2
