= 2005 NCAA Division I men's basketball championship game =

American college basketball final

2005 NCAA Tournament Championship Game
National championship game
North Carolina Tar Heels	Illinois Fighting Illini
ACC	Big Ten
(32–4)	(37–1)
75	70
Head coach: Roy Williams	Head coach: Bruce Weber
- AP: 3
- Coaches: 3
- AP: 1
- Coaches: 1
	1st half	2nd half	Total
North Carolina Tar Heels	40	35	75
Illinois Fighting Illini	27	43	70
- Date: April 4, 2005
- Venue: Edward Jones Dome, St. Louis, Missouri
- MVP: Sean May, North Carolina
- Favorite: North Carolina by 2.5
- Referees: Ed Corbett, John Cahill, Verne Harris
- Attendance: 47,262

United States TV coverage
- Network: CBS
- Announcers: Jim Nantz (play-by-play); Billy Packer (color); Bonnie Bernstein and Armen Keteyian (sideline)
- Nielsen Ratings: 15.0

The 2005 NCAA Division I men's basketball championship game was the final game of the 2005 NCAA Division I men's basketball tournament and it determined the national champion for the 2004-05 NCAA Division I men's basketball season The game was played on April 4, 2005, at Edward Jones Dome in St. Louis, Missouri and featured the Chicago Regional Champion, overall #1-seed Illinois and Syracuse Regional Champion, #1-seeded North Carolina. This was the first championship game since 1999 that was played between two #1 seeds.

North Carolina took off with a 40–27 lead at the half and Illinois failed to mount a comeback win after coming back as much as 15. The Tar Heels won 75–70, for their 4th national championship, and first under Roy Williams. As of 2025, this remains Illinois’ sole appearance in the national championship game.

== Participants ==
=== Illinois Fighting Illini ===
Illinois entered the tournament as the #1 seed in the Chicago Regional. In the 1st round, Illinois survived a scare from Fairleigh Dickinson, rolling away with a 67–55 win after leading by just one at halftime. In the 2nd round, Illinois beat Nevada 71-59 for the chance to face Milwaukee in the Sweet 16 and in the Sweet 16, the Illinois backcourt propelled them to a 77–63 win over Milwaukee to advance to the Chicago Regional Finals. In the Chicago Regional Finals, Illinois came back from a 15-point deficit with four minutes remaining to beat Arizona 90–89 in overtime to keep Illinois title hopes alive with a trip to their fifth-ever Final Four. In the Final Four, Illinois dominated Louisville in the 2nd half, outscoring them 41–29. They would go on to win 72-57 and advance to the national championship game.

=== North Carolina Tar Heels ===
North Carolina entered the tournament as the #1 seed in the Syracuse Regional. In the 1st round, North Carolina used 73% shooting in the 1st half to claim a 96–68 victory over Oakland. In the 2nd round, Sean May dominated with a double-double with 24 points and 17 rebounds and Marvin Williams also dominated with a double-double with 20 points and 15 rebounds which led to UNC beating Iowa State for a chance to face Villanova in the Sweet 16 and North Carolina would hold off Villanova in the Sweet 16 beating them 67–66 to advance to the Elite Eight. In the Elite Eight, Sean May had a double-double with 29 points and 12 rebounds and Rashad McCants scored 21 points to beat Wisconsin 88–82 to advance to the Final Four. In the Final Four, North Carolina beat Michigan State 87–71 to advance to the title game .

=== Team rosters ===
2004-05 Illinois Fighting Illini men's basketball roster
No.	Name	Position	Height	Weight	Class
4	Luther Head	G	6-3	185	Sr.
5	Deron Williams	G	6-3	210	Jr.
11	Dee Brown	G	6-0	185	Jr.
15	Calvin Brock	G	6-4	185	Fr.
33	Rich McBride	G	6-	215	So.
34	Fred Nkemdi	F	6-5	235	Sr.
40	James Augustine	F	6-10	230	Jr.
41	Warren Carter	F	6-9	210	So.
42	Brian Randle	F	6-7	210	So.
43	Roger Powell, Jr.	F	6-6	235	Sr.
44	Marcus Arnold	F	6-8	250	Jr.
45	Nick Smith	C	7-2	250	Redshirt Sr.
50	Jack Ingram	F/C	6-10	245	Redshirt Sr.
55	Shaun Pruitt	F	6-8	245	Fr.

2004-05 North Carolina Tar Heels roster
No.	Name	Position	Height	Weight	Class
0	Jesse Holley	G	6-3	190	So.
1	Melvin Scott	G	6-2	190	Sr.
2	Raymond Felton	G	6-1	198	Jr.
3	Reyshawn Terry	F	6-8	214	So.
5	Jackie Manuel	G/F	6-5	189	Sr.
11	Quentin Thomas	G	6-3	175	Fr.
15	Charlie Everett	F	6-3	210	Sr.
21	Jawad Williams	F	6-9	218	Sr.
22	Wes Miller	G	5-11	185	So.
24	Marvin Williams	F	6-9	230	Fr.
25	Damion Grant	C	6-11	267	Jr.
32	Rashad McCants	F/G	6-4	207	Jr.
34	David Noel	F	6-6	224	Jr.
35	C.J. Hooker	F	6-2	188	Sr.
41	Byron Sanders	C	6-9	230	Jr.
42	Sean May	F/C	6-9	266	Jr.

== Starting lineups ==
North Carolina	Position	Illinois
Jackie Manuel	G	Deron Williams
Raymond Felton	G	† Dee Brown
Jawad Williams	F	Roger Powell Jr.
Rashad McCants	F	James Augustine
Sean May	F	Luther Head
† 2005 Consensus First Team All-American

== Game summary ==
CBS

April 4, 2005

Recap

#SY1 North Carolina Tar Heels 75, #CH1 Illinois Fighting Illini 70
Scoring by half: 40-27, 35-43
Pts: Sean May 26; Rebs: Sean May 10; Asts: Raymond Felton 7	Pts: Luther Head 21; Rebs: Roger Powell Jr. 14; Asts: Deron Williams, Dee Brown 7

Edward Jones Dome, St. Louis, Missouri
Attendance: 47, 262

North Carolina was playing looking for its 4th National Championship while Illinois was playing in its first National Championship. It was a tight contest for much of the first half before an 8–0 run by North Carolina allowed them to take a 35–25 lead. Eventually they would take a 40–27 lead into halftime. North Carolina increased its lead to 15 at one point in the second half. But Illinois began a furious charge. At one point, they would hit seven consecutive shots from the floor to turn a fifteen-point lead back to four. Unfazed, North Carolina would push the lead back up to ten before a 10–0 run by the Illini tied the game at 65-65. Illinois would tie the game at 70–70 on a three by Luther Head. But North Carolina would fight back as freshman Marvin Williams tapped back a Rashad McCants missed shot to put North Carolina back in front. Illinois would get several cracks to take the lead but were unable to convert. Eventually, Raymond Felton was able to steal the ball from Luther Head, forcing Deron Williams to foul. However Felton converted on 1 of 2 free throws giving Illinois one last chance. Head's potential game-tying three pointer bounced high and out and went into the hands of Felton who this time connected on both free throws to give North Carolina a 75–70 victory. Illinois struggled offensively with what had succeeded the rest of the season, converting only 12 of a championship game record 40 three-point field goal attempts. With his stellar post play, North Carolina forward Sean May managed to get Illinois defenders into foul trouble; starting junior forward/center James Augustine fouled out, and his substitute, senior Jack Ingram, quickly amassed four fouls. May scored 26 points as he took the Most Outstanding Player (MOP) of the Final Four.

For North Carolina head coach Roy Williams, it was his first national championship. Illinois was denied a chance to set the NCAA record for most wins in a season, instead tying the 1998–99 national runner-up Duke team with 37 (Kentucky has since won 38 games in two different seasons). For almost the entire 2004–05 season, Illinois and North Carolina were ranked #1 and #2, respectively, in all polls, and both teams were the favorites to meet in the national championship game. With its collection of raw talent, North Carolina would go on to field six players in the NBA draft, while four Illinois players would be selected in future drafts, with undrafted Roger Powell, Jr. also playing briefly in the NBA. In 2014, Sports Illustrated voted the 2005 Illinois team as the best team ever to not win a title.
