= 2004–05 Illinois Fighting Illini men's basketball team =

American college basketball season

2004–05 Illinois Fighting Illini men's basketball

NCAA tournament, Runner-up Big Ten regular season & tournament champions

National Championship Game, L 70–75 vs. North Carolina
- Conference: Big Ten Conference

Ranking
- Coaches: No. 2
- AP: No. 1
- Record: 37–2 (15–1 Big Ten)
- Head coach: Bruce Weber (2nd season)
- Assistant coaches: Wayne McClain (4th season); Jay Price (2nd season); Tracy Webster (1st season)
- MVPs: Dee Brown; Luther Head; Deron Williams
- Captains: Dee Brown; Luther Head; Deron Williams
- Home arena: Assembly Hall

2004–05 Big Ten Conference men's basketball standings
	Conf.				Overall
Team	W		L	PCT	W		L	PCT
No. 1 Illinois †	15	–	1	.938	37	–	2	.949
No. 15 Michigan State	13	–	3	.813	26	–	6	.813
No. 20 Wisconsin	11	–	5	.688	25	–	9	.735
Indiana	10	–	6	.625	15	–	14	.517
Minnesota	10	–	6	.625	21	–	11	.656
Ohio State	8	–	8	.500	20	–	12	.625
Iowa	7	–	9	.438	21	–	12	.636
Northwestern	6	–	10	.375	15	–	16	.484
Michigan	4	–	12	.250	13	–	18	.419
Purdue	3	–	13	.188	7	–	21	.250
Penn State	1	–	15	.063	7	–	23	.233
† 2005 Big Ten tournament winner As of March 15, 2005; Rankings from AP Poll

The 2004–05 Illinois Fighting Illini men's basketball team marked the 100th season of men's basketball at the University of Illinois at Urbana–Champaign. After starting the regular season with a record of 29–0 and winning the Big Ten Conference regular season title outright at 15–1, the Illini were Big Ten tournament champions. They advanced in the NCAA tournament to the national championship, marking the school's first appearance in the championship game, but lost to North Carolina, 75–70. They ended the season at 37–2, tying the record for most victories in a season for a men's college basketball team. Due to the final AP poll releasing before the title game, Illinois finished ranked as unanimous No. 1, the first such AP poll finish in program history. Sports Illustrated voted the 2005 Illinois team as the best ever not to win a national title in 2014.

== Season ==
=== Overview ===
Illinois celebrated its 100th season of varsity basketball in 2004–05. In his second season as head coach at Illinois, Bruce Weber's Illini put together the most successful season in U of I history. The Illini tied the all-time NCAA record for victories in a season with 37 wins en route to its 37–2 record (since surpassed by 2011–12 Kentucky with a 38–2 record and 2014–15 Kentucky with a 38–1 record). Illinois made its fifth all-time NCAA Final Four appearance and first since 1989. The Illini defeated Louisville in the national semifinal to advance to the championship game for the first time in school history. Illinois finished as the national runner-up, falling by five points to North Carolina in the title game.

Above all else, the team was noted for its impeccable ball movement on offense, and led the nation in assists. A constant flow of passes allowed for open looks from the three-point line on every play. Led by a three-guard starting lineup, the team did not rely upon sheer size and height like many other teams in order to dominate, but rather skill and teamwork. Illinois relied upon three-point shooting for its offensive firepower. Illinois' effective offense was largely attributable to the team chemistry that had developed amongst the starting five, which had gone unchanged over the two previous seasons. Defensively, the team was one of the best at guarding against the three-point shot. Illinois averaged 77.0 points per game, while allowing 61.1 points per game, for an average point differential of nearly 16 points.

National statistical rankings (Division I)
Statistic	Amount	National rank
Points scored	3,002	4th
Assists	727	1st
Rebounding	1,338	9th
Three-point field goals made	344	2nd
Three-point field goal attempts	877	4th
Points allowed (defense)	2,382	8th

In blowout home games, 7 ft 2 in (2.18 m) senior Nick Smith, the tallest player in University of Illinois basketball history, would take three-point shots from the top of the key. He made 4 of 11 on the season.

=== Regular season ===
The Illini started the season by setting a school record with 29 straight wins, the third best start in Big Ten history and tying the 12th best start in NCAA annals. Illinois won its second-ever game over a No. 1-ranked opponent, crushing Wake Forest 91–73 at the Assembly Hall on December 1. After the win, the Illini took over the number 1 overall spot in the national polls and held it for the remainder of the regular season, a run of 15 straight weeks. On January 25, 2005, Illinois defeated Wisconsin 75–65 at the Kohl Center, snapping the Badgers' nation-leading 38-game home court winning streak. In the process, Illinois handed the Badgers their first home court loss since a defeat to, coincidentally, Wake Forest, on December 4, 2002, and also assumed the nation's longest home court winning streak themselves.

Illinois was ranked No. 1 in the final Associated Press poll of 2005, another first for the program. The Illini then went on to win to its second straight outright Big Ten Championship with a 15–1 record, as Weber became the first coach in 100 years of Big Ten basketball to win consecutive outright league championships in his first two seasons.

=== Post-Season ===
The Illini won the Big Ten tournament, becoming just the second team to win both an outright Big Ten regular season title and the Big Ten tournament in the same season. In the NCAA tournament, the overall number 1 seeded Illini won their first three games by double digits.

In an Elite Eight matchup, Illinois fell behind early to the University of Arizona due to poor shooting behind the three-point line and sensational play by Arizona's leaders Salim Stoudamire and Channing Frye. The game featured a 15-point comeback from the Illini, triggered by several steals and Deron Williams' clutch three-point shooting, including several NBA range threes, in the last 3 minutes and 30 seconds of the game.

The Illini then defeated The University of Louisville 72–57, the team's largest margin of victory in the tournament, to move on to the 2005 National Championship Game against North Carolina.

In the national championship game, Illinois was defeated by North Carolina 70–75. North Carolina relied upon stellar post play from Sean May, who managed to get James Augustine and Jack Ingram into foul trouble, while Illinois struggled offensively with what had succeeded the rest of the season, converting only 12 of a championship game record 40 three-point field goal attempts. James Augustine played 9 minutes due to foul trouble, forcing Jack Ingram to play a huge role in the second half comeback the Illini made. For almost the entire season, Illinois was ranked #1 and North Carolina was ranked #2, respectively, in all polls, and both teams were the favorites to meet in the national championship game. The North Carolina squad would go on to field six players in the NBA draft.

=== Accolades ===
Bruce Weber was named National Coach of the Year by nine organizations. Dee Brown, "The One Man Fast Break", was named The Sporting News National Player of the Year and swept the conference honors as well, being named both Big Ten Player of the Year and Big Ten Defensive Player of the Year. The Illini had three players earn consensus All-America honors in the same season for the first time ever. In addition to Brown earning consensus first-team All-America honors, Deron Williams and Luther Head were named consensus second-team All-Americans. Following the season, both Williams and Head were chosen in the first round of the NBA draft, with Head being drafted No. 24 overall by the Houston Rockets while Williams became the highest Illinois player ever drafted when he was chosen No. 3 overall by the Utah Jazz.

== Team ==
=== Roster ===
2004–05 Illinois Fighting Illini men's basketball team
Players
Coaches

Pos.	#	Name	Height	Weight	Year	Previous school	Hometown
G	4	Luther Head (C)	6 ft 3 in (1.91 m)	185 lb (84 kg)	Sr	Manley High School	Chicago, IL
G	5	Deron Williams (C)	6 ft 3 in (1.91 m)	210 lb (95 kg)	Jr	The Colony High School	The Colony, TX
G	11	Dee Brown (C)	6 ft 0 in (1.83 m)	185 lb (84 kg)	Jr	Proviso East High School	Maywood, IL
G	15	Calvin Brock (redshirt)	6 ft 4 in (1.93 m)	185 lb (84 kg)	Fr	Simeon High School	Chicago, IL
G	33	Rich McBride	6 ft 3 in (1.91 m)	215 lb (98 kg)	So	Lanphier High School	Springfield, IL
F	34	Fred Nkemdi (W)	6 ft 5 in (1.96 m)	235 lb (107 kg)	Sr	Riverside Brookfield High School/Morton Junior College	North Riverside, IL
F/C	40	James Augustine	6 ft 10 in (2.08 m)	230 lb (104 kg)	Jr	Lincoln-Way Central High School	Mokena, IL
F	41	Warren Carter	6 ft 8 in (2.03 m)	220 lb (100 kg)	So	Lake Highlands High School	Dallas, TX
F	42	Brian Randle (injured) (redshirt)	6 ft 7 in (2.01 m)	210 lb (95 kg)	So	Notre Dame High School	East Peoria, IL
F	43	Roger Powell, Jr.	6 ft 6 in (1.98 m)	235 lb (107 kg)	Sr	Joliet Central High School	Joliet, IL
F	44	Marcus Arnold (redshirt)	6 ft 8 in (2.03 m)	250 lb (113 kg)	Jr	Morgan Park High School/Illinois State University	Chicago, IL
C	45	Nick Smith	7 ft 2 in (2.18 m)	250 lb (113 kg)	RS Sr	Bloomingdale High School	Valrico, FL
F/C	50	Jack Ingram	6 ft 10 in (2.08 m)	245 lb (111 kg)	RS Sr	Marshall High School/University of Tulsa	San Antonio, TX
F	55	Shaun Pruitt	6 ft 8 in (2.03 m)	245 lb (111 kg)	Fr	West Aurora High School	Aurora, IL

Head coach

- Bruce Weber (Wisconsin-Milwaukee)

Assistant coach(es)

- Wayne McClain (Illinois State)
- Jay Price (Kansas)
- Tracy Webster (Wisconsin)

Legend

- (C) Team captain
- (S) Suspended
- (I) Ineligible
- (W) Walk-on
- Injured
- Current redshirt

Roster

=== Depth chart ===
Pos.	Starting 5	Bench 1	Bench 2	Bench 3
F/C	James Augustine	Nick Smith	Shaun Pruitt
F	Roger Powell, Jr.	Jack Ingram	Warren Carter	Fred Nkemdi
SG	Dee Brown	Rich McBride
SG	Luther Head
PG	Deron Williams

=== Injuries ===
Sophomore Brian Randle took a medical redshirt after punching a wall in frustration and breaking his hand during preseason practice.

== Records ==
Season records
Type of record	Record
Overall	37–2
Regular season	29–1
Conference	15–1
Non-conference	14–0
Home	15–0
Road	9–1
Neutral	5–0
Neutral (including tournaments)	13–1
Blowouts (10+ points)	31–0

== Schedule ==
Date time, TV	Rank^{#}	Opponent^{#}	Result	Record	Site (attendance) city, state
Exhibition
Fri, Nov 5, 2004*; 7:00 pm	No. 5	Southern Illinois-Edwardsville	W 78–58		Assembly Hall (16,618); Champaign, IL
Sun, Nov 14, 2004*; 3:00 pm	No. 5	Lewis	W 92–61		Assembly Hall (16,618); Champaign, IL
Non-Conference regular season
Fri, Nov 19, 2004*; 7:05 pm	No. 6	Delaware State	W 87–67	1–0	Assembly Hall (16,618); Champaign, IL
Sun, Nov 21, 2004*; 1:00 pm	No. 6	Florida A&M	W 91–60	2–0	Assembly Hall (15,518); Champaign, IL
Wed, Nov 24, 2004*; 7:05 pm, ESPN Plus	No. 5	Oakland	W 85–54	3–0	Assembly Hall (13,932); Champaign, IL
Sat, Nov 27, 2004*; 1:00 pm, WBBM	No. 5	vs. No. 24 Gonzaga	W 89–72	4–0	Conseco Fieldhouse (14,183); Indianapolis, IN
Wed, Dec 1, 2004*; 6:05 pm, ESPN	No. 5	No. 1 Wake Forest; ACC-Big Ten Challenge	W 91–73	5–0	Assembly Hall (16,618); Champaign, IL
Sat, Dec 4, 2004*; 1:00 pm, ESPN	No. 5	at Arkansas	W 72–60	6–0	Alltel Arena (13,140); North Little Rock, AR
Mon, Dec 6, 2004*; 7:05 pm, ESPN Plus	No. 1	Chicago State	W 78–59	7–0	Assembly Hall (16,618); Champaign, IL
Thu, Dec 9, 2004*; 7:30 pm, ESPN Plus	No. 1	at Georgetown	W 74–59	8–0	MCI Center (12,401); Washington, DC
Sat, Dec 11, 2004*; 1:00 pm, ESPN	No. 1	vs. Oregon	W 83–66	9–0	United Center (21,224); Chicago, IL
Sun, Dec 19, 2004*; 4:00 pm	No. 1	Valparaiso	W 93–56	10–0	Assembly Hall (16,618); Champaign, IL
Wed, Dec 22, 2004*; 7:05 pm, ESPN2	No. 1	vs. Missouri; Braggin' Rights	W 70–64	11–0	Savvis Center (22,153); St. Louis, MO
Mon, Dec 27, 2004*; 7:05 pm	No. 1	Longwood	W 105–79	12–0	Assembly Hall (16,618); Champaign, IL
Thu, Dec 30, 2004*; 4:00 pm, FSN	No. 1	vs. Northwestern State; Las Vegas Holiday Classic	W 69–51	13–0	Valley High (2,500); Las Vegas, NV
Fri, Dec 31, 2004*; 5:00 pm, FSN	No. 1	vs. No. 22 Cincinnati; Las Vegas Holiday Classic	W 67–45	14–0	Valley High (2,500); Las Vegas, NV
Big Ten regular season
Wed, Jan 5, 2005; 8:05 pm, ESPN Plus	No. 1	Ohio State	W 84–65	15–0 (1–0)	Assembly Hall (16,618); Champaign, IL
Sat, Jan 8, 2005; 4:00 pm, CBS	No. 1	at Purdue	W 68–59	16–0 (2–0)	Mackey Arena (14,123); West Lafayette, IN
Wed, Jan 12, 2005; 8:00 pm, ESPN Plus	No. 1	Penn State	W 90–64	17–0 (3–0)	Assembly Hall (16,618); Champaign, IL
Sat, Jan 15, 2005; 3:30 pm, ESPN Plus	No. 1	at Northwestern; Rivalry	W 78–66	18–0 (4–0)	Welsh-Ryan Arena (8,117); Evanston, IL
Thu, Jan 20, 2005; 6:00 pm, ESPN	No. 1	No. 23 Iowa; Rivalry	W 73–68 ^{OT}	19–0 (5–0)	Assembly Hall (16,618); Champaign, IL
Tue, Jan 25, 2005; 8:00 pm, ESPN	No. 1	at No. 18 Wisconsin	W 75–65	20–0 (6–0)	Kohl Center (17,142); Madison, WI
Sat, Jan 29, 2005; 1:30 pm, ESPN Plus	No. 1	Minnesota	W 89–66	21–0 (7–0)	Assembly Hall (16,694); Champaign, IL
Tue, Feb 1, 2005; 7:05 pm, ESPN	No. 1	at No. 12 Michigan State	W 81–68	22–0 (8–0)	Breslin Center (14,759); East Lansing, MI
Sun, Feb 6, 2005; 12:00 pm, CBS	No. 1	Indiana; Rivalry	W 60–47	23–0 (9–0)	Assembly Hall (16,618); Champaign, IL
Tue, Feb 8, 2005; 7:05 pm, ESPN	No. 1	at Michigan	W 57–51	24–0 (10–0)	Crisler Arena (13,751); Ann Arbor, MI
Sat, Feb 12, 2005; 12:00 pm, CBS	No. 1	No. 20 Wisconsin	W 70–59	25–0 (11–0)	Assembly Hall (16,865); Champaign, IL
Wed, Feb 16, 2005; 8:05 pm, ESPN Plus	No. 1	at Penn State	W 83–63	26–0 (12–0)	Bryce Jordan Center (10,966); University Park, PA
Sat, Feb 19, 2005; 11:05 am, ESPN	No. 1	at Iowa; Rivalry	W 75–65	27–0 (13–0)	Carver-Hawkeye Arena (15,500); Iowa City, IA
Wed, Feb 23, 2005; 7:05 pm, ESPN Plus	No. 1	Northwestern; Rivalry	W 84–48	28–0 (14–0)	Assembly Hall (16,618); Champaign, IL
Thu, Mar 3, 2005; 8:00 pm, ESPN2	No. 1	Purdue	W 84–50	29–0 (15–0)	Assembly Hall (16,618); Champaign, IL
Sun, Mar 6, 2005; 12:00 pm, CBS	No. 1	at Ohio State	L 64–65	29–1 (15–1)	Value City Arena (19,200); Columbus, OH
Big Ten tournament
Fri, Mar 11, 2005; 11:00 am, ESPN	(1) No. 1	vs. (8) Northwestern; Quarterfinals	W 68–51	30–1	United Center (22,413); Chicago, IL
Sat, Mar 12, 2005; 11:00 am, CBS	(1) No. 1	vs. (5) Minnesota; Semifinals	W 64–56	31–1	United Center (23,697); Chicago, IL
Sun, Mar 13, 2005; 12:00 pm, CBS	(1) No. 1	vs. (3) No. 23 Wisconsin; Championship Game	W 54–43	32–1	United Center (22,157); Chicago, IL
NCAA tournament
Thu, Mar 17, 2005*; 9:40 pm, CBS	(1 C) No. 1	vs. (16 C) Fairleigh Dickinson; First Round	W 67–55	33–1	RCA Dome (26,804); Indianapolis, IN
Sat, Mar 19, 2005*; 5:40 pm, CBS	(1 C) No. 1	vs. (9 C) Nevada; Second Round	W 71–59	34–1	RCA Dome (40,331); Indianapolis, IN
Thu, Mar 24, 2005*; 6:27 pm, CBS	(1 C) No. 1	vs. (12 C) Milwaukee; Sweet Sixteen	W 77–63	35–1	Allstate Arena (16,957); Rosemont, IL
Sat, Mar 26, 2005*; 5:40 pm, CBS	(1 C) No. 1	vs. (3 C) No. 9 Arizona; Elite Eight	W 90–89 ^{OT}	36–1	Allstate Arena (16,957); Rosemont, IL
Sat, Apr 2, 2005*; 5:07 pm, CBS	(1 C) No. 1	vs. (4 A) No. 4 Louisville; Final Four	W 72–57	37–1	Edward Jones Dome (47,754); St. Louis, MO
Mon, Apr 4, 2005*; 8:21 pm, CBS	(1 C) No. 1	vs. (1 S) No. 3 North Carolina; National Championship	L 70–75	37–2	Edward Jones Dome (47,262); St. Louis, MO
*Non-conference game. ^{#}Rankings from AP Poll. (#) Tournament seedings in parentheses. All times are in Central Time.

== Season Statistics ==
Legend
GP	Games played	GS	Games started	Avg	Average per game
FG	Field-goals made	FGA	Field-goal attempts	Off	Offensive rebounds
Def	Defensive rebounds	A	Assists	TO	Turnovers
Blk	Blocks	Stl	Steals	High	Team high

Statistics
			Minutes		Scoring		Total FGs			3-point FGs			Free-Throws			Rebounds							
Player	GP	GS	Tot	Avg	Pts	Avg	FG	FGA	Pct	3FG	3FA	Pct	FT	FTA	Pct	Off	Def	Tot	Avg	A	TO	Blk	Stl
Head, Luther	39	39	1297	33.3	622	15.9	214	462	.463	116	283	.410	78	99	.788	24	131	155	4.0	150	69	9	67
Brown, Dee	39	39	1272	32.6	518	13.3	179	359	.499	99	228	.434	61	79	.772	21	83	104	2.7	177	73	3	70
Williams, Deron	39	39	1315	33.7	489	12.5	178	411	.433	68	187	.364	65	96	.677	14	128	142	3.6	264	109	8	38
Powell, Roger	39	39	979	25.1	467	12.0	175	319	.549	20	52	.385	97	133	.729	103	119	222	5.7	16	42	9	25
Augustine, James	39	39	1037	26.6	392	10.1	141	227	.621	0	0	.000	110	147	.748	100	195	295	7.6	43	46	46	36
Ingram, Jack	39	0	589	15.1	174	4.5	71	150	.473	9	23	.391	23	29	.793	51	56	107	2.7	17	15	20	26
Smith, Nick	38	0	413	10.9	127	3.3	54	133	.406	4	11	.364	15	23	.652	20	58	78	2.1	24	21	18	11
McBride, Rich	38	0	546	14.4	98	2.6	32	99	.323	27	87	.310	7	7	1.000	16	35	51	1.3	29	19	2	15
Carter, Warren	33	0	261	7.9	74	2.2	32	62	.516	1	6	.167	9	19	.474	19	39	58	1.8	5	14	6	9
Pruitt, Shaun	21	0	97	4.6	29	1.4	10	26	.385	0	0	.000	9	18	.500	10	9	19	0.9	0	10	1	3
Nkemdi, Fred	18	0	44	2.4	12	0.7	6	10	.600	0	0	.000	0	1	.000	4	2	6	0.3	2	6	1	0
Team																43	58	101			4		
Total	39		7850		3002	77.0	1092	2258	.484	344	877	.392	474	651	.728	425	913	1338	34.3	727	428	123	300
Opponents	39		7850		2382	61.1	869	2094	.415	233	651	.358	411	618	.665	407	815	1222	31.3	482	580	99	196

== Awards and honors ==
- James Augustine
  - Big Ten tournament Most Outstanding Player
- Dee Brown
  - Consensus All-American 1st team
  - United States Basketball Writers Association 1st team All-American
  - Sporting News National Player of the Year
  - Big Ten Player of the Year
  - Chicago Tribune Silver Basketball
  - Big Ten Defensive Player of the Year
  - Associated Press 2nd team All-American
  - National Basketball Coaches Association 2nd team All-American
  - Team Co-Most Valuable Player
- Luther Head
  - Consensus All-American 2nd team
  - Associated Press 2nd team All-American
  - United States Basketball Writers Association 1st team All-American
  - National Basketball Coaches Association 2nd team All-American
  - NCAA Final Four All-Tournament Team
  - Team Co-Most Valuable Player
- Deron Williams
  - Consensus All-American 2nd team
  - National Basketball Coaches Association 2nd team All-American
  - Sporting News 2nd team All-American
  - Associated Press 3rd team All-American
  - NCAA Final Four All-Tournament Team
  - NCAA Tournament Regional Most Outstanding Player
  - Team Co-Most Valuable Player
- Bruce Weber
  - National Coach of the Year
  - Big Ten Coach of the Year

== Team players drafted into the NBA ==
Year	Player	NBA Club	Round	Pick
2005	Deron Williams	Utah Jazz	1	3
2005	Luther Head	Houston Rockets	1	24
2006	James Augustine	Orlando Magic	2	41
2006	Dee Brown	Utah Jazz	2	46
