= 2005 Big Ten men's basketball tournament =

Collegiate basketball tournament

- Classification: Division I
- Season: 2004–05
- Teams: 11
- Site: United Center; Chicago, Illinois
- Champions: Illinois Fighting Illini (2nd title)
- Winning coach: Bruce Weber (1st title)
- MVP: James Augustine (Illinois)

2004–05 Big Ten Conference men's basketball standings
	Conf.				Overall
Team	W		L	PCT	W		L	PCT
No. 1 Illinois †	15	–	1	.938	37	–	2	.949
No. 15 Michigan State	13	–	3	.813	26	–	6	.813
No. 20 Wisconsin	11	–	5	.688	25	–	9	.735
Indiana	10	–	6	.625	15	–	14	.517
Minnesota	10	–	6	.625	21	–	11	.656
Ohio State	8	–	8	.500	20	–	12	.625
Iowa	7	–	9	.438	21	–	12	.636
Northwestern	6	–	10	.375	15	–	16	.484
Michigan	4	–	12	.250	13	–	18	.419
Purdue	3	–	13	.188	7	–	21	.250
Penn State	1	–	15	.063	7	–	23	.233
† 2005 Big Ten tournament winner As of March 15, 2005; Rankings from AP Poll

The 2005 Big Ten men's basketball tournament was the postseason men's basketball tournament for the Big Ten Conference and was played between March 9 and 12, 2005, at the United Center in Chicago, Illinois. This was the eighth annual Big Ten Men's Basketball Tournament. The championship was won by Illinois who defeated Wisconsin in the championship game. As a result, Illinois received the Big Ten's automatic bid to the NCAA tournament. The win marked the second tournament championship for Illinois in their fifth championship game appearance.

== Seeds ==
All Big Ten schools played in the tournament. Teams were seeded by conference record, with a tiebreaker system used to seed teams with identical conference records. Seeding for the tournament was determined at the close of the regular conference season. The top five teams received a first round bye.

Seed	School	Conference
1	Illinois	15–1
2	Michigan State	13–3
3	Wisconsin	11–5
4	Indiana	10–6
5	Minnesota	10–6
6	Ohio State	8–8
7	Iowa	7–9
8	Northwestern	6–10
9	Michigan	4–12
10	Purdue	3–13
11	Penn State	1–15

== Bracket ==
Opening round March 10
8	Northwestern	58
9	Michigan	56
7	Iowa	71
10	Purdue	52
6	Ohio State	72
11	Penn State	69

Quarterfinals; March 11
1	#1 Illinois	68
8	Northwestern	51
4	Indiana	55
5	Minnesota	71
2	#13 Michigan State	69
7	Iowa	71
3	#23 Wisconsin	60
6	Ohio State	49

Semifinals; March 12
1	#1 Illinois	64
5	Minnesota	56
7	Iowa	56
3	#23 Wisconsin	59

Championship; March 13
1	#1 Illinois	54
3	#23 Wisconsin	43

== All-Tournament Team ==
- James Augustine, Illinois – Big Ten tournament Most Outstanding Player
- Luther Head, Illinois
- Vincent Grier, Minnesota
- Zach Morley, Wisconsin
- Alando Tucker, Wisconsin
