= 2004–05 Michigan Wolverines men's basketball team =

American college basketball season

2004–05 Michigan Wolverines men's basketball
- Conference: Big Ten Conference
- Record: 13–18 (4–12 Big Ten)
- Head coach: Tommy Amaker (4th season)
- Assistant coaches: Charles Ramsey; Chuck Swenson; Andrew Moore
- MVP: Dion Harris
- Captains: Lester Abram; Graham Brown; Sherrod Harrell

2004–05 Big Ten Conference men's basketball standings
| | Conf. | | | | Overall |
| Team | W | | L | PCT | W | | L | PCT |
|---|---|---|---|---|---|---|---|---|
| No. 1 Illinois † | 15 | – | 1 | .938 | 37 | – | 2 | .949 |
| No. 15 Michigan State | 13 | – | 3 | .813 | 26 | – | 6 | .813 |
| No. 20 Wisconsin | 11 | – | 5 | .688 | 25 | – | 9 | .735 |
| Indiana | 10 | – | 6 | .625 | 15 | – | 14 | .517 |
| Minnesota | 10 | – | 6 | .625 | 21 | – | 11 | .656 |
| Ohio State | 8 | – | 8 | .500 | 20 | – | 12 | .625 |
| Iowa | 7 | – | 9 | .438 | 21 | – | 12 | .636 |
| Northwestern | 6 | – | 10 | .375 | 15 | – | 16 | .484 |
| Michigan | 4 | – | 12 | .250 | 13 | – | 18 | .419 |
| Purdue | 3 | – | 13 | .188 | 7 | – | 21 | .250 |
| Penn State | 1 | – | 15 | .063 | 7 | – | 23 | .233 |
† 2005 Big Ten tournament winner As of March 15, 2005; Rankings from AP Poll

The 2004-05 Michigan Wolverines men's basketball team represented the University of Michigan in intercollegiate college basketball during the 2004-05 season. The team played its home games in the Crisler Arena in Ann Arbor, Michigan, and was a member of the Big Ten Conference. Under the direction of head coach Tommy Amaker, the team finished tied for seventh in the Big Ten Conference. The team earned a ninth seed and was defeated in the first round of the 2005 Big Ten Conference men's basketball tournament. The team failed to earn an invitation to either the 2005 National Invitation Tournament or the 2005 NCAA Men's Division I Basketball Tournament. The team was unranked for all eighteen weeks of Associated Press Top Twenty-Five Poll, and it also ended the season unranked in the final USA Today/CNN Poll. The team had a 2–7 record against ranked opponents, with its victories coming against #20 Notre Dame 61–60 on December 4, 2004, at Crisler Arena and #14 Iowa 65–53 on January 5 at Carver-Hawkeye Arena.

Lester Abram, Graham Brown, and Sherrod Harrell served as team co-captains, and Dion Harris earned team MVP honors. The team's leading scorers were Dion Harris (444 points), Courtney Sims (305 points) and Ron Coleman (233 points). The leading rebounders were Courtney Sims (160), Brent Petway (158) and Graham Brown (115).

In the 2005 Big Ten Conference men's basketball tournament at the United Center from March 10–13, Michigan was seeded ninth. In the first round, they lost to number 8 Northwestern 58–56.
