= 2004–05 Purdue Boilermakers men's basketball team =

American college basketball season

2004–05 Purdue Boilermakers men's basketball
- Conference: Big Ten Conference
- Record: 7–21 (3–13 Big Ten)
- Head coach: Gene Keady (25th season)
- Assistant coaches: Matt Painter (1st season); Cuonzo Martin (5th season); Paul Lusk (1st season); Todd Foster (6th season)
- Home arena: Mackey Arena

2004–05 Big Ten Conference men's basketball standings
	Conf.				Overall
Team	W		L	PCT	W		L	PCT
No. 1 Illinois †	15	–	1	.938	37	–	2	.949
No. 15 Michigan State	13	–	3	.813	26	–	6	.813
No. 20 Wisconsin	11	–	5	.688	25	–	9	.735
Indiana	10	–	6	.625	15	–	14	.517
Minnesota	10	–	6	.625	21	–	11	.656
Ohio State	8	–	8	.500	20	–	12	.625
Iowa	7	–	9	.438	21	–	12	.636
Northwestern	6	–	10	.375	15	–	16	.484
Michigan	4	–	12	.250	13	–	18	.419
Purdue	3	–	13	.188	7	–	21	.250
Penn State	1	–	15	.063	7	–	23	.233
† 2005 Big Ten tournament winner As of March 15, 2005; Rankings from AP Poll

The 2004–05 Purdue Boilermakers men's basketball team represented Purdue University during the 2004-05 NCAA Division I men's basketball season. Gene Keady served in his last year as head coach after a 25-year career at Purdue. The Boilermakers failed to beat a ranked team this season for the first time in Keady's time as head coach and for the first time since the 1974–75 season. Purdue placed 10th in the Big Ten, ahead of 11th place Penn State.

== Roster ==
2004–05 Purdue Boilermakers men's basketball team
Players
Coaches

Pos.	#	Name	Height	Weight	Year	Hometown
G	2	David Teague	6 ft 5 in (1.96 m)	196 lb (89 kg)	Jr	Indianapolis, IN
F	4	Adam Liddell	6 ft 7 in (2.01 m)	215 lb (98 kg)	Fr	DeKalb, IN
G	4	Andrew Ford	6 ft 2 in (1.88 m)	195 lb (88 kg)	Sr	West Lafayette, IN
G	5	Bryant Dillon	6 ft 6 in (1.98 m)	180 lb (82 kg)	Jr	Indianapolis, IN
G	10	Brandon McKnight	6 ft 2 in (1.88 m)	191 lb (87 kg)	Sr	South Bend, IN
C	12	Ije Nwankwo	6 ft 7 in (2.01 m)	275 lb (125 kg)	So	Ann Arbor, MI
F	14	Carl Landry	6 ft 9 in (2.06 m)	248 lb (112 kg)	Jr	Milwaukee, WI
G	23	Xavier Price	6 ft 3 in (1.91 m)	210 lb (95 kg)	Fr	Lebanon, IN
G	31	Chris Hartley	6 ft 4 in (1.93 m)	198 lb (90 kg)	So	Noblesville, IN
F	32	Matt Carroll	6 ft 8 in (2.03 m)	241 lb (109 kg)	Jr	Aurora, CO
F	33	Gary Ware	6 ft 9 in (2.06 m)	245 lb (111 kg)	Jr	Detroit, MI
F	42	Matt Kiefer	6 ft 10 in (2.08 m)	233 lb (106 kg)	Jr	Evansville, IN
	45	Charles Davis	6 ft 6 in (1.98 m)	263 lb (119 kg)	Fr	Fraser, MI

Head coach

Gene Keady (Kansas State)

Assistant coach(es)

Matt Painter (Purdue)
Cuonzo Martin (Purdue)
Paul Lusk (Southern Illinois)
Todd Foster (Purdue)

Legend

- (C) Team captain
- (S) Suspended
- (I) Ineligible
- (W) Walk-on
- Injured
- Current redshirt

Roster
Last update: 2024-09-26

== Schedule ==
Date time, TV	Rank^{#}	Opponent^{#}	Result	Record	Site city, state
November 19*		at Miami (OH)	L 71–81	0–1	Millett Hall; Oxford, OH
November 23*		Detroit Mercy	W 66–56	1–1	Mackey Arena; West Lafayette, IN
November 27*		vs. Cincinnati; Wooden Tradition	L 59–79	1–2	Conseco Fieldhouse; Indianapolis, IN
November 29*		at No. 17 N.C. State; ACC-Big Ten Challenge	L 53–60	1–3	RBC Center; Raleigh, NC
December 3*; 5:00 p.m.		Memphis	L 52–61	1–4	Mackey Arena; West Lafayette, IN
December 8*		Oklahoma	L 48–66	1–5	Mackey Arena; West Lafayette, IN
December 11*		Colorado State	W 69–68	2–5	Mackey Arena; West Lafayette, IN
December 18*		vs. Evansville; Boilermaker Blockbuster	W 62–61	3–5	Conseco Fieldhouse; Indianapolis, IN
December 30*		Baylor	L 72–73	3–6	Mackey Arena; West Lafayette, IN
January 2*		Eastern Illinois	W 87–67	4–6	Mackey Arena; West Lafayette, IN
January 5; 2:00 p.m.		Wisconsin	L 68–77	4–7 (0–1)	Mackey Arena; West Lafayette, IN
January 8		No. 1 Illinois	L 59–68	4–8 (0–2)	Mackey Arena; West Lafayette, IN
January 12		at Minnesota	L 52–63	4–9 (0–3)	Williams Arena; Minneapolis, MN
January 15		Indiana	L 73–75 ^{2OT}	4–10 (0–4)	Mackey Arena; West Lafayette, IN
January 18		at No. 19 Michigan St.	L 64–71	4–11 (0–5)	Breslin Events Center; East Lansing, MI
January 22		at No. 23 Iowa	L 57–71	4–12 (0–6)	Carver-Hawkeye Arena; Iowa City, IA
January 26*		Milwaukee	L 68–73	4–13 (0–6)	Mackey Arena; West Lafayette, IN
January 30		Michigan	W 84–55	5–13 (1–6)	Mackey Arena; West Lafayette, IN
February 2		at Ohio State	L 65–75	5–14 (1–7)	Value City Arena; Columbus, OH
February 5		at Northwestern	L 61–67	5–15 (1–8)	Welsh-Ryan Arena; Evanston, IL
February 9		Penn State	W 77–50	6–15 (2–8)	Mackey Arena; West Lafayette, IN
February 16		Iowa	W 66–63	7–15 (3–8)	Mackey Arena; West Lafayette, IN
February 19		No. 11 Michigan State	L 57–68	7–16 (3–9)	Mackey Arena; West Lafayette, IN
February 22		at Indiana	L 62–79	7–17 (3–10)	Assembly Hall; Bloomington, IN
February 26		Minnesota	L 57–59	7–18 (3–11)	Mackey Arena; West Lafayette, IN
March 3		at No. 1 Illinois	L 50–84	7–19 (3–12)	Assembly Hall; Champaign, IL
March 5		at No. 23 Wisconsin	L 52–64	7–20 (3–13)	Kohl Center; Madison, WI
March 10	(10)	vs. (7) Iowa; Big Ten Tournament	L 52–71	7–21	United Center; Chicago, IL
*Non-conference game. ^{#}Rankings from AP Poll. (#) Tournament seedings in parentheses.
