= 2004–05 Michigan State Spartans men's basketball team =

American college basketball season

2004–05 Michigan State Spartans men's basketball

NCAA tournament, Final Four
- Conference: Big Ten Conference

Ranking
- Coaches: No. 4
- AP: No. 15
- Record: 26–7 (13–3 Big Ten)
- Head coach: Tom Izzo (10th season)
- Assistant coaches: Mark Montgomery (4th season); Doug Wojcik (2nd season); Dwayne Stephens (2nd season)
- Captains: Alan Anderson; Tim Bograkos; Chris Hill; Kelvin Torbert
- Home arena: Breslin Center

2004–05 Big Ten Conference men's basketball standings
	Conf.				Overall
Team	W		L	PCT	W		L	PCT
No. 1 Illinois †	15	–	1	.938	37	–	2	.949
No. 15 Michigan State	13	–	3	.813	26	–	6	.813
No. 20 Wisconsin	11	–	5	.688	25	–	9	.735
Indiana	10	–	6	.625	15	–	14	.517
Minnesota	10	–	6	.625	21	–	11	.656
Ohio State	8	–	8	.500	20	–	12	.625
Iowa	7	–	9	.438	21	–	12	.636
Northwestern	6	–	10	.375	15	–	16	.484
Michigan	4	–	12	.250	13	–	18	.419
Purdue	3	–	13	.188	7	–	21	.250
Penn State	1	–	15	.063	7	–	23	.233
† 2005 Big Ten tournament winner As of March 15, 2005; Rankings from AP Poll

The 2004–05 Michigan State Spartans men's basketball team represented Michigan State University in the 2004–05 NCAA Division I men's basketball season. The Spartans, led by 10th-year head coach Tom Izzo, played their home games at the Breslin Center in East Lansing, Michigan and were members of the Big Ten Conference. MSU finished the season 26–7, 13–3 to finish in second place in the Big Ten. They received a bid to the NCAA tournament for the eighth consecutive year and advanced to the Final Four before losing to eventual National Champion North Carolina.

== Previous season ==
The Spartans finished the 2003–04 season 18–12, 12–4 in Big Ten play to finish in third place. They lost in the semifinals of the Big Ten tournament to Wisconsin. They received a No. 7 seed in the NCAA tournament, their seventh straight trip to the Tournament, and lost in the First Round to Nevada

== Season summary ==
The Spartans were led by senior Alan Anderson (13.2 points and 5.6 rebounds per game), juniors Maurice Ager (14.1 points per game) and Paul Davis (12.3 points and 8.0 rebounds per game), and sophomore Shannon Brown (10.9 points per game).

They began the season ranked No. 13 in the country. The Spartans struggled early in the non-conference schedule, beginning 3–2 with losses to No. 10 Duke in the ACC-Big Ten Challenge and George Washington in the BB&T Classic. MSU won their remaining non-conference games to finish the non-conference schedule with a record of 8–2 and ranked No. 20 in the country.

The Spartans cruised through the Big Ten, only losing three games, including a loss to No. 1 Illinois and finished second in conference to Illinois. MSU finished the regular season with a 13–3 conference record and 22–5 overall while being ranked No. 13 in the country. The Spartans lost in the quarterfinals in the Big Ten tournament to Iowa.

Michigan State received an at-large bid as a No. 5 seed in the Austin Regional of the NCAA tournament, their eighth straight appearance in the Tournament under Tom Izzo. After having exited in the First Round the prior year, the Spartans faced Old Dominion in the First Round in the dreaded 5 vs. 12 seed matchup. The Spartans trailed by five at half time, 42–37, but rallied to pull out the victory, 89–81. In the Second Round, MSU faced No. 13 seed Vermont. Led by Maurice Ager's 19 points, the Spartans won 72–61 to advance to the Sweet Sixteen for the sixth time in eight years.

In the Sweet Sixteen, the Spartans beat No. 3-ranked and No. 1-seeded Duke, which MSU had not defeated since 1958. After a first half which saw the score tied at 32, MSU pulled out a rugged victory to advance to the Elite Eight, winning 78–68 behind Paul Davis' 20 points and 12 rebounds. The win marked Izzo's first and only win over Duke's Mike Krzyzewski until the Elite Eight victory over #1 seeded Duke in 2019.

In the Elite Eight, MSU faced No. 7-ranked and No. 2-seeded Kentucky on Easter Sunday. The Spartans trailed 37–33 after the first half, but rallied to take the lead by eight with over five minutes remaining in regulation. However, Kentucky rallied to within three with seconds remaining. After missing two attempts to tie the game, Patrick Sparks got a desperation shot off with less than second remaining. After bouncing four times on the rim, the ball went through the hoop for a basket, but officials had to review the replay to determine if his foot was on the three-point line. After a five-minute review, Kentucky was given credit for the three to move the game to overtime. Both teams only managed six points in the overtime period, scoring none in the final minute to force double overtime. On the strength of free throw shooting in the second overtime, the Spartans pulled out the win, 94–88.

The win meant the Spartans advanced to their fourth Final Four in seven years. With Illinois also advancing to the Final Four to face Louisville, the Big Ten had two teams in the Final Four for the first time since 2000 when Michigan State defeated Wisconsin on the way to the National Championship.

No. 2-ranked and No. 1-seeded North Carolina loomed as the opponent for MSU in the Final Four. MSU took the halftime lead at 38–33, but North Carolina's Sean May scored 22 points and Spartans were outscored by 19 in the second half, losing 87–71.

== Roster ==
2004–05 Michigan State Spartans men's basketball team
Players
Coaches

Pos.	#	Name	Height	Weight	Year	Previous school	Hometown
C	0	Idong Ibok	6 ft 10 in (2.08 m)	265 lb (120 kg)	Fr	Montverde Academy	Montverde, Florida
G	3	Shannon Brown	6 ft 3 in (1.91 m)	200 lb (91 kg)	So	Proviso East H.S.	Maywood, Illinois
G	5	Chris Hill	6 ft 3 in (1.91 m)	190 lb (86 kg)	Sr	Lawrence North H.S.	Indianapolis, Indiana
PG	12	Drew Neitzel	6 ft 0 in (1.83 m)	170 lb (77 kg)	Fr	Wyoming Park H.S.	Wyoming, Michigan
PG	13	Maurice Ager	6 ft 4 in (1.93 m)	180 lb (82 kg)	Jr	Crockett Vocational Tech	Detroit, Michigan
C	14	Goran Suton	6 ft 10 in (2.08 m)	246 lb (112 kg)	Fr	Everett H.S.	Lansing, Michigan
F	15	Alan Anderson	6 ft 6 in (1.98 m)	220 lb (100 kg)	Sr	De la Salle H.S.	Minneapolis, Minnesota
G	23	Kelvin Torbert	6 ft 4 in (1.93 m)	215 lb (98 kg)	Sr	Northwestern H.S.	Flint, Michigan
G	30	Tim Bograkos	6 ft 2 in (1.88 m)	190 lb (86 kg)	RS Sr	Central H.S.	Flint, Michigan
C	34	Drew Naymick	6 ft 10 in (2.08 m)	235 lb (107 kg)	So	North Muskegon H.S.	North Muskegon, Michigan
C	40	Paul Davis	6 ft 11 in (2.11 m)	240 lb (109 kg)	Jr	Rochester H.S.	Rochester Hills, Michigan
PF	42	Marquise Gray	6 ft 8 in (2.03 m)	220 lb (100 kg)	Fr	Beecher H.S.	Flint, Michigan
F	43	Andy Harvey	6 ft 5 in (1.96 m)	200 lb (91 kg)	Sr	Escanaba Area Public H.S.	Escanaba, Michigan
F	50	Delco Rowley	6 ft 8 in (2.03 m)	240 lb (109 kg)	RS So	Arlington H.S.	Indianapolis, Indiana
G	35	Joshua Dubbeld	6 ft 10 in (2.08 m)	190 lb (86 kg)	Fr	Alpena H.S	Flint, Michigan

Head coach

- Tom Izzo (Northern Michigan)

Assistant coach(es)

- Doug Wojcik (Navy)
- Dwayne Stephens (Michigan State)
- Mark Montgomery (Michigan State)

Legend

- (C) Team captain
- (S) Suspended
- (I) Ineligible
- (W) Walk-on
- Injured
- Current redshirt

Roster
Last update: 2010-11-07

== Schedule and results ==
Date time, TV	Rank^{#}	Opponent^{#}	Result	Record	Site city, state
Exhibition
Nov 19, 2004*; 7:05 pm	No. 13	Grand Valley State	W 77–62		Breslin Center; East Lansing, MI
Nov 10, 2004*; 4:00 pm	No. 13	Northern Michigan	W 98–56		Breslin Center (14,759); East Lansing, MI
Regular season
Nov 19, 2004*; 8:05 pm	No. 13	Florida A&M	W 104–72	1–0	Breslin Center (14,759); East Lansing, MI
Nov 23, 2004*; 8:05 pm	No. 10	Green Bay	W 104–46	2–0	Breslin Center (14,759); East Lansing, MI
Nov 27, 2004*; 12:05 pm	No. 10	Nicholls State	W 102–52	3–0	Breslin Center (14,759); East Lansing, MI
Nov 30, 2004*; 9:00 pm	No. 10	at No. 9 Duke; Big Ten - ACC Challenge	L 74–81	3–1	Cameron Indoor Stadium (9,314); Durham, NC
Dec 4, 2004*; 3:30 pm	No. 11	George Washington; BB&T Classic semifinals	L 83–96	3–2	MCI Center (13,104); Washington, DC
Dec 5, 2004*; 12:30 pm	No. 11	vs. George Mason; BB&T Classic third place game	W 66–60	4–2	MCI Center; Washington, DC
Dec 11, 2004*; 3:50 pm	No. 20	vs. Stanford; Spartan Clash	W 78–53	5–2	The Palace of Auburn Hills (20,067); Auburn Hills, MI
Dec 18, 2004*	No. 21	Delaware State	W 63–45	6–2	Breslin Center; East Lansing, MI
Dec 21, 2004*; 9:00 pm	No. 23	UCLA	W 76–64	7–2	Breslin Center (14,759); East Lansing, MI
Dec 29, 2004*; 7:00 pm	No. 23	North Carolina-Asheville	W 98–63	8–2	Breslin Center (14,759); East Lansing, MI
Jan 5, 2005; 7:00 pm	No. 20	Penn State	W 84–58	9–2 (1–0)	Bryce Jordan Center (5,637); State College, PA
Jan 8, 2005; 2:07 pm	No. 20	Northwestern	W 87–58	10–2 (2–0)	Breslin Center (14,759); East Lansing, MI
Jan 16, 2005; 12:30 pm	No. 15	Wisconsin	L 59–62	10–3 (2–1)	Kohl Center (17,142); Madison, WI
Jan 18, 2005; 7:00 pm	No. 19	Purdue	W 71–64	11–3 (3–1)	Breslin Center (14,759); East Lansing, MI
Jan 22, 2005; 3:30 pm	No. 19	Minnesota	W 69–55	12–3 (4–1)	Williams Arena (12,200); Minneapolis, MN
Jan 28, 2005; 7:00 pm	No. 15	Michigan; Rivalry	W 64–53	13–3 (5–1)	Breslin Center (14,759); East Lansing, MI
Jan 29, 2005*; 8:00 pm	No. 15	Oakland	W 92–75	14–3	Breslin Center (14,759); East Lansing, MI
Feb 1, 2005; 7:00 pm	No. 12	No. 1 Illinois	L 68–81	14–4 (5–2)	Breslin Center (14,759); East Lansing, MI
Feb 5, 2005; 1:32 pm	No. 12	Iowa	W 75–64	15–4 (6–2)	Carver-Hawkeye Arena (15,500); Iowa City, IA
Feb 9, 2005; 8:00 pm	No. 13	Ohio State	W 83–69	16–4 (7–2)	Breslin Center (14,759); East Lansing, MI
Feb 12, 2005; 4:00 pm	No. 13	Michigan; Rivalry	W 64–59	17–4 (8–2)	Crisler Arena (13,751); Ann Arbor, MI
Feb 16, 2005; 7:00 pm	No. 13	Minnesota	W 81–62	18–4 (9–2)	Breslin Center (14,759); East Lansing, MI
Feb 19, 2005; 12:00 pm	No. 11	Purdue	W 68–57	19–4 (10–2)	Mackey Arena (13,965); West Lafayette, IN
Feb 24, 2005; 7:00 pm	No. 10	No. 20 Wisconsin	W 77–64	20–4 (11–2)	Breslin Center (14,759); East Lansing, MI
Feb 27, 2005; 12:05 pm	No. 10	Indiana	L 74–78 ^{OT}	20–5 (11–3)	Assembly Hall (17,311); Bloomington, IN
Mar 2, 2005; 7:00 pm	No. 14	Northwestern	W 69–58	21–5 (12–3)	Welsh-Ryan Arena (6,147); Evanston, IL
Mar 5, 2005; 8:00 pm	No. 14	Penn State	W 90–64	22–5 (13–3)	Breslin Center (14,759); East Lansing, MI
Big Ten tournament
Mar 11, 2005; 5:40 pm	(2) No. 15	vs. (7) Iowa quarterfinals	L 69–71	22–6	United Center; Chicago, IL
NCAA tournament
Mar 18, 2005*; 9:50 pm, CBS	(5 Austin) No. 15	vs. (12 Austin) Old Dominion; First Round	W 89–81	23–6	DCU Center (13,009); Worcester, MA
Mar 20, 2005*; 2:45 pm, CBS	(5 Austin) No. 15	vs. (13 Austin) Vermont; Second Round	W 72–61	24–6	DCU Center (13,008); Worcester, MA
Mar 25, 2005*; 6:10 pm, CBS	(5 Austin) No. 15	vs. (1 Austin) No. 3 Duke; Sweet Sixteen	W 78–68	25–6	Frank Erwin Center; Austin TX
Mar 27, 2005*; 4:05 pm, CBS	(5 Austin) No. 15	vs. (2 Austin) No. 7 Kentucky; Elite Eight	W 94–88 ^{2OT}	26–6	Frank Erwin Center (16,239); Austin, TX
Apr 2, 2005*; 7:49 pm, CBS	(5 Austin) No. 15	vs. (1 Syracuse) No. 2 North Carolina; Final Four	L 71–87	26–7	Edward Jones Dome (47,754); St. Louis, MO
*Non-conference game. ^{#}Rankings from AP Poll. (#) Tournament seedings in parentheses. All times are in Eastern Time.

== Player statistics ==
Individual player statistics (Final)
		Scoring		Total FGs			3-point FGs			Free-Throws			Rebounds				
Player	GP	Pts	Avg	FG	FGA	Pct	3FG	3FA	Pct	FT	FTA	Pct	Tot	Avg	A	Stl	Blk
Aerts, Jason	8	7	0.9	3	3	1.000	0	0		1	2	.500	9	1.1	0	0	0
Ager, Maurice	33	464	14.1	150	315	.476	53	132	.402	111	135	.822	128	3.9	60	22	8
Anderson, Alan	33	437	13.5	149	268	.556	25	65	.385	114	130	.877	184	5.6	56	32	7
Bograkos, Tim	33	50	1.5	19	39	.487	3	12	.250	9	14	.643	44	1.3	27	19	2
Brown, Shannon	33	361	10.9	126	282	.447	31	94	.330	78	98	.848	104	3.2	57	41	5
Davis, Paul	32	392	12.3	157	290	.541	1	8	.125	77	115	.670	257	8.0	50	35	20
Hamo, Anthony	12	0	0.0	0	3	.000	0	1	.000	0	1	.000	1	0.1	0	0	0
Harvey, Andy	13	4	0.3	1	7	.143	0	3	.000	2	3	.667	5	0.4	0	0	1
Hill, Chris	33	291	8.8	99	239	.414	61	167	.365	32	43	.744	60	1.8	140	44	1
Naymick, Drew	29	44	1.5	17	30	.567	0	0		10	16	.625	56	1.9	9	6	16
Neitzel, Drew	33	115	3.5	43	113	.381	16	49	.327	13	20	.650	24	0.7	97	16	0
Rowley, Delco	29	52	1.8	19	40	.475	0	0		14	20	.700	65	2.2	8	9	7
Tobert, Kelvin	33	314	9.5	109	214	.509	29	84	.345	67	81	.827	97	1.5	50	23	13
Trannon, Matt	26	59	2.3	22	32	.688	0	0		15	27	.556	87	3.3	11	11	7

Legend
GP	Games played	Avg	Average per game
FG	Field-goals made	FGA	Field-goal attempts
Blk	Blocks	Stl	Steals	A	Assists

== Rankings ==
Ranking movement Legend: ██ Increase in ranking. ██ Decrease in ranking. (RV) Received votes but unranked. (NR) Not ranked.
Poll	Pre	Wk 2	Wk 3	Wk 4	Wk 5	Wk 6	Wk 7	Wk 8	Wk 9	Wk 10	Wk 11	Wk 12	Wk 13	Wk 14	Wk 15	Wk 16	Wk 17	Final
AP	13	10	11	20	21	23	23	20	15	19	15	12	13	11	10	14	15	N/A*
Coaches	10	9	9	16	18	20	20	19	12	16	13	10	12	10	9	12	10	5

*AP does not release post-NCAA tournament rankings

== Awards and honors ==
- Alan Anderson – All Big Ten Second Team (Media), All Big Ten Third Team (Coaches)
- Alan Anderson – USBWA All-District Team
- Maurice Ager – All Big Ten Second Team (Coaches), All Big Ten Third Team (Media)
- Paul Davis – All Big Ten Third Team
- Shannon Brown – All Big Ten Honorable Mention (Coaches)
- Drew Neitzel – All Big Ten All-Freshman Team

== See also ==
2004–05 Michigan State Spartans women's basketball team
