= 2004–05 Indiana Hoosiers men's basketball team =

American college basketball season

2004–05 Indiana Hoosiers men's basketball

National Invitation Tournament, First round
- Conference: Big Ten Conference
- Record: 15–14 (10–6 Big Ten)
- Head coach: Mike Davis (5th season)
- Assistant coaches: Donnie Marsh (1st season); Kerry Rupp (1st season)
- Home arena: Assembly Hall

2004–05 Big Ten Conference men's basketball standings
	Conf.				Overall
Team	W		L	PCT	W		L	PCT
No. 1 Illinois †	15	–	1	.938	37	–	2	.949
No. 15 Michigan State	13	–	3	.813	26	–	6	.813
No. 20 Wisconsin	11	–	5	.688	25	–	9	.735
Indiana	10	–	6	.625	15	–	14	.517
Minnesota	10	–	6	.625	21	–	11	.656
Ohio State	8	–	8	.500	20	–	12	.625
Iowa	7	–	9	.438	21	–	12	.636
Northwestern	6	–	10	.375	15	–	16	.484
Michigan	4	–	12	.250	13	–	18	.419
Purdue	3	–	13	.188	7	–	21	.250
Penn State	1	–	15	.063	7	–	23	.233
† 2005 Big Ten tournament winner As of March 15, 2005; Rankings from AP Poll

The 2004–05 Indiana Hoosiers men's basketball team represented Indiana University in the 2004–2005 college basketball season. Their head coach was Mike Davis, who was in his fifth season. The team played its home games at Assembly Hall in Bloomington, Indiana, and was a member of the Big Ten Conference.

Indiana finished the season with an overall record of 15–14 and a conference record of 10–6, finishing in 4th place in the Big Ten Conference. After missing out on the NCAA tournament for the second consecutive year, Indiana was invited to play in the NIT. However, IU lost in the first round, which ended their season.

== 2004–05 Roster ==
No.	Name	Position	Ht.	Year	Hometown
2	James Hardy	F	6–7	Fr.	Fort Wayne, Indiana
3	D. J. White	F	6–9	Fr.	Tuscaloosa, Alabama
3	Patrick Ewing Jr.	F	6–8	So.	Marietta, Georgia
4	Bracey Wright	G	6–3	Jr.	The Colony, Texas
10	Roderick Wilmont	G	6–4	So.	Miramar, Florida
11	Errek Suhr	G	5–8	So.	Bloomington, Indiana
12	Donald Perry	G	6–2	Sr.	Tallulah, Louisiana
20	A. J. Ratliff	G	6–3	Fr.	Indianapolis, Indiana
21	Mark Johnson	G	6–2	Sr.	Oregon, Wisconsin
22	Marshall Strickland	G	6–2	Jr.	Mount Airy, Maryland
23	Sean Kline	F	6–8	Jr.	Huntington, Indiana
24	Robert Vaden	F	6–5	Fr.	Indianapolis, Indiana
33	Mike Roberts	F	6–9	Sr.	Eugene, Oregon
34	Adam Ahlfeld	G	6–0	Fr.	Indianapolis, Indiana
34	Ryan Tapak	G	6–2	Sr.	Indianapolis, Indiana

== Schedule and results ==
Date time, TV	Rank^{#}	Opponent^{#}	Result	Record	Site city, state
Regular season
11/23/2004*		Indiana State	W 56–52	1–0	Assembly Hall; Bloomington, Indiana
11/27/2004*		Western Illinois	W 64–60	2–0	Assembly Hall; Bloomington, Indiana
12/1/2004*; ESPN		No. 9 North Carolina; ACC – Big Ten Challenge	L 63–70	2–1	Assembly Hall; Bloomington, Indiana
12/4/2004*; CBS		at No. 7 Connecticut	L 69–74	2–2	Hartford Civic Center; Hartford, Connecticut
12/8/2004*		Notre Dame	L 45–55	2–3	Assembly Hall; Bloomington, Indiana
12/11/2004*; CBS		vs. No. 10 Kentucky; Indiana–Kentucky rivalry	L 58–73	2–4	Freedom Hall; Louisville, Kentucky
12/19/2004*		at Missouri	L 53–56	2–5	Mizzou Arena; Columbia, Missouri
12/22/2004*		Charlotte	L 73–74	2–6	Assembly Hall; Bloomington, Indiana
12/28/2004*		vs. Ball State	W 71–59	3–6	Conseco Fieldhouse; Indianapolis
12/31/2004*		Oral Roberts	W 69–68	4–6	Assembly Hall; Indianapolis
1/2/2005*		Furman	W 68–52	5–6	Assembly Hall; Bloomington, Indiana
1/5/2005		at Northwestern	L 52–73	5–7 (0–1)	Welsh-Ryan Arena; Evanston, Illinois
1/8/2005		Wisconsin	W 74–61	6–7 (1–1)	Assembly Hall; Bloomington, Indiana
1/15/2005		at Purdue; Rivalry/Crimson and Gold Cup	W 75–73	7–7 (2–1)	Mackey Arena; West Lafayette, Indiana
1/19/2005		Michigan	W 62–53	8–7 (3–1)	Assembly Hall; Bloomington, Indiana
1/22/2005		Ohio State	W 67–60	9–7 (4–1)	Assembly Hall; Bloomington, Indiana
1/26/2005		at Minnesota	L 65–70	9–8 (4–2)	Williams Arena; Minneapolis
1/29/2005		at Iowa	L 57–72	9–9 (4–3)	Carver–Hawkeye Arena; Iowa City, IA
2/2/2005		Penn State	W 68–63	10–9 (5–3)	Assembly Hall; Bloomington, Indiana
2/6/2005; CBS		at No. 1 Illinois; Rivalry	L 47–60	10–10 (5–4)	Assembly Hall; Champaign, Illinois
2/12/2005		Minnesota	W 71–56	11–10 (6–4)	Assembly Hall; Bloomington, Indiana
2/15/2005		at Ohio State	L 44–57	11–11 (6–5)	Value City Arena; Columbus, Ohio
2/20/2005; CBS		at Michigan	W 70–63	12–11 (7–5)	Crisler Arena; Ann Arbor, Michigan
2/22/2005		Purdue; Rivalry/Crimson and Gold Cup	W 79–62	13–11 (8–5)	Assembly Hall; Bloomington, Indiana
2/27/2005; CBS		Michigan State	W 78–74	14–11 (9–5)	Assembly Hall; Bloomington, Indiana
3/1/2005		at Wisconsin	L 60–62	14–12 (9–6)	Kohl Center; Madison, Wisconsin
3/5/2005		Northwestern	W 77–55	15–12 (10–6)	Assembly Hall; Bloomington, Indiana
Big Ten tournament
3/11/2005		vs. Minnesota; Quarterfinals	L 55–71	15–13 (10–6)	United Center; Chicago
NIT
3/16/2005*		Vanderbilt; First Round	L 60–67	15–14 (10–6)	Assembly Hall; Bloomington, Indiana
*Non-conference game. ^{#}Rankings from AP Poll. (#) Tournament seedings in parentheses.
