= 2004–05 Minnesota Golden Gophers men's basketball team =

American college basketball season

2004–05 Minnesota Golden Gophers men's basketball

NCAA tournament, First Round
- Conference: Big Ten Conference
- Record: 21–11 (10–6 Big Ten)
- Head coach: Dan Monson (6th season)
- Assistant coaches: Vic Couch; Jim Molinari; Bill Walker
- Home arena: Williams Arena

2004–05 Big Ten Conference men's basketball standings
	Conf.				Overall
Team	W		L	PCT	W		L	PCT
No. 1 Illinois †	15	–	1	.938	37	–	2	.949
No. 15 Michigan State	13	–	3	.813	26	–	6	.813
No. 20 Wisconsin	11	–	5	.688	25	–	9	.735
Indiana	10	–	6	.625	15	–	14	.517
Minnesota	10	–	6	.625	21	–	11	.656
Ohio State	8	–	8	.500	20	–	12	.625
Iowa	7	–	9	.438	21	–	12	.636
Northwestern	6	–	10	.375	15	–	16	.484
Michigan	4	–	12	.250	13	–	18	.419
Purdue	3	–	13	.188	7	–	21	.250
Penn State	1	–	15	.063	7	–	23	.233
† 2005 Big Ten tournament winner As of March 15, 2005; Rankings from AP Poll

The 2004–05 Minnesota Golden Gophers men's basketball team represented the University of Minnesota during the college basketball season of 2004–05. The team's head coach, Dan Monson, was in his sixth season with the Gophers and the team played their home games at Williams Arena in Minneapolis, Minnesota and are members of the Big Ten Conference.

== Roster ==
2004–05 Minnesota Golden Gophers men's basketball team
Players
Coaches

Pos.	#	Name	Height	Weight	Year	Hometown
G	2	Ryan Saunders	6 ft 1 in (1.85 m)	190 lb (86 kg)	Fr	Wayzata, Minnesota
G/F	15	Vincent Grier	6 ft 5 in (1.96 m)	205 lb (93 kg)	Jr	Charlotte, North Carolina

Head coach

- Dan Monson (Idaho)

Assistant coach(es)

Legend

- (C) Team captain
- (S) Suspended
- (I) Ineligible
- (W) Walk-on
- Injured
- Current redshirt

Roster

== Schedule and results ==
Date time, TV	Rank^{#}	Opponent^{#}	Result	Record	Site city, state
Regular Season
Nov 24, 2004*		vs. Furman; Great Alaska Shootout	W 84–69	2–0	Sullivan Arena; Anchorage, Alaska
Nov 26, 2004*		vs. No. 19 Alabama; Great Alaska Shootout	L 72–78	2–1	Sullivan Arena; Anchorage, Alaska
Nov 27, 2004*		vs. Oklahoma; Great Alaska Shootout	L 54–67	2–2	Sullivan Arena; Anchorage, Alaska
Big Ten Regular Season
Mar 2, 2005		at Penn State	W 73–69	20–9 (10–6)	Bryce Jordan Center; University Park, Pennsylvania
Big Ten tournament
Mar 11, 2005*		vs. Indiana; Quarterfinals	W 71–55	21–9	United Center; Chicago, Illinois
Mar 12, 2005*		vs. No. 1 Illinois; Semifinals	L 56–64	21–10	United Center; Chicago, Illinois
NCAA tournament
Mar 18, 2005*	(8 E)	vs. (9 E) Iowa State; First round	L 53–64	21–11	Charlotte Coliseum; Charlotte, North Carolina
*Non-conference game. ^{#}Rankings from AP Poll. (#) Tournament seedings in parentheses.
