= 2004–05 Iowa Hawkeyes men's basketball team =

American college basketball season

2004–05 Iowa Hawkeyes men's basketball

NCAA men's Division I tournament, First Round
- Conference: Big Ten Conference
- Record: 21–12 (7–9 Big Ten)
- Head coach: Steve Alford (6th season)
- Assistant coaches: Brian Jones; Greg Lansing
- MVPs: Greg Brunner; Jeff Horner
- Home arena: Carver–Hawkeye Arena

2004–05 Big Ten Conference men's basketball standings
	Conf.				Overall
Team	W		L	PCT	W		L	PCT
No. 1 Illinois †	15	–	1	.938	37	–	2	.949
No. 15 Michigan State	13	–	3	.813	26	–	6	.813
No. 20 Wisconsin	11	–	5	.688	25	–	9	.735
Indiana	10	–	6	.625	15	–	14	.517
Minnesota	10	–	6	.625	21	–	11	.656
Ohio State	8	–	8	.500	20	–	12	.625
Iowa	7	–	9	.438	21	–	12	.636
Northwestern	6	–	10	.375	15	–	16	.484
Michigan	4	–	12	.250	13	–	18	.419
Purdue	3	–	13	.188	7	–	21	.250
Penn State	1	–	15	.063	7	–	23	.233
† 2005 Big Ten tournament winner As of March 15, 2005; Rankings from AP Poll

The 2004–05 Iowa Hawkeyes men's basketball team represented the University of Iowa as members of the Big Ten Conference during the 2004–05 NCAA Division I men's basketball season. The team was led by sixth-year head coach Steve Alford and played their home games at Carver–Hawkeye Arena. They finished the season 21–12 overall and 7–9 in Big Ten play. The Hawkeyes received an at-large bid to the NCAA tournament as #10 seed in the Austin Regional. The season ended with an opening round loss to #7 seed Cincinnati, 76–64.

== Roster ==
2004–05 Iowa Hawkeyes men's basketball team
Players
Coaches

Pos.	#	Name	Height	Weight	Year	Hometown
G	1	Adam Haluska	6 ft 5 in (1.96 m)	—	So	Carroll, Iowa
G	2	Jeff Horner	6 ft 3 in (1.91 m)	—	Jr	Mason City, Iowa
G	3	Pierre Pierce	6 ft 4 in (1.93 m)	—	Jr	Westmont, Illinois
F	5	Alex Thompson	6 ft 10 in (2.08 m)	—	Fr	Ames, Iowa
F	13	Justin Wieck	6 ft 6 in (1.98 m)	—	Jr	North Liberty, Iowa
F	23	Doug Thomas	6 ft 8 in (2.03 m)	—	Fr	Inglewood, California
G	25	Carlton Reed	6 ft 4 in (1.93 m)	—	Fr	Waterloo, Iowa
C	34	Erek Hansen	6 ft 11 in (2.11 m)	—	Jr	Bedford, Texas
G	35	Mike Henderson	6 ft 2 in (1.88 m)	—	So	Waterloo, Iowa
F	44	Greg Brunner	6 ft 7 in (2.01 m)	—	Jr	Charles City, Iowa
C	53	Seth Gorney	6 ft 11 in (2.11 m)	—	Fr	Vandalia, Ohio

Head coach

- Steve Alford (Indiana)

Assistant coach(es)

- Brian Jones (Northern Iowa)
- Greg Lansing (South Dakota)

Legend

- (C) Team captain
- (S) Suspended
- (I) Ineligible
- (W) Walk-on
- Injured
- Current redshirt

== Schedule/Results ==
Date time, TV	Rank^{#}	Opponent^{#}	Result	Record	Site city, state
Non-conference regular season
Nov 19, 2004*		Western Illinois	W 85–62	1–0	Carver–Hawkeye Arena; Iowa City, IA
Nov 22, 2004*		vs. No. 14 Louisville; Maui Invitational First Round	W 76–71	2–0	Lahaina Civic Center (2,500); Lahaina, HI
Nov 23, 2004*		vs. No. 15 Texas; Maui Invitational Semifinal	W 82–80	3–0	Lahaina Civic Center (2,500); Lahaina, HI
Nov 24, 2004*		vs. No. 11 North Carolina; Maui Invitational Championship	L 92–106	3–1	Lahaina Civic Center (2,500); Lahaina, HI
Nov 30, 2004*	No. 23	at Drake; Iowa Big Four	W 91–75	4–1	Knapp Center; Des Moines, IA
Dec 3, 2004*	No. 23	Centenary	W 88–53	5–1	Carver-Hawkeye Arena; Iowa City, Iowa
Dec 4, 2004*	No. 23	UNC Greensboro	W 83–58	6–1	Carver-Hawkeye Arena; Iowa City, Iowa
Dec 7, 2004*	No. 17	Northern Iowa	W 76–73	7–1	Carver-Hawkeye Arena; Iowa City, Iowa
Dec 10, 2004*	No. 17	Iowa State; Rivalry	W 70–63	8–1	Hilton Coliseum; Ames, Iowa
Dec 18, 2004*	No. 16	Western Carolina	W 88–75	9–1	Carver-Hawkeye Arena; Iowa City, Iowa
Dec 21, 2004*	No. 17	vs. Texas Tech	W 83–53	10–1	United Center; Chicago, Illinois
Dec 28, 2004*	No. 16	Air Force	W 73–63	11–1	Carver-Hawkeye Arena; Iowa City, Iowa
Dec 31, 2004*	No. 16	Saint Louis	W 67–58	12–1	Carver-Hawkeye Arena; Iowa City, IA
Big Ten Regular Season
Jan 5, 2005	No. 14	Michigan	L 63–65	12–2 (0–1)	Carver-Hawkeye Arena; Iowa City, Iowa
Jan 8, 2005	No. 14	at Ohio State	L 69–81	12–3 (0–2)	Value City Arena; Columbus, Ohio
Jan 15, 2005	No. 24	Minnesota	W 66–60	13–3 (1–2)	Carver-Hawkeye Arena; Notre Dame, Indiana
Jan 20, 2005	No. 23	at No. 1 Illinois	L 68–73 ^{OT}	13–4 (1–3)	Assembly Hall; Champaign, Illinois
Jan 22, 2005	No. 23	Purdue	W 71–57	14–4 (2–3)	Carver-Hawkeye Arena; Iowa City, Iowa
Jan 26, 2005	No. 23	at Northwestern	L 74–75 ^{OT}	14–5 (2–4)	Welsh-Ryan Arena; Evanston, Illinois
Jan 29, 2005	No. 23	Indiana	W 72–57	15–5 (3–4)	Carver-Hawkeye Arena; Iowa City, Iowa
Feb 5, 2005		No. 12 Michigan State	L 64–75	15–6 (3–5)	Carver-Hawkeye Arena; Iowa City, Iowa
Feb 9, 2005		at No. 20 Wisconsin	L 69–72	15–7 (3–6)	Kohl Center; Madison, Wisconsin
Feb 12, 2005		Northwestern	W 64–54	16–7 (4–6)	Carver-Hawkeye Arena; Iowa City, Iowa
Feb 16, 2005		at Purdue	L 63–66	16–8 (4–7)	Mackey Arena; West Lafayette, Indiana
Feb 19, 2005		No. 1 Illinois	L 65–75	16–9 (4–8)	Carver-Hawkeye Arena; Iowa City, Iowa
Feb 23, 2005		at Minnesota	L 57–65	16–10 (4–9)	Williams Arena; Minneapolis, Minnesota
Feb 26, 2005		at Penn State	W 78–56	17–10 (5–9)	Bryce Jordan Center; University Park, Pennsylvania
Mar 2, 2005		Ohio State	W 74–72	18–10 (6–9)	Carver-Hawkeye Arena; Iowa City, Iowa
Mar 5, 2005		at Michigan	W 74–72 ^{OT}	19–10 (7–9)	Crisler Arena; Ann Arbor, Michigan
Big Ten tournament
Mar 10, 2005*		vs. Purdue; Opening round	W 71–52	20–10	United Center; Chicago, IL
Mar 11, 2005*		vs. No. 13 Michigan State; Quarterfinals	W 71–69	21–10	United Center; Chicago, IL
Mar 12, 2005*		vs. No. 23 Wisconsin; Semifinals	L 56–59	21–11	United Center; Chicago, IL
NCAA tournament
Mar 17, 2005*	(10)	vs. (7) No. 23 Cincinnati; First Round	L 64–76	21–12	RCA Dome; Indianapolis, IN
*Non-conference game. ^{#}Rankings from AP poll. (#) Tournament seedings in parentheses.
