= 2004–05 Ohio State Buckeyes men's basketball team =

American college basketball season

2004–05 Ohio State Buckeyes men's basketball
- Conference: Big Ten
- Record: 20–12 (8–8 Big Ten)
- Head coach: Thad Matta (1st season)
- Assistant coaches: Alan Major; Dan Peters; John Groce
- Home arena: Value City Arena

2004–05 Big Ten Conference men's basketball standings
	Conf.				Overall
Team	W		L	PCT	W		L	PCT
No. 1 Illinois †	15	–	1	.938	37	–	2	.949
No. 15 Michigan State	13	–	3	.813	26	–	6	.813
No. 20 Wisconsin	11	–	5	.688	25	–	9	.735
Indiana	10	–	6	.625	15	–	14	.517
Minnesota	10	–	6	.625	21	–	11	.656
Ohio State	8	–	8	.500	20	–	12	.625
Iowa	7	–	9	.438	21	–	12	.636
Northwestern	6	–	10	.375	15	–	16	.484
Michigan	4	–	12	.250	13	–	18	.419
Purdue	3	–	13	.188	7	–	21	.250
Penn State	1	–	15	.063	7	–	23	.233
† 2005 Big Ten tournament winner As of March 15, 2005; Rankings from AP Poll

The 2004–05 Ohio State Buckeyes men's basketball team represented Ohio State University in the 2004–05 NCAA Division I men's basketball season. They were led by their first-year head coach, Thad Matta, and played their home game at the Value City Arena, in Columbus, Ohio as members of the Big Ten Conference. The Buckeyes finished the season 20–12, 8–8 in Big Ten play. They the 6th seed in the Big Ten tournament. They defeated Penn State in the first round before losing to Wisconsin in the quarterfinals. They were not given a bid for the NCAA tournament. The highlight of the season was beating Number 1 Illinois at home to give them their only loss of the regular season.

== Previous season ==
The Buckeyes finished the 2003-04 season 14–16, 6–10 in Big Ten play to finish in ninth place. They were defeated by Indiana in the first round of the Big Ten tournament

== Roster ==
2004–05 Ohio State Buckeyes men's basketball team
Players	Coaches
Pos. / # / Name / Height / Weight / Year / Previous school / Hometown	Head coach: Thad Matta (Butler); Assistant coach(es) Legend: (C) Team captain; (S) Suspended; (I) Ineligible; (W) Walk-on; Injured; Current redshirt; Roster; Last update: April 18, 2023

== Schedule and results ==
Date time, TV	Rank^{#}	Opponent^{#}	Result	Record	Site city, state
Exhibition
11/9/2004*		Northern Kentucky	W 77–67	–	Value City Arena; Columbus, OH
Regular season
11/15/2004*		Towson; Guardians Classic	W 74–53	1–0	Value City Arena; Columbus, OH
11/16/2004*		Robert Morris; Guardians Classic	W 82–50	2–0	Value City Arena; Columbus, OH
11/19/2004*		Delaware	W 74–49	3–0	Value City Arena; Columbus, OH
11/23/2004*		vs. Houston; Guardians Classic	W 78–61	4–0	Municipal Auditorium; Kansas City, MO
11/24/2004*		vs. Creighton; Guardians Classic	L 63–65 ^{OT}	4–1	Municipal Auditorium; Kansas City, MO
11/27/2004*		Chattanooga	W 84–67	5–1	Value City Arena; Columbus, OH
12/1/2004*		at Clemson; ACC–Big Ten Challenge	L 73–80	5–2	Littlejohn Coliseum; Clemson, SC
12/11/2004*		Portland State	W 78–54	6–2	Value City Arena; Columbus, OH
12/16/2004*		at Texas Tech	W 77–71	7–2	United Spirit Arena; Lubbock, TX
12/19/2004*		Morehead State	W 74–48	8–2	Value City Arena; Columbus, OH
12/22/2004*		Mercer	W 102–77	9–2	Value City Arena; Columbus, OH
12/28/2004*		New Hampshire	W 77–59	10–2	Value City Arena; Columbus, OH
12/31/2004*		Saint Joseph's	W 72–61	11–2	Value City Arena; Columbus, OH
1/5/2005; 9:05 pm, ESPN Plus		at No. 1 Illinois	L 65–84	11–3 (0–1)	Assembly Hall (16,618); Champaign, IL
1/8/2005		No. 14 Iowa	W 81–69	12–3 (1–1)	Value City Arena; Columbus, OH
1/11/2005; 7:00 pm, ESPN		at Wisconsin	L 66–72	12–4 (1–2)	Kohl Center; Madison, WI
1/15/2005*		at LSU	L 101–113 ^{2OT}	12–5	Maravich Assembly Center; Baton Rouge, LA
1/19/2005		Minnesota	L 56–60 ^{OT}	12–6 (1–3)	Value City Arena; Columbus, OH
1/22/2005		at Indiana	L 60–67	12–7 (1–4)	Assembly Hall; Bloomington, IN
1/26/2005		Penn State	W 68–62	13–7 (2–4)	Value City Arena; Columbus, OH
1/29/2005		at Northwestern	W 65–52	14–7 (3–4)	Welsh-Ryan Arena; Evanston, IL
2/2/2005		Purdue	W 75–65	15–7 (4–4)	Value City Arena; Columbus, OH
2/5/2005		Michigan	W 72–46	16–7 (5–4)	Value City Arena; Columbus, OH
2/9/2005; 8:00 pm		at No. 13 Michigan State	L 69–83	16–8 (5–5)	Breslin Center (14,759); East Lansing, MI
2/12/2005		at Penn State	W 66–56	17–8 (6–5)	Bryce Jordan Center; State College, PA
2/15/2005		Indiana	W 57–44	18–8 (7–5)	Value City Arena; Columbus, OH
2/19/2005		at Minnesota	L 50–52	18–9 (7–6)	Williams Arena; Minneapolis, MN
2/27/2005; 2:00 pm, ESPN		No. 20 Wisconsin	L 56–64	18–10 (7–7)	Value City Arena; Columbus, OH
3/2/2005		at Iowa	L 72–74	18–11 (7–8)	Carver–Hawkeye Arena; Iowa City, IA
3/6/2005; 1:00 pm, CBS		No. 1 Illinois	W 65–64	19–11 (8–8)	Value City Arena (19,200); Columbus, OH
Big Ten tournament
3/10/2005	(6)	vs. (11) Penn State; Opening Round	W 72–69	20–11	United Center; Chicago, IL
3/11/2005; 9:10 pm, ESPN	(6)	vs. (3) No. 23 Wisconsin; Quarterfinals	L 49–60	20–12	United Center; Chicago, IL
*Non-conference game. ^{#}Rankings from AP Poll. (#) Tournament seedings in parentheses. All times are in Eastern Time.
