= 2004–05 Wisconsin Badgers men's basketball team =

American college basketball season

2004–05 Wisconsin Badgers men's basketball

NCAA tournament, Elite Eight
- Conference: Big Ten Conference

Ranking
- Coaches: No. 10
- AP: No. 20
- Record: 25–9 (11–5 Big Ten)
- Head coach: Bo Ryan
- Associate head coach: Rob Jeter
- Assistant coaches: Greg Gard; Gary Close
- Home arena: Kohl Center

2004–05 Big Ten Conference men's basketball standings
	Conf.				Overall
Team	W		L	PCT	W		L	PCT
No. 1 Illinois †	15	–	1	.938	37	–	2	.949
No. 15 Michigan State	13	–	3	.813	26	–	6	.813
No. 20 Wisconsin	11	–	5	.688	25	–	9	.735
Indiana	10	–	6	.625	15	–	14	.517
Minnesota	10	–	6	.625	21	–	11	.656
Ohio State	8	–	8	.500	20	–	12	.625
Iowa	7	–	9	.438	21	–	12	.636
Northwestern	6	–	10	.375	15	–	16	.484
Michigan	4	–	12	.250	13	–	18	.419
Purdue	3	–	13	.188	7	–	21	.250
Penn State	1	–	15	.063	7	–	23	.233
† 2005 Big Ten tournament winner As of March 15, 2005; Rankings from AP Poll

The 2004–05 Wisconsin Badgers men's basketball team represented University of Wisconsin–Madison. The head coach was Bo Ryan, coaching his fourth season with the Badgers. The team played its home games at the Kohl Center in Madison, Wisconsin, and is a member of the Big Ten Conference.

== Roster ==
2004–05 Wisconsin Badgers men's basketball team
Players
Coaches

Pos.	#	Name	Height	Weight	Year	Hometown
G	1	Sharif Chambliss (W)	6 ft 1 in (1.85 m)	185 lb (84 kg)	RS Sr	Racine, Wisconsin
F	4	Ray Nixon	6 ft 8 in (2.03 m)	215 lb (98 kg)	Jr	Whitefish Bay, Wisconsin
F/C	5	Jason Chappell	6 ft 10 in (2.08 m)	240 lb (109 kg)	RS So	New Berlin, Wisconsin
G	13	Clayton Hanson	6 ft 5 in (1.96 m)	195 lb (88 kg)	Sr	Reedsburg, Wisconsin
G	14	Tanner Bronson (W)	5 ft 11 in (1.8 m)	160 lb (73 kg)	Fr	Glendale, Wisconsin
C	21	Andreas Helmigk	6 ft 9 in (2.06 m)	245 lb (111 kg)	RS Jr	Klagenfurt
G	22	Michael Flowers	6 ft 2 in (1.88 m)	185 lb (84 kg)	Fr	Madison, Wisconsin
G	23	Kammron Taylor	6 ft 2 in (1.88 m)	175 lb (79 kg)	So	Minneapolis
F/C	32	Brian Butch	6 ft 11 in (2.11 m)	240 lb (109 kg)	RS Fr	Appleton, Wisconsin
G/F	33	DeAaron Williams (redshirt)	6 ft 4 in (1.93 m)	190 lb (86 kg)	Fr	Peoria, Illinois
C	34	Greg Stiemsma	6 ft 11 in (2.11 m)	245 lb (111 kg)	Fr	Randolph, Wisconsin
F	42	Alando Tucker	6 ft 5 in (1.96 m)	205 lb (93 kg)	RS So	Lockport, Illinois
F	44	Zach Morley	6 ft 8 in (2.03 m)	220 lb (100 kg)	Sr	Maryville, Missouri
F	54	Mike Wilkinson	6 ft 8 in (2.03 m)	240 lb (109 kg)	RS Sr	Blue Mounds, Wisconsin

Head coach

- Bo Ryan (Wilkes)

Assistant coach(es)

- Rob Jeter (UW-Platteville)
- Greg Gard (UW-Platteville)
- Gary Close (Arizona State)

Legend

- (C) Team captain
- (S) Suspended
- (I) Ineligible
- (W) Walk-on
- Injured
- Current redshirt

Roster
Last update: 2014-1-6

== Schedule ==
Date time, TV	Rank^{#}	Opponent^{#}	Result	Record	Site city, state
Regular Season
11/20/2004*; 7:30 pm	No. 21	Penn	W 77–44	1–0	Kohl Center; Madison, Wisconsin
11/23/2004*; 7:00 pm	No. 20	UC Santa Barbara	W 72–61	2–0	Kohl Center; Madison, Wisconsin
11/27/2004*; 9:00 pm	No. 20	at Pepperdine	L 61–75	2–1	Firestone Fieldhouse; Malibu, California
11/30/2004*; 8:30 pm, ESPN2	No. 25	No. 12 Maryland; ACC–Big Ten Challenge	W 69–64	3–1	Kohl Center; Madison, Wisconsin
12/04/2004*; 6:30 pm	No. 25	at Rutgers	W 70–62	4–1	Louis Brown Athletic Center; New Brunswick, New Jersey
12/07/2004*; 7:00 pm, WPT	No. 24	Green Bay	W 65–55	5–1	Kohl Center; Madison, Wisconsin
12/11/2004*; 7:30 pm, UPN	No. 24	at Marquette	L 54–63	5–2	Bradley Center; Milwaukee
12/15/2004*; 7:00 pm, ESPN		Milwaukee	W 66–37	6–2	Kohl Center; Madison, Wisconsin
12/23/2004*; 7:00 pm		UNC Greensboro	W 85–53	7–2	Kohl Center; Madison, Wisconsin
12/27/2004*; 7:00 pm, WPT		Western Carolina	W 89–49	8–2	Kohl Center; Madison, Wisconsin
12/29/2004*; 6:30 pm, ESPN2		No. 18 Alabama	W 76–62	9–2	Kohl Center; Madison, Wisconsin
1/05/2005; 8:00 pm, ESPN	No. 24	at Purdue	W 77–68	10–2 (1–0)	Mackey Arena; West Lafayette, Indiana
1/08/2005; 7:00 pm, ESPN		at Indiana	L 61–74	10–3 (1–1)	Assembly Hall; Bloomington, Indiana
1/11/2005; 6:00 pm, ESPN		Ohio State	W 72–66	11–3 (2–1)	Kohl Center; Madison, Wisconsin
1/16/2005; 12:30 pm, CBS		No. 15 Michigan State	W 62–59	12–3 (3–1)	Kohl Center; Madison, Wisconsin
1/22/2005; 11:17 am, ESPN+	No. 24	at Michigan	W 72–61	13–3 (4–1)	Crisler Arena; Ann Arbor, Michigan
1/25/2005; 8:00 pm, ESPN	No. 18	No. 1 Illinois	L 65–75	13–4 (4–2)	Kohl Center; Madison, Wisconsin
1/29/2005; 7:00 pm, ESPN	No. 18	at Penn State	W 76–50	14–4 (5–2)	Bryce Jordan Center; University Park, Pennsylvania
2/02/2005; 7:00 pm, ESPN	No. 19	Northwestern	W 73–58	15–4 (6–2)	Kohl Center; Madison, Wisconsin
2/05/2005; 11:00 am, ESPN2	No. 19	at Minnesota	L 50–60	15–5 (6–3)	Williams Arena; Minneapolis, Minnesota
2/09/2005; 7:00 pm, ESPN	No. 20	Iowa	W 72–69	16–5 (7–3)	Kohl Center; Madison, Wisconsin
2/12/2005; 12:00 pm, CBS	No. 20	at No. 1 Illinois	L 59–70	16–6 (7–4)	Assembly Hall; Champaign, Illinois
2/16/2005; 8:00 pm, ESPN	No. 20	Michigan	W 76–50	17–6 (8–4)	Kohl Center; Madison, Wisconsin
2/24/2005; 6:00 pm, ESPN	No. 20	at No. 10 Michigan State	L 64–77	17–7 (8–5)	Breslin Center; East Lansing, Michigan
2/27/2005; 1:00 pm, ESPN	No. 20	at Ohio State	W 64–56	18–7 (9–5)	Value City Arena; Columbus, Ohio
3/01/2005; 8:00 pm, ESPN	No. 23	Indiana	W 62–60	19–7 (10–5)	Kohl Center; Madison, Wisconsin
3/05/2005; 1:32 pm, ESPN+	No. 23	Purdue	W 64–52	20–7 (11–5)	Kohl Center; Madison, Wisconsin
Big Ten tournament
3/11/2005; 8:10 pm, ESPN	No. 23	vs. Ohio State; Big Ten tournament – Quarterfinals	W 60–49	21–7	United Center; Chicago, Illinois
3/12/2005; 3:05 pm, CBS	No. 23	vs. Iowa; Big Ten tournament – Semifinals	W 59–56	22–7	United Center; Chicago
3/13/2005; 2:30 pm, CBS	No. 23	vs. No. 1 Illinois; Big Ten tournament – Finals	L 43–54	22–8	United Center; Chicago
NCAA tournament
3/18/2005*; 6:20 pm, CBS	(6) No. 20	vs. (11) Northern Iowa; First Round	W 57–52	23–8	Ford Center; Oklahoma City
3/20/2005*; 3:50 pm, CBS	(6) No. 20	vs. (14) Bucknell; Second Round	W 71–62	24–8	Ford Center; Oklahoma City
3/25/2005*; 6:27 pm, CBS	(6) No. 20	vs. (10) NC State; Sweet Sixteen	W 65–56	25–8	Carrier Dome; Syracuse, New York
3/27/2005*; 1:40 pm, CBS	(6) No. 20	vs. (1) North Carolina; Elite Eight	L 82–88	25–9	Carrier Dome; Syracuse, New York
*Non-conference game. ^{#}Rankings from AP Poll. (#) Tournament seedings in parentheses.
