= 2005 NCAA Men's Basketball All-Americans =

- Awarded for: 2004–05 NCAA Division I men's basketball season

The Consensus 2005 College Basketball All-American team, as determined by aggregating the results of four major All-American teams. To earn "consensus" status, a player must win honors from a majority of the following teams: the Associated Press, the USBWA, The Sporting News and the National Association of Basketball Coaches.

== 2005 Consensus All-America team ==
Consensus First Team
Player	Position	Class	Team
Andrew Bogut	C	Sophomore	Utah
Dee Brown	G	Junior	Illinois
Chris Paul	G	Sophomore	Wake Forest
J. J. Redick	G	Junior	Duke
Wayne Simien	F	Senior	Kansas
Hakim Warrick	F	Senior	Syracuse

Consensus Second Team
Player	Position	Class	Team
Ike Diogu	F	Junior	Arizona State
Luther Head	G	Senior	Illinois
Sean May	C	Junior	North Carolina
Salim Stoudamire	G	Senior	Arizona
Deron Williams	G	Junior	Illinois

== Individual All-America teams ==
All-America Team
All-America Team	First team		Second team		Third team	
All-America Team	Player	School	Player	School	Player	School
Associated Press	Andrew Bogut	Utah	Dee Brown	Illinois	Raymond Felton	North Carolina
Associated Press	Chris Paul	Wake Forest	Ike Diogu	Arizona State	Joey Graham	Oklahoma State
Associated Press	J. J. Redick	Duke	Luther Head	Illinois	Nate Robinson	Washington
Associated Press	Wayne Simien	Kansas	Sean May	North Carolina	Deron Williams	Illinois
Associated Press	Hakim Warrick	Syracuse	Salim Stoudamire	Arizona	Shelden Williams	Duke
USBWA	Andrew Bogut	Utah	Ike Diogu	Arizona State	No third team	
USBWA	Chris Paul	Wake Forest	Luther Head	Illinois	No third team	
USBWA	J. J. Redick	Duke	Sean May	North Carolina	No third team	
USBWA	Wayne Simien	Kansas	Salim Stoudamire	Arizona	No third team	
USBWA	Dee Brown	Illinois	Hakim Warrick	Syracuse	No third team	
NABC	Andrew Bogut	Utah	Dee Brown	Illinois	Joey Graham	Oklahoma State
NABC	Chris Paul	Wake Forest	Ike Diogu	Arizona State	Rashad McCants	North Carolina
NABC	J. J. Redick	Duke	Francisco Garcia	Louisville	Nate Robinson	Washington
NABC	Wayne Simien	Kansas	Luther Head	Illinois	Craig Smith	Boston College
NABC	Hakim Warrick	Syracuse	Deron Williams	Illinois	Salim Stoudamire	Arizona
Sporting News	Andrew Bogut	Utah	Ike Diogu	Arizona State	No third team	
Sporting News	Dee Brown	Illinois	Sean May	North Carolina	No third team	
Sporting News	Chris Paul	Wake Forest	Salim Stoudamire	Arizona	No third team	
Sporting News	J. J. Redick	Duke	Hakim Warrick	Syracuse	No third team	
Sporting News	Wayne Simien	Kansas	Deron Williams	Illinois	No third team	

AP Honorable Mention:

- Eddie Basden, Charlotte
- Brandon Bass, LSU
- Turner Battle, Buffalo
- Tim Begley, Penn
- Mike Bell, Florida Atlantic
- Josh Boone, Connecticut
- Seamus Boxley, Portland State
- Darren Brooks, Southern Illinois
- Pat Carroll, St. Joseph's
- Taylor Coppenrath, Vermont
- Travis Diener, Marquette
- David Doubley, Pacific
- Jared Dudley, Boston College
- Nick Fazekas, Nevada
- Channing Frye, Arizona
- Francisco García, Louisville
- Ryan Gomes, Providence
- Danny Granger, New Mexico
- Caleb Green, Oral Roberts
- Blake Hamilton, Monmouth
- Kevin Hamilton, Holy Cross
- Chuck Hayes, Kentucky
- Chakowby Hicks, Norfolk State
- Julius Hodge, NC State
- Jarrett Jack, Georgia Tech
- Willie Jenkins, Tennessee Tech
- Alex Loughton, Old Dominion
- John Lucas III, Oklahoma State
- Ed McCants, Wisconsin-Milwaukee
- Rashad McCants, North Carolina
- Juan Mendez, Niagara
- Adam Morrison, Gonzaga
- Yemi Nicholson, Denver
- Pele Paelay, Coastal Carolina
- Anthony Roberson, Florida
- Lawrence Roberts, Mississippi State
- Craig Smith, Boston College
- Steven Smith, La Salle
- Joe Thompson, Sam Houston State
- Obie Trotter, Alabama A&M
- Ronny Turiaf, Gonzaga
- Eric Williams, Wake Forest
- Kennedy Winston, Alabama
- Brendan Winters, Davidson

== Academic All-Americans ==
On March 2, 2005, CoSIDA and ESPN The Magazine announced the 2005 Academic All-America team, with Chris Hill headlining the University Division as the men's college basketball Academic All-American of the Year. The following is the 2004–05 ESPN The Magazine Academic All-America Men's Basketball Team (University Division) as selected by CoSIDA:

First Team
Player	School	Class	GPA and major
Eric Castro	Southern Methodist	Senior	3.80 Sociology/Accounting
Will Emerson	Mercer	Junior	4.00 Biology
Johannes Herber	West Virginia	Junior	4.00 Political Science
Chris Hill	Michigan State	Senior	3.75 Finance
Derek Winans	Southeast Missouri State	Senior	3.97 Business

Second Team
Player	School	Class	GPA and major
Turner Battle	Buffalo	Senior	3.56 Communications
Erik Benzel	Denver	Senior	3.69 Finance
Craig Forth	Syracuse	Senior	3.85 Inclusive Education and Geography
Dan Grunfeld	Stanford	Junior	3.66 American Studies
Neil Plank	Illinois State	Junior	4.00 Finance

Third Team
Player	School	Class	GPA and major
David Erbes	North Dakota State	Senior	3.88 Agricultural Economics
Christian Maråker	Pacific	Senior	3.46 Sports Sciences
Dan Oppland	Valparaiso	Junior	3.49 Physical Education/ Sports Management
Chris Paul	Wake Forest	Sophomore	3.21 Undecided
Dennis Trammell	Ball State	Senior	3.42 Business Management
