= James Augustine =

American basketball player (born 1984)

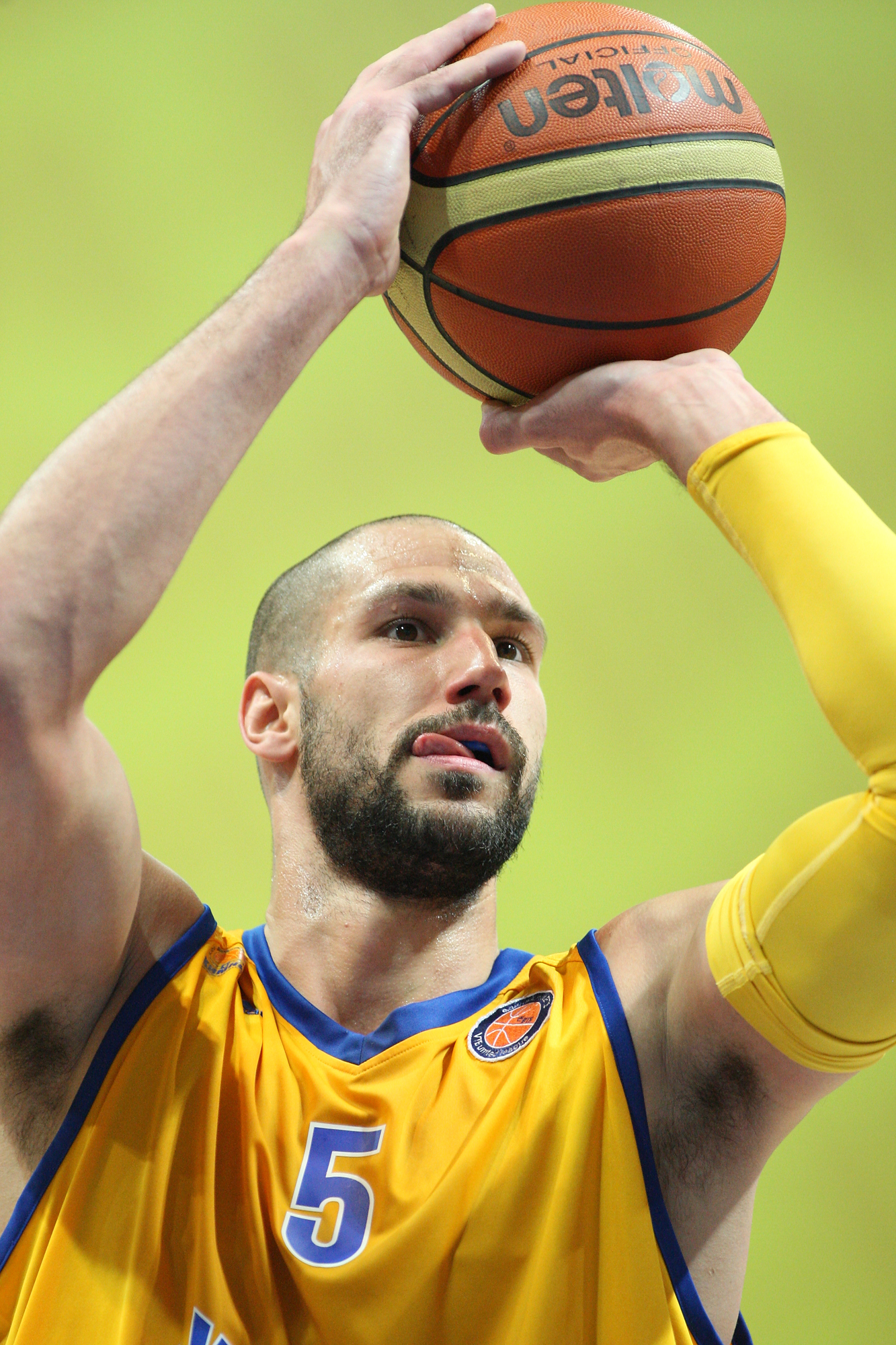
- Augustine playing with Khimki in 2012

Personal information
- Born: February 27, 1984 (age 42) Midlothian, Illinois, U.S.
- Listed height: 6 ft 10 in (2.08 m)
- Listed weight: 238 lb (108 kg)

Career information
- High school: Lincoln-Way Central (New Lenox, Illinois)
- College: Illinois (2002–2006)
- NBA draft: 2006: 2nd round, 41st overall pick
- Drafted by: Orlando Magic
- Playing career: 2006–2018
- Position: Power forward
- Number: 40, 5

Career history
- 2006–2008: Orlando Magic
- 2007: →Anaheim Arsenal
- 2008–2010: Gran Canaria
- 2010–2011: Power Electronics Valencia
- 2011–2012: UCAM Murcia
- 2012–2016: Khimki
- 2016–2017: CSKA Moscow
- 2017–2018: Unicaja

Career highlights
- EuroCup champion (2015); All-EuroCup Second Team (2010); VTB United League champion (2017); VTB United League Sixth Man of the Year (2014); All-VTB United League First Team (2014); Liga ACB rebounding leader (2012); EuroLeague Top Rebounder (2018)
- Stats at NBA.com
- Stats at Basketball Reference

James Augustine (born February 27, 1984) is an American former professional basketball player who played as a forward. During the career he played college basketball for the Illinois Fighting Illini before being drafted 41st overall in the 2006 NBA draft by the Orlando Magic. Later he relocated in Europe and concluded his playing career for Malaga. Augustine has played over 400 official games in different clubs.

== Early life ==
Augustine was born in Midlothian, Illinois, but eventually moved to Mokena, Illinois, where he attended Lincoln-Way Central High School in New Lenox, Illinois where he graduated in 2002. While at Lincoln-Way, Augustine played both football and basketball.

College recruiting
Name	Hometown	School	Height	Weight	Commit date
James Augustine; PF / C	Midlothian, IL	Lincoln-Way Central (Illinois)	6 ft 9 in (2.06 m)	215 lb (98 kg)	Aug 10, 2001
James Augustine; PF / C	Recruit ratings: Scout: Rivals:				
Overall recruit ranking: Scout: 14 (PF) Rivals: 11 (C)
Note: In many cases, Scout, Rivals, 247Sports, On3, and ESPN may conflict in their listings of height and weight.; In these cases, the average was taken. ESPN grades are on a 100-point scale.; Sources: "2002 Illinois Basketball Commitment List". Rivals.; "2002 Illinois Basketball Commitment List". Scout.; "Scout.com Team Recruiting Rankings". Scout.; "2002 Team Ranking". Rivals.

== College career ==
Augustine played for the University of Illinois men's basketball team from 2002 to 2006. As a freshman, Augustine was a starter for a team that finished second in the Big Ten. Playing both the power forward and center positions, his career with the Illini included many team records, a trip to the national championship game, and several awards including the Big Ten tournament Most Outstanding Player for his play in the 2005 Big Ten men's basketball tournament. Throughout his college career, Augustine was often complimented by announcers for his athleticism for a big man. Many attributed this ability to the fact that Augustine played Quarterback for his high school football team. Augustine is the first player in school history and just the 12th player in Big Ten history with 1,000 career points and 1,000 career rebounds. Augustine finished his college career with 1,383 points and 1,023 rebounds. He is also the school-record holder for career field goal percentage at 61.7 percent (534–865), which also ranks fifth in Big Ten history. Augustine Played in 137 games, starting 134 of them during his college career, the second most games played in school history (tied with Dee Brown).

== Professional career ==
Augustine was selected with the 41st pick by the Orlando Magic in the 2006 NBA draft. In August 2008, after playing two seasons in the NBA and its affiliate Development League, Augustine signed with Gran Canaria of the Spanish league.

On July 30, 2010, he signed a one-year contract with Power Electronics Valencia.

In August 2011 he signed with UCAM Murcia.

In May 2012, he signed a contract with the Russian team Khimki.

On July 4, 2016, Augustine signed with CSKA Moscow. On July 8, 2017, CSKA announced the termination of their contract with Augustine.

On August 3, 2017, Augustine signed with Spanish club Unicaja for the 2017–18 season. After season he was released from the club.

== Retirement ==
On 20 October 2019, at age 35, Augustine announced that he would retire from professional sport. “In summer I thought it was too much. Now I am enjoying life after active sport. I had a very long career," he said.

Augustine has expressed a desire to be a coach in the future.

== Career statistics ==
Legend
GP	Games played	GS	Games started	MPG	Minutes per game
FG%	Field-goal percentage	3P%	3-point field-goal percentage	FT%	Free-throw percentage
RPG	Rebounds per game	APG	Assists per game	SPG	Steals per game
BPG	Blocks per game	PPG	Points per game	PIR	Performance index rating
**Bold**	Career high

=== NBA ===
==== Regular season ====
Year	Team	GP	GS	MPG	FG%	3P%	FT%	RPG	APG	SPG	BPG	PPG
2006–07	Orlando	2	0	3.5	.333	.000	.000	**1.5**	**1.0**	.0	.0	1.0
2007–08	Orlando	**25**	0	**6.0**	**.529**	.000	**.500**	1.2	.1	**.2**	**.1**	**1.6**
Career		27	0	5.8	.514	.000	.500	1.2	.1	.2	.1	1.6

==== Playoffs ====
Year	Team	GP	GS	MPG	FG%	3P%	FT%	RPG	APG	SPG	BPG	PPG
2008	Orlando	1	0	2.0	1.000	.000	.000	1.0	.0	.0	.0	2.0
Career		1	0	2.0	1.000	.000	.000	1.0	.0	.0	.0	2.0

=== EuroLeague ===
*	Led the league

Year	Team	GP	GS	MPG	FG%	3P%	FT%	RPG	APG	SPG	BPG	PPG	PIR
2010–11	Valencia	8	2	14.7	.500	.000	.500	3.1	.5	.3	.1	3.4	4.3
2012–13	Khimki	22	**22**	22.7	.603	.333	**.698**	4.7	**1.7**	.6	.7	5.7	10.5
2015–16	Khimki	23	17	**27.5**	**.688**	**.375**	.600	**6.7**	**1.7**	**1.0**	**1.0**	**11.0**	**16.8**
2016–17	CSKA Moscow	**34**	6	16.2	.672	.333	.578	4.5	.4	.8	.4	6.0	8.5
2017–18	Málaga	29	15	23.3	.642	.333	.578	**6.7**	1.4	**1.0**	.5	9.2	14.4
Career		116	62	21.4	.645	.227	.607	5.4	1.2	.8	.6	7.6	11.7

=== Domestic leagues ===
Season	Team	League	GP	MPG	FG%	3P%	FT%	RPG	APG	SPG	BPG	PPG
2006–07	Anaheim Arsenal	D-League	8	27.4	.679	–	.818	8.9	.9	1.0	.8	10.1
2008–09	Gran Canaria	Liga ACB	35	24.1	.568	.200	.667	6.1	.9	.9	.8	7.7
2009–10	Gran Canaria	Liga ACB	36	24.7	.506	.167	.839	7.1	1.0	1.0	.4	8.6
2010–11	Power Electronics Valencia	Liga ACB	17	15.8	.448	.000	1.000	4.2	.5	.4	.2	4.2
2011–12	UCAM Murcia	Liga ACB	34	27.0	.614	.500	.711	8.3	1.2	1.1	.9	12.7
2012–13	Khimki	Russian PBL	12	19.8	.563	–	.765	5.0	1.5	1.0	.3	7.1
2012–13	Khimki	VTB United League	25	19.6	.614	.000	.571	5.1	1.3	.6	.6	6.6
2013–14	Khimki	VTB United League	19	24.8	.710	.500	.741	6.8	1.4	1.1	1.1	12.7
2014–15	Khimki	VTB United League	27	20.9	.605	.167	.742	5.7	1.4	.9	.7	9.0

== Records and awards ==
Augustine holds the school record for career rebounds with 1,023. He became the first Fighting Illini player and the 12th player in Big Ten Conference history to accumulate 1,000 points and 1,000 rebounds. This feat was last accomplished Indiana's by Alan Henderson, who played from 1992 to 1995. Augustine holds the school record for career field goal percentage at 61.7 and shares the school award for career victories with Dee Brown, with 114 wins.

Augustine was also named Most Outstanding Player in the 2005 Big Ten tournament.

Before playing in a regular-season game with the Magic, Augustine was assigned to an affiliate NBA Development League team, the Anaheim Arsenal, in January 2007, appearing in 8 games and averaging 10 points and eight rebounds. He recorded 4 double-doubles in his 8 games. Augustine made his first appearance in a regular-season game on February 2, 2007, against the New Jersey Nets, recording two points, two assists, and three rebounds in four minutes of playing time.

== Personal life ==
His uncle, Jerry Augustine, played professional baseball for the MLB's Milwaukee Brewers from 1975 to 1984 and was the head baseball coach at the University of Wisconsin–Milwaukee for the 1995–2006 seasons. Augustine is also the cousin of former NFL safety Nick Sorensen.
