= Luther Head =

American basketball player (born 1982)

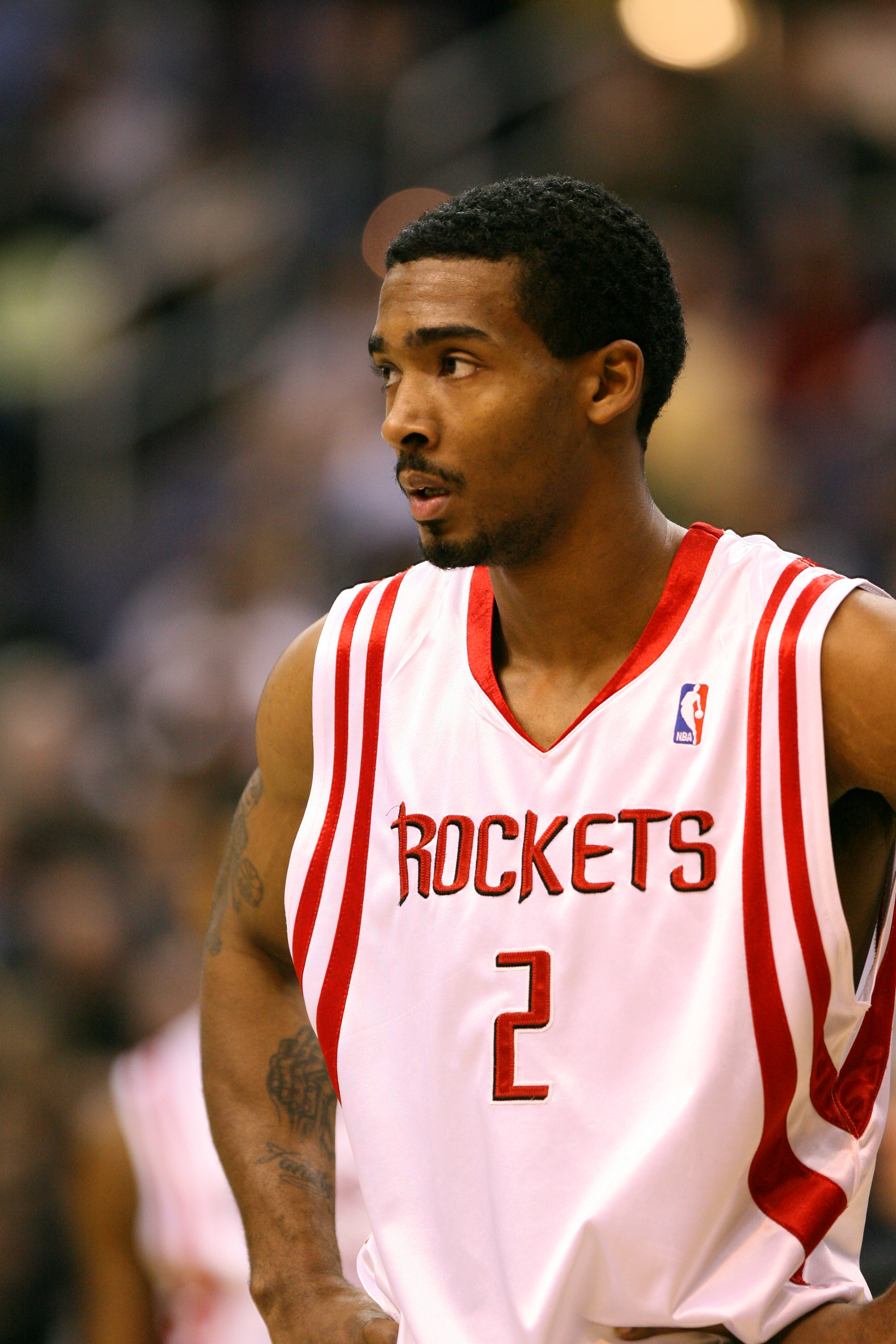
- Head with the Houston Rockets in 2006

Personal information
- Born: November 26, 1982 (age 43) Chicago, Illinois, U.S.
- Listed height: 6 ft 3 in (1.91 m)
- Listed weight: 190 lb (86 kg)

Career information
- High school: Manley Academy (Chicago, Illinois)
- College: Illinois (2001–2005)
- NBA draft: 2005: 1st round, 24th overall pick
- Drafted by: Houston Rockets
- Playing career: 2005–2015
- Position: Shooting guard / point guard
- Number: 2, 13, 9

Career history
- 2005–2009: Houston Rockets
- 2009: Miami Heat
- 2009–2010: Indiana Pacers
- 2010–2011: Sacramento Kings
- 2012–2013: Austin Toros
- 2013: Texas Legends
- 2013: CB Valladolid
- 2014: Pioneros de Los Mochis
- 2015: Caneros de la Romana

Career highlights
- NBA All-Rookie Second Team (2006); Consensus second-team All-American (2005); First-team All-Big Ten (2005)
- Stats at NBA.com
- Stats at Basketball Reference

Luther Dale Head (born November 26, 1982) is an American former professional basketball player.

== Early life ==
Head attended Chicago's Manley Academy where he averaged over 20 points, eight assists and seven rebounds per game as a junior. Those numbers earned him All-City honors and he was selected MVP of the Blue Division of the Chicago Public League. Led by Head and head coach Bo Delaney, Manley had a perfect 12–0 record and won the conference championship in the Blue-West Division. Manley finished 26–7 overall, losing to state runner-up Chicago Westinghouse in the Public League quarterfinals. During the season, Head posted 10 triple-doubles. In a game against Chicago Wells, Head broke the city record and recorded the second-highest number of assists in a game with 25, earning Prep Player of the Week honors from the Chicago Tribune. That game also earned him Gatorade Prep Player of the Week honors. During the IHSA State Playoffs, Head scored 26 points and contributed 15 assists against Marshall in a first-round playoff victory. He would then post a triple-double in a second-round win over Steinmetz. During the summer, Head attended the Adidas ABCD Camp in New Jersey.

As a senior, Head averaged 22 points, eight rebounds, six assists and five steals in the rugged Red-West Division of the Chicago Public League. He would earn First-Team All-State honors in 2001 from the Chicago Tribune, Chicago Sun-Times, Champaign-Urbana News-Gazette, Associated Press and Illinois Basketball Coaches Association. Head was also selected to play in the Wendy's All-Star Classic as a senior. He played primarily point guard in high school but occasionally played shooting guard to complement his abilities. Head also finished sixth in the voting for Mr. Basketball in the state of Illinois following his senior year. However, to many college scouts, Head's senior year was seen as a disappointment as a few of his statistics dropped since junior year. Nevertheless, he would sign his letter of intent to play college basketball for the University of Illinois where he became the first Illinois recruit from the Chicago Public League since 1994.

== College career ==
=== Freshman year ===
As a freshman at the University of Illinois, Head saw limited playing time. Coach Bill Self had a veteran team which included Brian Cook and Frankie Williams, so he had little need to play a freshman. His playing time increased as the season progressed and he started 13 games, including 11 of the last 12. Head averaged 4.5 points in 16.6 minutes per game for the season while shooting 51 percent from the field (63-of-124). His first season showed Head's individual talent for shooting and defense as he was second on the team with 34 steals. He showed his potential to become an eventual offensive force when he scored a season-high 19 points in an NCAA Tournament first-round win over San Diego State, hitting 8-of-11 shots, including three three-pointers. In that same game, he tallied four assists and three steals against the Aztecs. His season-high for assists was six against Kansas in the regional semifinal game which proved that he could perform on the national stage against even the best teams in the nation.

=== Sophomore year ===
A pelvic injury slowed Head during the season and caused him to miss seven games, but he still started eight games and played more than 20 minutes per contest. The arrival of two freshmen point guards, Dee Brown and Deron Williams, prevented Head from becoming a consistent starter and pushed him to the shooting guard and small forward positions. He improved as his injury healed and shot 58.5 percent (24-of-41) from the floor in his last 10 games while hitting 48 percent (12-of-25) of his shots from behind the three-point line in his last 11 games. Head improved to become the fourth leading scorer on the team averaging 7.9 points per game. His shooting also improved as he shot 42.4 percent from three-point range (28-of-66) and 51.9 percent overall (68-of-131). He proved that he could be a capable scorer if given consistent minutes as he scored in double figures nine times, including five times during Big Ten play. He scored a season-high 16 points in the Big Ten Tournament semifinal win over Indiana. In that game, Head hit 5-of-6 shots including two three-pointers against the Hoosiers. Head averaged 9.7 points in Illinois' three Big Ten Tournament victories while hitting a remarkable 69.2 percent of his shots. In those three games he scored 15 points against Purdue, hitting 5-of-9 shots and three 3-pointers, his three 3-pointers at Michigan State, and had 11 points along with a season-high seven rebounds against Ohio State. In a game against Eastern Illinois, Head posted a season-high five assists. Head also hit all five of his shots in a game against Western Illinois, scoring 11 points.

=== Junior year ===
The junior year was marked by many changes. Head coach Bill Self left Illinois to take the vacant job at Kansas and Southern Illinois head coach Bruce Weber took over as coach of the Illini. Weber made Head a full-time starter which resulted in a significant increase in playing time. Head ranked fourth on the team (24th in the Big Ten) in scoring with 11.0 points per game. He scored at least nine points in 20 of 29 games, including double figures in 14 games. He erupted for a career-high 29 points on 9-of-14 shooting with four 3-pointers in a Big Ten Tournament quarterfinal victory over Indiana. He then scored 19 points and handed out eight assists in Big Ten-clinching win at Purdue. That game saw Head make a dramatic game-winning play when he threw a half-court pass to Roger Powell and followed Powell's blocked shot by putting in a rebound basket with nine-tenths of a second remaining. Head then recorded his first double-double with 16 points and a then career-high 10 rebounds in win at Iowa. Head showed the ability to rebound as he led the Illini in rebounding with eight in win over Northwestern. He led all scorers with 18 points in a win over Michigan hitting five-of-eight 3-pointers. Head again led all scorers with 17 points, making five 3-pointers, in win over Michigan State. In the NCAA tournament, Head averaged 7.0 assists and 5.5 rebounds in Illinois' two victories. He would finish third on the team in assists on the season (75). To prove how valuable Head was to the team, the Illini were 21–3 with him in the starting line-up.

=== Senior year ===
Head's senior year would be his finest. He was selected as a Consensus Second-Team All-American, Associated Press Second-Team All-American, USBWA Second-Team All-American, NABC Second-Team All-American, College Insider.com All-American, Sports Illustrated.com Honorable Mention All-American, First-Team All-Big Ten selection by both the league coaches and the media, Big Ten All-Tournament Team selection, NCAA Chicago Regional All-Tournament Team honoree, NCAA Final Four All-Tournament Team, Wooden Award finalist, Oscar Robertson (USBWA) Player of the Year finalist, Adolph Rupp Award finalist, Midseason Naismith Award candidate, USBWA All-District, NABC First-Team All-District.

Head started every game of the season, leading the Illini in scoring, averaging 15.9 points (5th in Big Ten). Playing alongside point guards Dee Brown and Deron Williams—both excellent passers—Head scored a total of 622 points on the year, tying the fifth-highest single-season total in school history. He was Illinois' leading scorer in 16 games and scored in double figures in 36 of 39 games, with 12 games of 20+ points. Head led the Big Ten with 116 three-pointers (3.0 per game) and set an Illinois single-season record for three-point field goals in a season (breaking previous record of 96 by Cory Bradford in 2000). His 116 three-pointers rank as the third-highest single-season total in Big Ten history. He made at least three treys in 23 games. He was also second on the Illini, fifth in Big Ten and 33rd in the NCAA with a three-point field goal percentage of 41.0 percent (116–283). Head also shot 46.3 percent from the field on the season (214–462). He led the Illini in free throw percentage (6th in Big Ten) at 78.8 percent (78–99). His defense improved again as he was second on the Illini and fifth in the Big Ten in steals, averaging 1.7 spg. Head was third on the Illini and fifth in the Big Ten in assists, averaging 3.8 apg.

Head finished third on the Illini and fifth in the Big Ten in assist/turnover ratio (2.17), third on the Illini in rebounding, averaging 4.0 rpg. He was awarded Big Ten Co-Player of the Week on January 17, 2005, after wins over Penn State and at Northwestern. In the Las Vegas Holiday Classic Tournament, he led an undefeated Illinois team and earned MVP honors. His season-high for points occurred twice when he scored 26 points at Northwestern and at Wisconsin. He set a career high with six 3-pointers against Oakland and equaled that mark with six threes against Louisville in the Final Four. In a game against Iowa, Head had a career-high six steals, the most by an Illini player on the season. He tied his career high in assists with nine in three different games against Oakland, Gonzaga, and Valparaiso.

The Illini tied an NCAA Division I record by winning 37 games during the season. The team was ranked number one for most of the season. In the NCAA tournament, Head set Illinois' school-record for career games played in the tournament (14), career points scored (162), career field goals (59) and career 3-point field goals (32). The team reached the championship game for the first time in school history but lost to North Carolina. Head missed a potential game-tying three-pointer in the final seconds of the game which resulted in Illinois ending the year as the number two ranked team in the nation. He finished his Illinois career ranked 19th on the Illini all-time scoring list with 1,295 career points, fourth on the Illini career three-point field goals list with 209 treys, and ninth on the Illini career steals list with 158 steals. He scored his 1,000th point at Wisconsin on January 25, 2005.

Head finished his course work in the major of sport management in May 2005 and will need only an internship to earn his bachelor's degree.

== NBA career ==
=== Houston Rockets (2005–2009) ===
In the 2005–06 NBA season, Head played in 80 games, starting 27. He finished the season averaging 8.8 points and 2.7 assists per game. After the season, Head was named to the NBA All-Rookie Second Team.

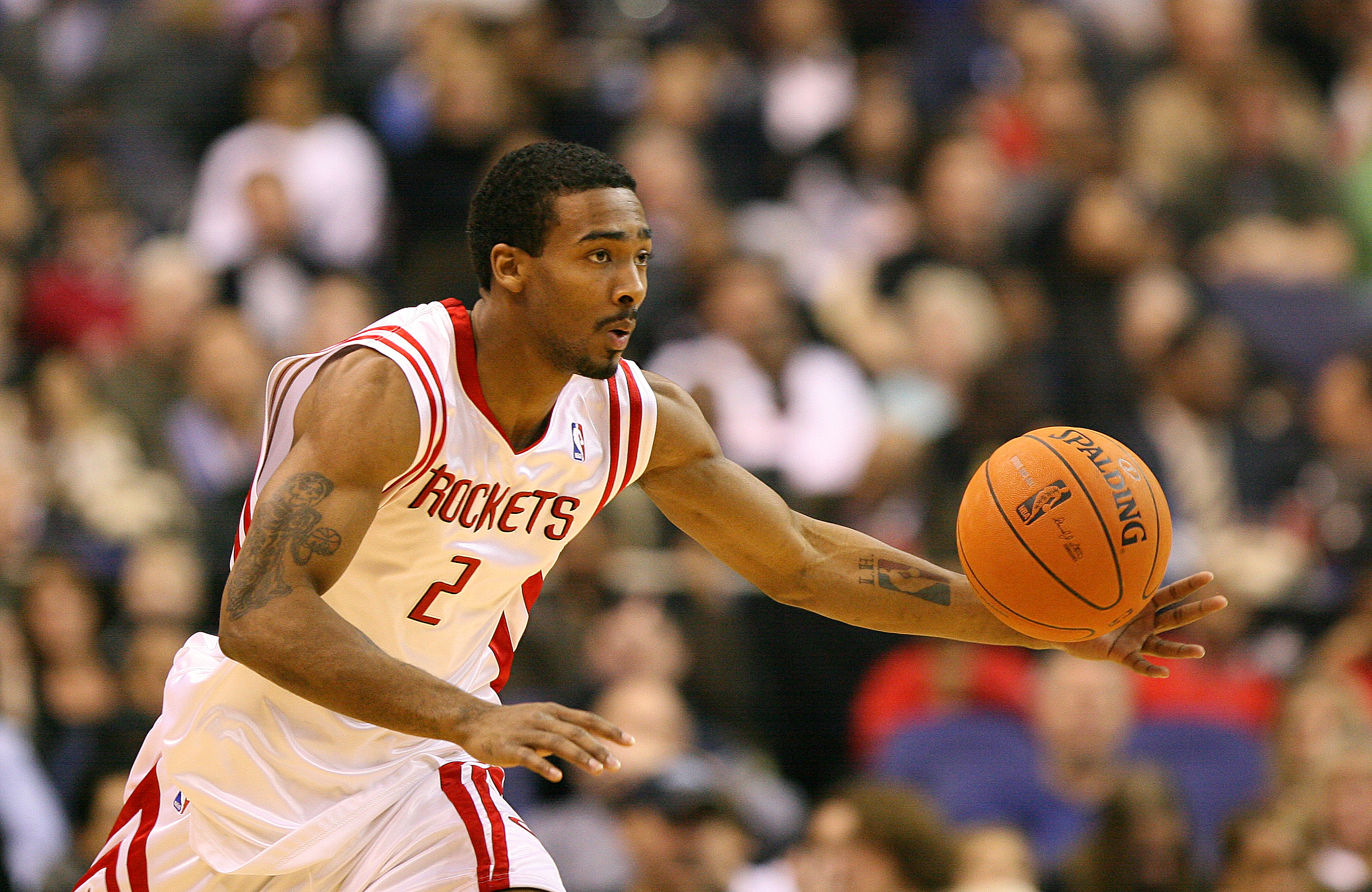
Head playing for the Rockets in 2006

In the 2006–07 NBA season, he averaged 10.8 points, 3.2 rebounds, and 2.4 assists as of April 15, 2007, and proved his worth as a valuable reserve player for the Houston Rockets, especially in light of the absences of Tracy McGrady and Yao Ming due to injuries. He had a streak of hitting at least one three-pointer in 37 straight games that season, and established himself as a reliable clutch shooter, making several game-clinching shots late in games. On April 4, 2007, with McGrady and Yao absent, Head had a career night, scoring 30 in a loss to the Golden State Warriors. Head was 10–13 from the floor, 7–9 from the 3-point line, and 3–3 from the free throw line.

On February 19, 2009, Head was reunited with his Illini teammate Brian Cook, after he was acquired from the Orlando Magic, but the reunion was short lived, as on February 28 the Rockets waived Head.

=== Miami Heat (2009) ===
On March 3, Head was signed by the Miami Heat. Shortly after his first stint with Miami, Luther Head suffered a broken hand against the Orlando Magic, thus ending his season.

=== Indiana Pacers (2009–2010) ===
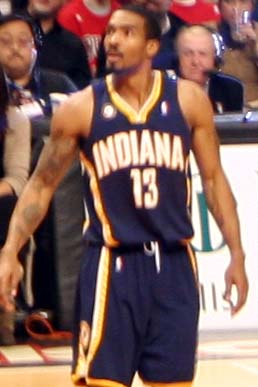
Head with the Indiana Pacers in 2009

On September 17, 2009, Head signed a contract with the Indiana Pacers.

=== Sacramento Kings (2010–2011) ===
On September 5, 2010, Head signed a non-guaranteed contract with the Sacramento Kings. Head came off the bench scoring 14 points in his first game as a King on October 27, 2010, helping the Kings beat the Timberwolves 117–116 in their opener. On the 19th of March, 2011, Head was waived by the Kings.

== China and NBA D-League ==
During the 2011 NBA lockout, Head signed with the Jiangsu Nangang Dragons in China. However, before arriving in China, he sustained an injury, and Jiangsu gave up on his deal.

On November 1, 2012, Head joined the Austin Toros of the NBA D-League. On January 22, 2013, the Toros traded him to the Texas Legends. Head was waived by the Legends on February 12, 2013.

== Europe ==
In September 2013, Spanish League squad CB Valladolid announced Head as one of their first four signings for the 2013–14 season.

== NBA career statistics ==
Legend
GP	Games played	GS	Games started	MPG	Minutes per game
FG%	Field goal percentage	3P%	3-point field goal percentage	FT%	Free throw percentage
RPG	Rebounds per game	APG	Assists per game	SPG	Steals per game
BPG	Blocks per game	PPG	Points per game	**Bold**	Career high

=== Regular season ===
Year	Team	GP	GS	MPG	FG%	3P%	FT%	RPG	APG	SPG	BPG	PPG
2005–06	Houston	**80**	**27**	**28.9**	.403	.361	.699	**3.3**	**2.7**	**1.1**	.1	8.8
2006–07	Houston	**80**	10	27.6	**.437**	**.441**	.790	3.2	2.4	1.0	.1	**10.9**
2007–08	Houston	73	17	18.9	.432	.351	.815	1.8	1.9	.6	.1	7.6
2008–09	Houston	22	4	14.6	.386	.368	**.875**	1.2	1.6	.3	.0	4.8
2008–09	Miami	10	0	17.6	.372	.375	.625	2.5	2.3	**1.1**	.1	4.3
2009–10	Indiana	47	10	17.3	**.437**	.352	.828	1.7	1.5	.4	.2	7.6
2010–11	Sacramento	36	14	16.3	.415	.391	.780	1.7	1.9	.3	**.3**	5.6
**Career**		348	82	22.4	.423	.388	..773	2.4	2.1	.7	.1	8.2

=== Playoffs ===
Year	Team	GP	GS	MPG	FG%	3P%	FT%	RPG	APG	SPG	BPG	PPG
2007	Houston	**7**	0	**20.1**	**.306**	**.261**	.500	**2.7**	**1.1**	**.4**	**.3**	**4.6**
2008	Houston	5	0	8.8	.071	.000	**1.000**	.4	.8	**.4**	.2	.8
**Career**		12	0	22.4	.240	.207	..600	1.8	1.0	.4	.3	3.0
