= Sean May =

American basketball player and coach (born 1984)

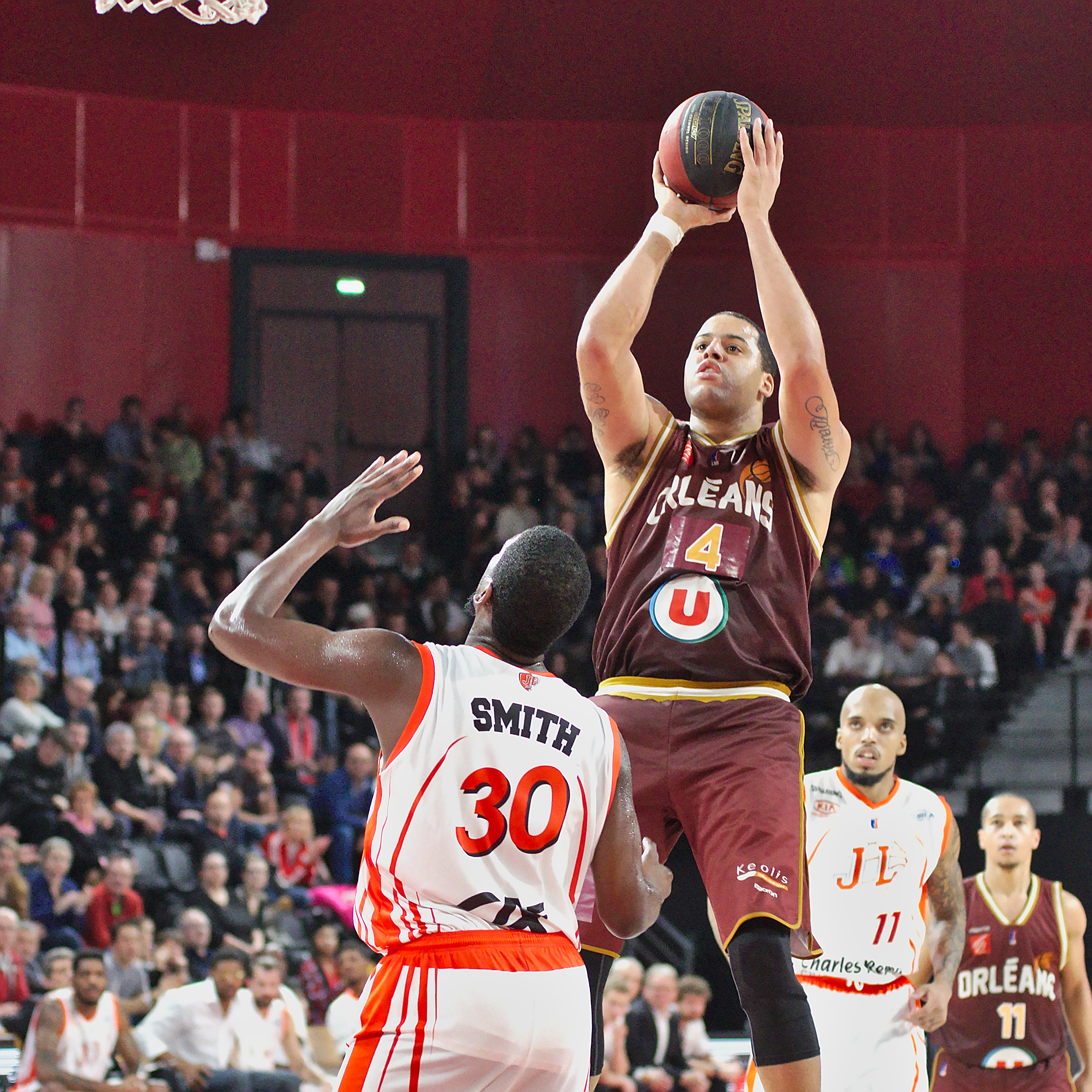
- May in action for Orléans Loiret in 2015

North Carolina Tar Heels
- Title: Assistant coach
- League: Atlantic Coast Conference

Personal information
- Born: April 4, 1984 (age 42) Chicago, Illinois, U.S.
- Listed height: 6 ft 9 in (2.06 m)
- Listed weight: 266 lb (121 kg)

Career information
- High school: Bloomington North (Bloomington, Indiana)
- College: North Carolina (2002–2005)
- NBA draft: 2005: 1st round, 13th overall pick
- Drafted by: Charlotte Bobcats
- Playing career: 2005–2015
- Position: Power forward
- Number: 42
- Coaching career: 2015–present

Career history

Playing
- 2005–2009: Charlotte Bobcats
- 2009–2010: Sacramento Kings
- 2010–2011: Fenerbahçe Ülker
- 2011–2012: Zagreb
- 2012: Sutor Montegranaro
- 2012–2013: Paris-Levallois
- 2014: SPO Rouen
- 2014–2015: Orléans Loiret

Career highlights
- French League Best Scorer (2013); French Cup Final MVP (2013); French Cup winner (2013); Turkish League champion (2011); Turkish Cup winner (2011); NCAA champion (2005); NCAA Final Four Most Outstanding Player (2005); Consensus second-team All-American (2005); First-team All-ACC (2005); Second-team All-ACC (2004); USA Basketball Male Athlete of the Year (2004); No. 42 honored by North Carolina Tar Heels; First-team Parade All-American (2002); Indiana Mr. Basketball (2002); McDonald's All-American (2002)
- Stats at NBA.com
- Stats at Basketball Reference
Medals
Men's basketball
Representing United States
FIBA Americas U20 Championship
Gold medal – first place	2004 Halifax	National team

Sean Gregory May (born April 4, 1984) is an American former professional basketball player and current assistant basketball coach at the University of North Carolina. May was born in Chicago, Illinois, and grew up in Bloomington, Indiana. He was a three-time all-state selection at Bloomington High School North, and was at one time a teammate of former NBA player Jared Jeffries. May was named to the 2002 McDonald's High School All-American team, along with Raymond Felton and Rashad McCants, who would later team with May to win an NCAA Championship as part of the 2004–05 North Carolina Tar Heels.

== College career ==
When the highly recruited May chose to attend the University of North Carolina at Chapel Hill, it was a major surprise to most basketball recruiting observers; it had been thought that he would stay in his hometown and play for the Indiana University Hoosiers. He had strong family connections to IU; his father Scott was a forward on the school's undefeated 1975–76 NCAA championship team and won the Naismith Award the same year, and his brother Scott Jr. played for the Indiana basketball team that made the NCAA title game in 2002.

At North Carolina, May made his mark as the starting center for the Tar Heels basketball team from 2003 to 2005. As a junior, he was named Most Outstanding Player of the 2005 NCAA tournament after leading North Carolina to its fourth national championship. The Tar Heels defeated the University of Illinois by a score of 75–70 to win the title, with May scoring 26 points on 10–11 shooting and grabbing 10 rebounds. May and his father are one of four father-son duos to each win an NCAA basketball championship. (Note: The others are Marques and Kris Johnson, Henry and Mike Bibby, and Derek and Nolan Smith.) May graduated from the University of North Carolina in August 2009 with a B.A. in African-American studies.

== Professional career ==
=== Charlotte Bobcats (2005–2009) ===
In April 2005, May declared that he would forgo his senior year at UNC to enter the NBA draft. He was selected 13th overall by the Charlotte Bobcats, becoming one of a record four Tar Heels to be lottery picks in the 2005 NBA draft. He started his professional career strongly by being named MVP of the Rocky Mountain Revue summer league. An injury in December, however, cut his rookie season short.

On October 5, 2007, May announced that he had decided to have micro fracture surgery on his right knee, consequently missing the entire 2007–08 NBA season. The effects of the surgery affected him the following season (2008–09), as he experienced conditioning problems, tiredness and tendinitis.

On December 30, 2008, May was deemed physically unfit to play, making Bobcats coach Larry Brown place him on the inactive list for the foreseeable future.

On June 23, 2009, ESPN News reported that the Charlotte Bobcats declined to make a qualifying offer for the fourth year of his rookie contract, making him an unrestricted free agent.

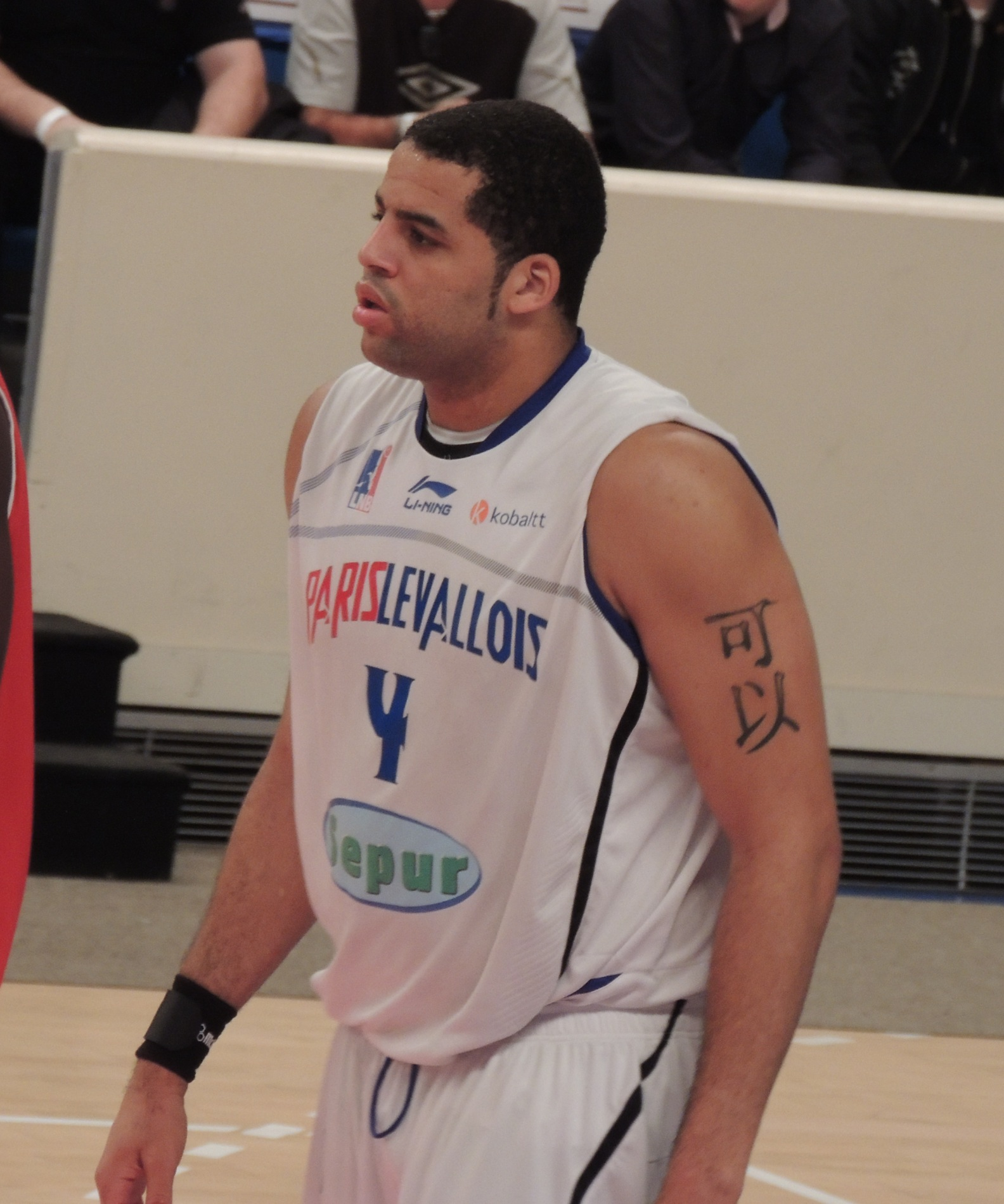
May with Paris-Levallois

=== Sacramento Kings (2009–2010) ===
On July 21, 2009, May signed a one-year contract for $884,881 with the Sacramento Kings contingent upon him passing his physical.

On August 9, 2010, he signed a one-year contract with the New Jersey Nets. However, he suffered a stress fracture to his left foot in preseason training and was released on September 7.

=== International (2010–2014) ===
On November 22, 2010, May signed with Fenerbahçe Ülker of Turkey for the 2010–11 season.

On October 1, 2011, he signed with KK Zagreb of Croatia. In February 2012, he left Zagreb and moved to Italy to sign with Sutor Basket Montegranaro. In April 2012, he got injured and missed the rest of the season.

On July 18, 2012, May signed a two-year deal with Paris-Levallois Basket of France. This reunited May with his former college teammate Jawad Williams. In the 2013–14 season, he played only one game because of injury.

On November 24, 2014, May signed with SPO Rouen Basket. On December 30, 2014, he left Rouen and signed with Orléans Loiret Basket for the rest of the season.

== Career statistics ==
Legend
GP	Games played	GS	Games started	MPG	Minutes per game
FG%	Field goal percentage	3P%	3-point field goal percentage	FT%	Free throw percentage
RPG	Rebounds per game	APG	Assists per game	SPG	Steals per game
BPG	Blocks per game	PPG	Points per game	**Bold**	Career high

=== NBA ===
Year	Team	GP	GS	MPG	FG%	3P%	FT%	RPG	APG	SPG	BPG	PPG
2005–06	Charlotte	23	1	17.3	.409	.000	.766	4.7	1.0	**.7**	.5	8.2
2006–07	Charlotte	35	8	**23.9**	**.500**	.667	**.768**	**6.7**	**1.9**	.5	**.7**	**11.9**
2008–09	Charlotte	24	**12**	12.5	.398	**1.000**	.700	2.9	.4	.2	.2	3.9
2009–10	Sacramento	**37**	4	8.9	.459	.000	.656	1.9	.5	.3	.2	3.3
**Career**		119	25	15.7	.458	.231	.746	4.0	1.0	.4	.4	6.9

=== EuroLeague ===
Year	Team	GP	GS	MPG	FG%	3P%	FT%	RPG	APG	SPG	BPG	PPG	PIR
2010–11	Fenerbahçe Ülker	8	0	12.2	.406	.000	**.727**	2.8	.5	.5	**.3**	4.3	4.1
2011–12	Zagreb	**9**	**8**	**29.2**	**.455**	**.333**	.692	**6.4**	**1.1**	**.6**	**.3**	**11.7**	**11.3**
**Career**		17	8	21.2	.442	.292	.703	4.7	.8	.5	.3	8.1	7.9

=== College ===
Year	Team	GP	GS	MPG	FG%	3P%	FT%	RPG	APG	SPG	BPG	PPG
2002–03	North Carolina	11	10	28.0	.472	.000	.575	8.1	1.0	1.5	1.8	11.4
2003–04	North Carolina	29	29	28.9	.463	.000	.689	9.8	1.4	1.4	1.2	15.2
2004–05	North Carolina	37	36	26.8	.567	.000	.758	10.7	1.7	1.2	1.0	17.5
Career		77	75	27.8	.513	.000	.717	10.0	1.5	1.3	1.2	15.8

== Coaching career ==
In fall of 2015, May was hired as the director of player development at his alma mater, the University of North Carolina. He served in the position for two years, and thereafter transitioned to the role of Director of Basketball Operations in fall of 2017.

In April 2021, head coach Roy Williams retired and was replaced by Hubert Davis. On April 15, May received a promotion from the Director of Basketball Operations position, moving into one of the three on-the-bench assistant spots for Davis' inaugural UNC staff.

== Notes ==
Awards and achievements
Preceded by Chris Thomas	Indiana Mr. Basketball award 2002	Succeeded by Justin Cage
