= Scott Garson =

American basketball coach (born 1976)

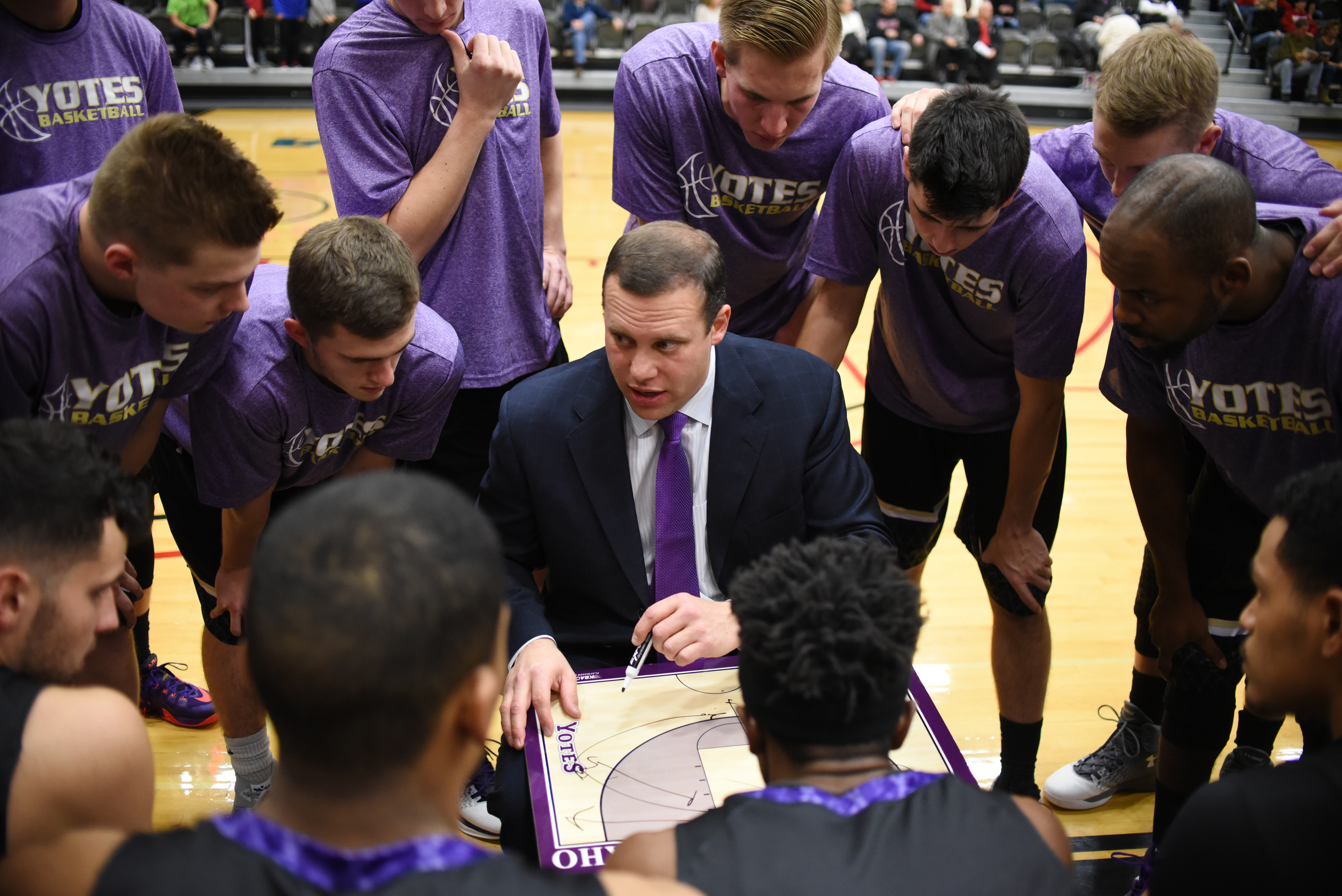
- Garson as College of Idaho head coach in 2016.

Current position
- Title: Associate head coach
- Team: UNLV
- Conference: Mountain West Conference

Biographical details
- Born: April 24, 1976 (age 50); Tarzana, California, U.S.
- Education: UC Santa Barbara; Utah

Playing career

Basketball
- 1994–1995: Washington University

Baseball
- 1995: Washington University
- Positions: Guard, pitcher

Coaching career (HC unless noted)
- 1996–1998: Santa Barbara HS (JV/asst. varsity)
- 1999–2002: Utah (GA)
- 2002–2003: Utah (VC)
- 2003–2004: Utah (assistant)
- 2006–2013: UCLA (assistant)
- 2013–2018: College of Idaho
- 2018–2025: Santa Clara (assistant)
- 2025–present: UNLV (assoc. HC)

Administrative career (AD unless noted)
- 1998–1999: Pepperdine (admin. asst.)

Head coaching record
- Overall: 129–42
- Tournaments: 6–4 (NAIA D-II)

Accomplishments and honors

Championships
- As head coach: 3× Cascade Collegiate Conference Regular Season (2014, 2015, 2018); 3× Cascade Collegiate Conference Tournament (2014, 2015, 2018); As assistant coach: 3× Pac-10/Pac-12 Regular Season (2007, 2008, 2013); Pac-10 tournament (2008)

Awards
- As head coach: Red Auerbach National Coach of the Year Award (2015); 2× Cascade Collegiate Conference Coach of the Year (2014, 2018); NAIA DII Final Four (2018); As assistant coach: 2× NCAA Final Four (2007, 2008)

Scott Jon Garson (born April 24, 1976) is an American basketball coach who is currently the associate head coach for the UNLV Runnin' Rebels.

Prior to that, Garson was an assistant men's basketball coach at Santa Clara University, UCLA and the University of Utah. From 2013 to 2018, Garson was head coach at the College of Idaho.

== Early life and education ==
Born in Tarzana, California, Garson grew up in a Jewish family in Calabasas and graduated from Harvard-Westlake School in 1994. After high school, Garson initially attended Washington University in St. Louis and played at guard in basketball and pitcher in baseball in 1994–95. In 1995, Garson transferred to the University of California, Santa Barbara (UCSB). He graduated from UCSB in 1999 with a B.A. in law and society.

While a student at UCSB, Garson was a production assistant for The Jim Rome Show in the summer of 1996 and worked for the United States Department of Justice Office of Public Affairs in the summer of 1997. From 1996 to 1998, Garson was a varsity basketball assistant coach and junior varsity head coach at Santa Barbara High School.

In 2003, Garson completed a M.S. in exercise and sports science with an emphasis in sport psychology from the University of Utah.

== Coaching career ==
=== College ===
In April 2025, Garson was hired by Josh Pastner to be the associate head coach at the University of Nevada, Las Vegas.

In April 2018 Garson was hired to be an assistant at Santa Clara after having spent his previous five seasons as head coach at the College of Idaho, where he led the Yotes to a 129–42 record, three Cascade Collegiate Conference regular season championships, three league tournament titles and four NAIA national tournament appearances, including a run to the 2015 national quarterfinals and 2018 semifinals.

Prior to his time at the College of Idaho, Garson was on Ben Howland’s staff at UCLA for nine seasons, worked under Rick Majerus at Utah for 5 years and spent 1 season at Pepperdine University under Lorenzo Romar. During his 21 seasons in college basketball at 5 different schools, Coach Garson has been a part of 20 winning seasons, 17 postseason berths and 10 conference championships.

Garson led the Yotes to both the CCC regular-season and tournament titles in 2014, 2015 and 2018. He became the first coach at the school to win back-to-back league crowns since the 1950s. His 2014–15 team posted a 30–6 record, which was then the second-most single-season victories in the school’s 105-year men’s basketball program history. The 2017–18 squad matched that total when they finished 30–7.

Garson was the recipient of the 2015 Red Auerbach National Coach of the Year Award, and was named the 2014 and 2018 CCC Coach of the Year. He coached six NAIA All-Americans, two CCC Players of the Year and three CCC Defensive Players of the Year. In all, 17 players under Garson earned All-CCC honors and 13 secured Academic All-CCC selections.

His College of Idaho teams enjoyed home cooking, posting a 76–10 mark at J.A. Albertson Activities Center. During his tenure, home attendance nearly doubled, with the Yotes leading the NAIA in home attendance during the 2014–15 campaign and finishing second during 2015–16 and 2016–17.

During Garson’s tenure at UCLA, the Bruins amassed a record of 222–90, including four Pac-10/Pac-12 Conference regular season titles (2006, 2007, 2008, 2013), and two Pac-10 tournament titles (2006, 2008). The Bruins qualified for six NCAA Tournaments and made trips to the Final Four in 2006, 2007 and 2008 – reaching the 2006 national championship game.

Garson was responsible for the development of the UCLA perimeter players – including current NBA players, Russell Westbrook, Arron Afflalo, Darren Collison, Jrue Holiday, Luc Richard Mbah a Moute, Shabazz Muhammad, Kyle Anderson, and Norman Powell. Garson also was responsible for the recruitment of Zach LaVine, the 13th overall pick in the 2014 NBA Draft and 2-time NBA Slam Dunk Contest champion. Garson was instrumental in the recruiting efforts for the Bruins, who claimed ESPN’s No. 1 class in both 2008 and 2012. A total of 16 players recruited or coached by Garson have been selected in the NBA draft.

Garson spent five seasons at the University of Utah under hall-of-fame coach and mentor, Rick Majerus. Garson served as a graduate assistant, video coordinator and, in his final year, assistant coach for Majerus. The Utes won three Mountain West Conference titles and advanced to the NCAA Tournament four times during Garson’s time there, while amassing a record of 112–47.

=== International ===
In the European Maccabi Games 2015, Garson was an assistant coach for the under-18 US men's basketball team.

== Head coaching record ==
Record table
Season	Team	Overall	Conference	Standing	Postseason
College of Idaho Yotes (Cascade Collegiate Conference) (2013–2018)
2013–14	College of Idaho	28–6	16–2	1st	NAIA D-II first round
2014–15	College of Idaho	30–6	14–4	T–1st	NAIA D-II Quarterfinals
2015–16	College of Idaho	17–13	12–8	4th	
2016–17	College of Idaho	24–10	15–5	2nd	NAIA D-II Sweet 16
2017–18	College of Idaho	30–7	18–2	1st	NAIA D-II Fab Four
College of Idaho:		129–42	75–21		
Total:		129–42			
National champion Postseason invitational champion Conference regular season champion Conference regular season and conference tournament champion Division regular season champion Division regular season and conference tournament champion Conference tournament champion
