= Pac-12 Conference men's basketball tournament =

American collegiate basketball postseason

- Logo of the tournament
- Sport: Basketball
- Conference: Pac-12 Conference
- Number of teams: 10 (1987–1990, 2002–2011); 12 (2012–2024); 9 (2027–present)
- Format: Single-elimination tournament
- Current stadium: MGM Grand Garden Arena
- Current location: Paradise, Nevada
- Played: 1987–1990, 2002–2024, 2027–present
- Last contest: 2024
- Current champion: Oregon Ducks
- Most championships: Arizona Wildcats (9)
- TV partner(s): Pac-12 Networks, Fox Sports and ESPN (2013-2024); USA Sports (starting in 2027; all games) and CBS Sports (starting in 2027; championship game only)
- Official website: Pac-12.com Men's Basketball

Sponsors
- New York Life

Host stadiums
- Pauley Pavilion 1987; McKale Center 1988; The Forum 1989; University Activity Center 1990; Staples Center 2002–2012; MGM Grand Garden Arena 2013–2016, 2027– T-Mobile Arena 2017–2024

Host locations
- Los Angeles, California 1987, 2002–2012; Tucson, Arizona 1988; Inglewood, California 1989; Tempe, Arizona 1990; Paradise, Nevada 2013–2024, 2027–present

The Pac-12 Conference men's basketball tournament, otherwise known as the Pac-12 tournament, is the annual concluding tournament for the NCAA college basketball in the Pac-12, taking place on the Las Vegas Strip at MGM Grand Garden Arena. The first tournament was held in 1987 for the Pac-10 conference. It ended after four seasons. The conference did not have a conference tournament until it was started again in 2002.

For a time, the future of the Pac-12 Conference itself as with the tournament after the 2024 tournament was uncertain, since the conference only had two remaining members at the start of the 2024–25 academic year. Both the remaining Pac-12 schools joined the West Coast Conference as non-football affiliated members for all sports with the exception of baseball for at least the 2024–25 academic year and beyond. In a span of less than three weeks in September and October 2024, the Pac-12 added six new members effective in 2026–27—Boise State, Colorado State, Fresno State, Gonzaga, San Diego State, and Utah State. Texas State was later added, also effective in 2026–27. With nine confirmed members, the conference tournament will resume in Las Vegas in 2027.

== History ==
The predecessor conference of the Pac-12, the Pacific Coast Conference, began playing basketball in the 1915–16 season. The PCC was split into North and South Divisions for basketball beginning with the 1922–23 season. The winners of the two divisions would play a best of three series of games to determine the PCC basketball champion. If two division teams tied, they would have a one-game playoff to produce the division representative. Starting with the first edition of the event now known as the NCAA Division I men's basketball tournament in 1939, the winner of the PCC divisional playoff was given the automatic berth in the NCAA tournament. Oregon, the 1939 PCC champion, won the championship game in the 1939 NCAA basketball tournament.

The last divisional playoff was in the 1954–55 season. After that, there was no divisional play and all teams played each other in a round robin competition. From the 1955–56 season through the 1985–86 season, the regular season conference champion was awarded the NCAA tournament berth from the PCC, later AAWU, Pac-8 and Pac-10.

Beginning with the 1975 NCAA tournament, the league (known as the Pac-8 until becoming the Pac-10 with the 1978 arrival of Arizona and Arizona State) would usually place at least one other at-large team in the tournament. Following the end of UCLA's dominance in the 1970s, the Pac-10 would struggle to get out of the early rounds of the NCAA tournament.

By the 1985–86 season, the Pac-10 was one of three remaining conferences that gave their automatic NCAA tournament bid to the regular season round-robin champion. The other two conferences were the Ivy League and the Big Ten Conference.

=== 1987–1990 ===
The modern tournament format began in 1987 as the Pacific-10 Men's basketball Tournament. The first incarnation of the tournament ran from 1987 to 1990, hosted at different school sites. UCLA was awarded the inaugural tournament, which was won by the Bruins. The Arizona Wildcats hosted the 1988 tournament and won. The Wildcats also won the 1989 and 1990 tournaments. Citing academic concerns, it was dropped after 1990 upon opposition from coaches, poor revenue, and poor attendance. The Pac-10 went back to having the regular season champion get awarded the automatic NCAA tournament bid for the 1990–2001 seasons. The Pac-10 also was viewed as weaker than East coast conferences that placed many teams in the NCAA tournament. The tournament was seen as more damaging to the conference than helpful. The NCAA selection show occurred during or immediately following the Sunday final. This meant the selection committee had to make a decision to have a placeholder for a potential team that depended upon the final result.

=== 2002 to 2024 ===
In 1998, the Big Ten began to hold a conference tournament, leaving the Pac-10 and Ivy League the lone conferences without postseason tournaments. (The Ivy League would not begin holding its tournament until 2017.) The Pac-10 tournament was restarted by an 8–2 vote of the athletic directors of the conference in 2000 after determining that a tournament would help increase exposure of the conference and help the seeding of the schools in the NCAA tournament. Stanford University and the University of Arizona opposed the tournament, while UCLA's and USC's votes, considered the deciding votes, were swayed by permanently hosting the tournament at Staples Center. Los Angeles is the second largest media market in the United States. The championship game has been broadcast nationally by CBS Sports. The championship game was scheduled for Saturday before selection Sunday, as opposed to the previous iteration of the tournament holding the championship on Sunday after the selection committee had completed their work.

With the 2011 championship game attracting only 12,074 paid attendees, less than two-thirds the capacity of Staples Center, commissioner Larry Scott reopened bids from other cities to host the Pac-12 Tournament. Other models including a round-robin model and hosting the tournament at conference sites have also been considered. Ultimately, Las Vegas, Los Angeles, Salt Lake City, and Seattle submitted bids for consideration.

On March 13, 2012, the Pac-12 Tournament was officially moved to the MGM Grand Garden Arena in Las Vegas, Nevada, for a three-year term. The tournament moved to T-Mobile Arena once it opened during the 2016–17 basketball season; the hosting contract between the Pac-12 and the arena ran through 2020. In October 2019, the contract was extended through 2021-2022.

The 2020 tournament began on March 11, and teams played the first round. It was cancelled on March 12 due to the COVID-19 pandemic, with no further games played. The 2021 tournament was played, but with only family of student-athletes & members of the individual athletic departments as spectators in attendance. The 2024 tournament was the final one with Pac-12 teams before realignment. With only Washington State and Oregon State as members, there was no tournament in the 2024-25 or 2025-26 basketball seasons.

== Television coverage ==
Effective with the 2012–13 season, as part of the new television contract signed with Fox Sports and ESPN, one quarterfinal game, one semifinal game, and the championship game will rotate between Fox Sports and ESPN, with ESPN obtaining odd year tournaments and Fox Sports even numbered tournaments. All other games are broadcast on the Pac-12 Network. On September 29, 2021, the Conference announced the Pac-12 Network, FOX & FS1 would be the telecast providers for the 2022 Pac-12 tournament. Eight games would be featured on the Pac-12 Network, two games would be featured on FS1 & the Pac-12 Tournament Title game would be featured on FOX.

== Format ==
From 1987 to 1990 and 2006 to 2011, all ten teams participated in the tournament, with the top six teams receiving a bye in the opening round. Between 2002 and 2005, only the top eight teams in the conference participated in the tournament. Of the Pac-12 schools, only Washington State has never played in the championship game. In 2010 with USC on probation, only nine teams participated. Since 2012, all 12 teams have participated with the top four teams getting byes into the quarterfinals.

== Results ==
Year	(Seed) Champion (Title #)	Score	(Seed) Runner-up	Tournament MVP	Location	Total Attendance
1987	(1) #18 UCLA (1st)	76–64	(3) Washington	Reggie Miller, UCLA	Pauley Pavilion (Los Angeles, California)	37,663
1988	(1) #3 Arizona (1st)	93–67	(2) Oregon State	Sean Elliott, Arizona	McKale Center (Tucson, Arizona)	66,477
1989	(1) #1 Arizona (2nd)	73–51	(2) #12 Stanford	Sean Elliott, Arizona	Great Western Forum (Inglewood, California)	41,994
1990	(2) #15 Arizona (3rd)	94–78	(4) UCLA	Jud Buechler & Matt Muehlebach, Arizona	University Activity Center (Tempe, Arizona)	36,052
2002	(2) #15 Arizona (4th)	81–71	(4) #22 USC	Luke Walton, Arizona	Staples Center (Los Angeles, California)	67,819
2003	(5) Oregon (1st)	74–66	(7) USC	Luke Ridnour, Oregon	Staples Center (Los Angeles, California)	63,663
2004	(1) #2 Stanford (1st)	77–66	(2) Washington	Josh Childress, Stanford	Staples Center (Los Angeles, California)	60,126
2005	(2) #14 Washington (1st)	81–72	(1) #8 Arizona	Salim Stoudamire, Arizona	Staples Center (Los Angeles, California)	62,147
2006	(1) #13 UCLA (2nd)	71–52	(3) California	Leon Powe, California	Staples Center (Los Angeles, California)	74,801
2007	(4) #16 Oregon (2nd)	81–57	(3) USC	Tajuan Porter, Oregon	Staples Center (Los Angeles, California)	84,477
2008	(1) #3 UCLA (3rd)	67–64	(2) #11 Stanford	Darren Collison, UCLA	Staples Center (Los Angeles, California)	81,809
2009	(6) USC (1st)	66–63	(4) #23 Arizona State	DeMar DeRozan, USC	Staples Center (Los Angeles, California)	77,452
2010	(3) Washington (2nd)	79–75	(1) California	Isaiah Thomas, Washington	Staples Center (Los Angeles, California)	62,292
2011	(3) Washington (3rd)	77–75 ^{OT}	(1) #16 Arizona	Isaiah Thomas, Washington	Staples Center (Los Angeles, California)	56,051
2012	(6) Colorado (1st)	53–51	(4) Arizona	Carlon Brown, Colorado	Staples Center (Los Angeles, California)	63,414
2013	(3) Oregon (3rd)	78–69	(1) #21 UCLA	Johnathan Loyd, Oregon	MGM Grand Garden Arena (Paradise, Nevada)	63,750
2014	(2) UCLA (4th)	75–71	(1) #4 Arizona	Kyle Anderson, UCLA	MGM Grand Garden Arena (Paradise, Nevada)	69,445
2015	(1) #5 Arizona (5th)	80–52	(2) Oregon	Brandon Ashley, Arizona	MGM Grand Garden Arena (Paradise, Nevada)	70,563
2016	(1) #5 Oregon (4th)	88–57	(2) #12 Utah	Elgin Cook, Oregon	MGM Grand Garden Arena (Paradise, Nevada)	77,496
2017	(2) #7 Arizona† (6th)	83–80	(1) #5 Oregon	Allonzo Trier, Arizona	T-Mobile Arena (Paradise, Nevada)	87,910
2018	(1) #15 Arizona† (7th)	75–61	(2) USC	Deandre Ayton, Arizona	T-Mobile Arena (Paradise, Nevada)	80,550
2019	(6) Oregon (5th)	68–48	(1) Washington	Payton Pritchard, Oregon	T-Mobile Arena (Paradise, Nevada)	69,024
2020	Cancelled due to the coronavirus pandemic					
2021	(5) Oregon State (1st)	70–68	(3) #23 Colorado	Warith Alatishe, Oregon State	T-Mobile Arena (Paradise, Nevada)	N/A^
2022	(1) #2 Arizona (8th)	84–76	(2) #13 UCLA	Bennedict Mathurin, Arizona	T-Mobile Arena (Paradise, Nevada)	66,201
2023	(2) #8 Arizona (9th)	61–59	(1) #2 UCLA	Ąžuolas Tubelis, Arizona	T-Mobile Arena (Paradise, Nevada)	65,721
2024	(4) Oregon (6th)	75–68	(3) Colorado	N'Faly Dante, Oregon	T-Mobile Arena (Paradise, Nevada)	76,101
2025	On hiatus					
2026	On hiatus					
2027					MGM Grand Garden Arena (Paradise, Nevada)	

notes:
† Arizona vacated 2017, 2018 titles due to NCAA penalty
^According to the Pac-12, family members were allowed to attend, but the general public was not allowed. As a result, the Pac-12 has not released official attendance numbers.

== Venues ==
Venue	City	State	Appearances	Last	Years	Notes
T-Mobile Arena	Paradise	Nevada	8	2024	2017–2024	
MGM Grand Garden Arena	Paradise	Nevada	4	2016	2013–2016, 2027	
Staples Center	Los Angeles	California	11	2012	2002–2012	
Pauley Pavilion	Los Angeles	California	1	1987	1987	
McKale Center	Tucson	Arizona	1	1988	1988	
Great Western Forum	Inglewood	California	1	1989	1989	
University Activity Center	Tempe	Arizona	1	1990	1990	

== School records ==
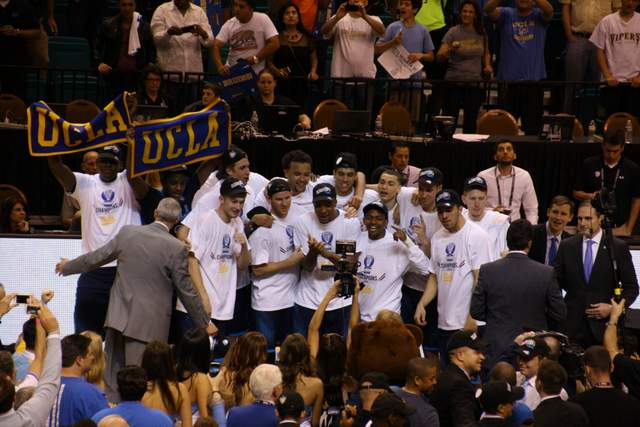
UCLA celebrating 2014 tournament championship

through March 16, 2024

School	Record	Winning Pct.	Championships	Runners-Up	Championship Years
Arizona†	42–16	.724	9	4	1988, 1989, 1990, 2002, 2015, 2017, 2018, 2022, 2023
Oregon	38–19	.667	6	2	2003, 2007, 2013, 2016, 2019, 2024
Colorado	19–12	.613	1	2	2012
UCLA	30–22	.588	4	4	1987, 2006, 2008, 2014
USC*	21–23	.488	1	4	2009
Washington	21–23	.477	3	3	2005, 2010, 2011
Stanford	19–26	.422	1	2	2004
California	18–26	.409	0	2	
Utah	8–13	.381	0	1	
Oregon State	14–23	.378	1	1	2021
Arizona State	11–25	.306	0	1	
Washington State	9–24	.273	0	0	

† Arizona vacated all tournament wins and 2017, 2018 titles due to NCAA penalty (Arizona's revised all-time tournament record - 35-15)
*USC vacated its win vs. ASU in the 2009 Pac-10 Tournament.
Washington State has yet to make an appearance in a Pac-12 Men's Basketball Championship Game.

=== Tournament MVP by School ===
through 2024 tournament

School	Total	Years
Arizona	11	1988, 1989, 1990†, 2002, 2005*, 2015, 2017, 2018, 2022, 2023
Oregon	6	2003, 2007, 2013, 2016, 2019, 2024
UCLA	3	1987, 2008, 2014
Washington	2	2010, 2011
California	1	2006*
Colorado	1	2012
Oregon State	1	2021
Stanford	1	2004
USC	1	2009
Arizona State	0	
Utah	0	
Washington State	0	

†Arizona had Co-MVP winners for the 1990 tournament.

*Arizona & California are the only schools to have a tournament MVP from teams that did not win the Conference Title Game.
Arizona State, Utah & Washington State have yet to have a player win tournament MVP.

=== Performance by team ===
through March 14, 2024

Teams (# of titles)		**1987**	**1988**	**1989**	**1990**	**2002**	**2003**	**2004**	**2005**	**2006**	**2007**	**2008**	**2009**	**2010**	**2011**	**2012**	**2013**	**2014**	**2015**	**2016**	**2017**	**2018**	**2019**	**2020**	**2021**	**2022**	**2023**	**2024**
**PAC-12** (26)		**(10)**	**(10)**	**(10)**	**(10)**	**(8)**	**(8)**	**(8)**	**(8)**	**(10)**	**(10)**	**(10)**	**(10)**	**(9)**	**(10)**	**(12)**	**(12)**	**(12)**	**(12)**	**(12)**	**(12)**	**(12)**	**(12)**	**(12)**	**(11)**	**(12)**	**(12)**	**(12)**
1	Arizona (9)	QF	**C**	**C**	**C**	**C**	QF	SF	F	SF	QF	QF	QF	QF	F	F	SF	F	**C**	SF	**C†**	**C†**	1R	QF	•	**C**	**C**	SF
2	Oregon (6)	SF	QF	1R	QF	SF	**C**	SF	•	SF	**C**	QF	1R	QF	SF	QF	**C**	QF	F	**C**	F	SF	**C**	QF	SF	QF	SF	**C**
3	UCLA (4)	**C**	QF	SF	F	QF	SF	QF	QF	**C**	QF	**C**	SF	SF	QF	QF	F	**C**	SF	1R	SF	SF	QF	QF	QF	F	F	QF
4	Washington (3)	F	QF	QF	1R	QF	•	F	**C**	QF	QF	1R	SF	**C**	**C**	QF	QF	1R	1R	QF	1R	1R	F	1R	1R	QF	1R	1R
5	Stanford (1)	QF	SF	F	SF	QF	QF	**C**	SF	QF	QF	F	QF	SF	1R	QF	1R	SF	QF	1R	1R	QF	1R	1R	1R	QF	QF	QF
5	USC (1)	1R	1R	QF	QF	F	F	QF	•	QF	F	SF	**C**	•	SF	1R	1R	1R	QF	QF	QF	F	QF	QF	SF	SF	QF	QF
5	Oregon State (1)	QF	F	SF	QF	•	QF	•	SF	QF	1R	1R	1R	QF	QF	SF	1R	1R	1R	QF	1R	QF	QF	QF	**C**	1R	1R	1R
5	Colorado (1)	•	•	•	•	•	•	•	•	•	•	•	•	•	•	**C**	QF	SF	QF	QF	QF	QF	SF	1R	F	SF	QF	F
9	California (0)	SF	QF	QF	QF	SF	SF	QF	QF	F	SF	QF	QF	F	QF	SF	QF	QF	QF	SF	SF	1R	1R	QF	QF	1R	1R	1R
9	Arizona State (0)	QF	1R	1R	SF	QF	QF	•	QF	1R	1R	QF	F	QF	1R	1R	QF	QF	1R	1R	QF	1R	SF	QF	QF	1R	SF	1R
9	Utah (0)	•	•	•	•	•	•	•	•	•	•	•	•	•	•	1R	SF	QF	SF	F	QF	QF	QF	1R	QF	1R	1R	QF
11	Washington State (0)	1R	SF	QF	1R	•	•	QF	QF	1R	SF	SF	QF	1R	QF	1R	1R	1R	1R	1R	1R	1R	1R	QF	1R	QF	QF	SF

† Arizona vacated 2017, 2018 titles due to NCAA penalty
Key

**C**	Champion
F	Runner-up
SF	Semifinals
QF	Quarterfinals
RR	Round Number
•	Did not participate

=== Coaches with championships ===
- 4 – Lute Olson (Arizona – 1988, 1989, 1990, 2002)
- 4 – **Dana Altman** (Oregon – 2013, 2016, 2019, 2024)
- 3 – Sean Miller (Arizona – 2015, 2017*, 2018*)
- 3 – Lorenzo Romar (Washington – 2005, 2010, 2011)
- 2 – **Tommy Lloyd** (Arizona – 2022, 2023)
- 2 – Ben Howland (UCLA – 2006, 2008)
- 2 – Ernie Kent (Oregon – 2003, 2007)
- 1 – Steve Alford (UCLA – 2014)
- 1 – **Tad Boyle** (Colorado – 2012)
- 1 – Tim Floyd (USC – 2009)
- 1 – Walt Hazzard (UCLA – 1987)
- 1 – Mike Montgomery (Stanford – 2004)
- 1 – **Wayne Tinkle** (Oregon State – 2021)

notes:
* Arizona vacated 2017, 2018 titles due to NCAA penalty

=== Coaches by all-time winning % ===
(.875) – Tommy Lloyd (Arizona), (7−1)
(.750) – Walt Hazzard (UCLA), (3−1)
(.727) – Lute Olson (Arizona), (16−6)
(.735) – Dana Altman (Oregon), (25−9)
(.720) – Sean Miller (Arizona), (18−7*)
(.667) – Tim Floyd (USC), (6−3)
(.667) – Bill Frieder (ASU), (2−1)
(.636) – Steve Alford (UCLA), (7−4)
(.606) – Tad Boyle (Colorado), (20−13)
(.600) – Jim Harrick (UCLA), (3−2)
(.579) – Ben Howland (UCLA), (11−8)
(.577) – Lorenzo Romar (Washington), (15−11)
(.571) – Henry Bibby (USC), (4−3)
(.571) – Cuonzo Martin (California), (4−3)
(.556) – Mick Cronin (UCLA), (5−4)
(.500) – Ernie Kent (Oregon/Washington St.), (11−11)
(.500) – Ben Braun (California), (7−7)
(.500) – Kyle Smith (Washington State), (4−4)
(.500) – Tony Bennett (Washington St.), (3−3)
(.500) – Steve Lavin (UCLA), (3−3)
(.500) – Ralph Miller (Oregon St.), (3−3)
(.500) – Andy Russo (Washington), (3−3)
(.500) – Murry Bartow (UCLA), (1−1)
(.471) – Andy Enfield (USC), (8−9)
(.455) – Mike Montgomery (Stanford/California), (10−12)
(.429) – Johnny Dawkins (Stanford), (6−8)
(.429) – Wayne Tinkle (OSU), (6−8)
(.412) – Larry Krystkowiak (Utah), (7−10)
(.400) – Mark Fox (California), (2−3)
(.400) – Kevin O'Neill (Arizona/USC), (2−3)
(.400) – Kelvin Sampson (Washington St.), (2−3)
(.385) – Bobby Hurley (ASU), (5−8)
(.333) – Jerod Haase (Stanford), (4−8)
(.333) – Craig Robinson (Oregon St.), (3−6)
(.333) – Lou Campanelli (Cal), (2−4)
(.333) – Jay John (OSU), (2−4)
(.333) – Don Monson (Oregon), (2−4)
(.333) – George Ravelling (USC), (2−4)
(.250) – Craig Smith (Utah), (1−3)
(.300) – Mike Hopkins (Washington), (3−7)
(.250) – Herb Sendek (ASU), (3−9)
(.000) – Mark Madsen (California), (0−1)
Note:* Miller's six wins and tournament titles in 2017 & 2018 vacated due to NCAA penalty (Miller's revised tournament record - 12-7, .632)
Coaches with at least one win are listed here. Current coaches are in bold.

=== Coaches by tournament wins ===
25 – Dana Altman (Oregon), (25−9)
20 – Tad Boyle (Colorado), (20−13)
18 – Sean Miller (Arizona), (18−7*)
16 – Lute Olson (Arizona), (16−6)
15 – Lorenzo Romar (Washington), (15−11)
11 – Ben Howland (UCLA), (11−8)
11 – Ernie Kent (Oregon/Washington State), (11−11)
10 – Mike Montgomery (Stan/Cal), (10−12)
8 – Andy Enfield (USC), (8−9)
7 – Tommy Lloyd (Arizona), (7−1)
7 – Ben Braun (Cal), (7−8)
7 – Larry Krystkowiak (Utah), (7−10)
6 – Steve Alford (UCLA), (6−3)
6 – Tim Floyd (USC), (6−3)
6 – Wayne Tinkle (OSU), (6−8)
6 – Johnny Dawkins (Stanford), (6−8)
5 – Bobby Hurley (ASU), (5−8)
5 – Mick Cronin (UCLA), (5−4)
4 – Henry Bibby (USC), (4−3)
4 – Cuonzo Martin (California), (4−3)
4 – Kyle Smith (Washington State), (4−4)
4 – Jerod Haase (Stanford), (4−8)
3 – Walt Hazzard (UCLA), (3−1)
3 – Jim Harrick (UCLA), (3−2)
3 – Steve Lavin (UCLA), (3−3)
3 – Andy Russo (Washington), (3−3)
3 – Mike Hopkins (Washington), (3−7)
3 – Craig Robinson (OSU), (3−6)
3 – Herb Sendek (ASU), (3−9)
2 – Bill Frieder (ASU), (2−1)
2 – Mark Fox (California), (2−3)
2 – Kelvin Sampson (WSU), (2−3)
2 – Lou Campanelli (Cal), (2−4)
2 – Jay John (OSU), (2−4)
2 – Don Monson (Oregon), (2−4)
1 – Murray Bartow (UCLA), (1−1)
1 – Craig Smith (Utah), (1−3)
0 – Mark Madsen (California), (0−1)
Note:* Miller's six wins and tournament titles in 2017 & 2018 vacated due to NCAA penalty (Miller's revised tournament record - 12-7, .632)
Only coaches with 1 or more wins listed here. As of March 16, 2024

=== All-time records by seed ===
As of March 16, 2024

Seed	Record	Winning Pct	Championships
1	51–16*	(.761)	10
2	39–20*	(.661)	6
3	29–22	(.569)	3
4	26–25**	(.510)	1
5	23–24	(.489)	2
6	25–24	(.510)	3
7	20–27	(.426)	0
8	16–26	(.381)	0
9	11–23	(.324)	0
10	7–21	(.250)	0
11	2–12	(.143)	0
12	1–12	(.077)	0

*Arizona vacated all wins & titles from 2017, 2018 due to NCAA penalty
**USC vacated its win vs. ASU in the 2009 Pac-10 Tournament.

== Pac-12 Tournament records ==
=== Pac-12 Tournament team records ===
- Margin of victory: 33 pts., Oregon (vs. Washington State), (84–51), Mar. 13, 2019 & Utah (vs. Arizona State), (90–57), Mar. 13, 2024
- Most points per game: 103 USC, (vs. Stanford) (78), Mar. 7, 2002
- Fewest points per game: 39 Utah vs. Arizona, Mar. 13, 2014
- Most points per half: 59 ARIZ vs. OSU (21), Mar. 12, 2008 (1st); 59 ORE vs. COLO (48), Mar. 12, 2015
- Fewest points per half: 13 UTAH vs. ARIZ (34), Mar. 13, 2014
- Most points per tournament: 278 Arizona, (3 games) Mar. 1988
- Most field goals per game
  - Team: 39 UCLA, (vs. ASU) (39-of-71), Mar. 6, 1987
  - Both Teams: 70, UCLA (39) vs. ASU (31), Mar. 6, 1987;
  - Both Teams: 70, Arizona (37) vs. OSU (33), Mar. 11, 1989
- Most field goal attempts per game
  - Team: 88, Arizona (vs. UCLA), Mar. 13, 2003 (33-of-88) (OT)
  - Both Teams, Game: 157, UCLA (69) vs. ARIZ (88), Mar. 13, 2003 (OT)
- Highest Field Goals % per game: 68.3%, CAL vs. USC, Mar. 10, 1988 (28-of-41)
- Most Assists Per Game: 23, ARIZ vs. OSU, Mar. 11, 1989
- Most Steals Per Game: 14, USC vs. CAL, Mar. 14, 2003; 14, ASU vs. USC, Mar. 13, 2008;
  - 14, UCLA vs. USC, Mar. 13, 2009
- Most blocked shots per game: 9, ORE vs. WASH, Mar. 7, 2002
- Most personal fouls per game (one team): 42, Oregon 42 (vs. UCLA) (1990)
- Highest field goal percentage per game: .683, CAL vs. USC, Mar. 10, 1988 (28-of-41)
- Lowest field goal percentage per game: .255 Utah vs. Arizona, Mar. 13, 2014 (12-of-47)

=== Pac-12 Tournament individual records ===
- Most total points scored in:
  - Half: 25, Klay Thompson, Washington State vs. Washington, Mar. 10, 2011 (2nd)
  - Game: 43, Klay Thompson, Washington State vs. Washington, Mar. 10, 2011
  - Tournament: 83, Reggie Miller, UCLA, 1987 (3 games)
- Most field goals per :
  - Game: 15, Reggie Miller, UCLA vs. Arizona State, Mar. 6, 1987 (15-of 20)
  - 15, Klay Thompson, Washington State vs. Washington, Mar. 10, 2011 (15-of-29)
  - Tournament: 27, Reggie Miller, UCLA, 1987 (3 games)
- Most field goal attempts per:
  - Game: 29, Klay Thompson, Washington State vs. Washington, Mar. 10, 2011 (15-of-29)
  - Tournament: 60, Brook Lopez, Stanford, 2008 (25-of-60, 3 games)
- Field goal percentage per:
  - Game (min 10 made): 1.000 Bryce Taylor, Oregon vs. USC, Mar. 10, 2007 (11-of-11)
  - Tournament (min 15 made): .791 Isaac Austin, Arizona State, 1988 (19-of-24, 3 games)
- Most 3-pt. field goals made
- Game: 11 Alfonso Plummer, Utah vs. OSU, Mar. 11, 2020 (11-of-16)
- Tournament: 14 Chamberlain Oguchi, Oregon, 2006 (14-of-38, 3 games)
- Highest 3-pt. FG % (min. 3)
  - Game: 100%, Bryce Taylor, Oregon vs. USC, Mar. 10, 2007 (7-of-7)
- Most total rebounds per :
  - Game: 20 Leon Powe, California vs. USC, Mar. 9, 2006
  - Tournament: 41 André Roberson, Colorado, 2012 (4 games);
- Most steals per :
  - Game: 7 James Harden, Arizona State vs. USC, Mar. 13, 2008
  - Tournament: 10 Jordan McLaughlin, USC, 2018 (3 games)
- Most blocks per:
  - Game: 6 Josh Huestis, Stanford vs. Arizona State, Mar. 13, 2013; Malik Dime, Washington vs. USC, Mar. 8, 2017; Francis Okoro, Oregon vs. Utah, March 14, 2019; Oumar Ballo, Arizona vs. UCLA, March 12, 2022
  - Tournament: 10 Evan Mobley, USC, 2021 (2 games); 10 Kenny Wooten, Oregon, 2019 (4 games); 9 Sean Rooks, Arizona, 1990 (3 games); Kingsley Okoroh, California, 2017 (3 games)

=== Pac-12 Tournament final game team records ===
- Most total points scored in a final game: 172 (Arizona 94, UCLA 78)(1990)

== See also ==
- Pac-12 Conference women's basketball tournament
