= 2004–05 Stanford Cardinal men's basketball team =

American college basketball season

2004–05 Stanford Cardinal men's basketball

2005 NCAA Division I men's basketball tournament, first round
- Conference: Pacific-10 Conference
- Record: 18–13 (11–7 Pac-10)
- Head coach: Trent Johnson (1st season)
- Assistant coaches: Eric Reveno; Tony Fuller; L. J. Hepp
- Home arena: Maples Pavilion (Capacity: 7,233)

2004–05 Pacific-10 Conference men's basketball standings
	Conf.				Overall
Team	W		L	PCT	W		L	PCT
No. 9 Arizona	15	–	3	.833	30	–	7	.811
Washington†	14	–	4	.778	29	–	6	.829
No. 18 UCLA ^{1}	11	–	7	.611	18	–	11	.621
Stanford	11	–	7	.611	18	–	13	.581
Oregon State	8	–	10	.444	17	–	15	.531
Arizona State ^{1}	7	–	11	.389	18	–	14	.563
Washington State	7	–	11	.389	12	–	16	.429
Oregon ^{1}	6	–	12	.333	14	–	13	.519
California	6	–	12	.333	13	–	16	.448
USC	5	–	13	.278	12	–	17	.414
† Conference tournament winner As of April 8, 2005; Rankings from Coaches Poll^{1} Holds tie-breaker

The 2004–05 Stanford Cardinal men's basketball team represented Stanford University in the 2004–05 NCAA Division I men's basketball season. It was Trent Johnson's first season with the Cardinal after Mike Montgomery left to join the NBA Golden State Warriors. The Cardinal were a member of the Pacific-10 Conference. Stanford finished with an overall record of 18–13 (11–7 Pac-10) In the NCAA Tournament they lost to Mississippi State 93–70.

== Previous season ==
The Cardinal finished the 2003–04 season 30–2 and ranked as high as #1. In Pac-10 play they finished 17–1, only losing to Washington in the last game of the regular season. The Cardinal won the Pac-10 tournament defeating Washington State, next Oregon, and in the Finals a revenge win over Washington.

After finishing the regular season and Pac-10 Tournament with only one loss, the Cardinal punched their ticket to the NCAA tournament after winning their tournament. In the NCAA Tournament they received a #1 seed in the Phoenix region facing off against the Southland Conference tournament champion UTSA. In the second round they faced Alabama but lost to them 70–67.

== Roster ==
Number	Name	Position	Height	Weight	Year	Hometown
3	Carlton Weatherby	Guard	6'1"	180	Junior	Tacoma, WA
10	Tim Morris	Guard	6'4"	215	RS Freshman	Atlanta, GA
11	Chris Hernandez	Guard	6'2"	190	Junior	Fresno, CA
20	Dan Grunfeld	Guard	6'6"	215	Junior	River Hills, WI
21	Nick Robinson	Forward	6'6"	205	Senior	Liberty, MO
22	Kenny Brown	Guard	6'1"	190	Freshman	Southlake, TX
31	Taj Finger	Forward	6'8"	185	Freshman	Mt. Kisco, NY
32	Jason Haas	Guard	6'2"	190	Junior	Spring Mills, PA
42	Rob Little	Center	6'10"	260	Senior	Hampton, VA
44	Fred Washington	Forward	6'5"	205	Sophomore	Los Angeles, CA
52	Matt Haryasz	Forward	6'11"	230	Junior	Page, AZ
55	Peter Prowitt	Center	6'10"	250	Freshman	Arlington, VA

== Schedule and results ==
Date time, TV	Rank^{#}	Opponent^{#}	Result	Record	Site (attendance) city, state
Exhibition
Nov 13, 2004*		at Concordia (CA.)	W 88-64	-	Santa Clara, CA
Non-conference regular season
Nov 19, 2004*; 8:30 pm, CSTV		vs. San Francisco; Pete Newell Challenge	W 93-83 ^{OT}	1-0	Oakland Arena (12,313); Oakland, CA
Nov 22, 2004*; 8:30 pm, ESPN2		vs. Tennessee; EA Sports Maui Invitational Quarterfinals	L 57-69	1-1	Lahaina Civic Center (2,500); Maui, HI
Nov 23, 2004*; 1:00 pm		vs. BYU; EA Sports Maui Invitational Consolation Game	W 62-53	2-1	Lahaina Civic Center (2,500); Maui, HI
Nov 24, 2004*; 11:00 am, ESPN2		vs. No. 12 Louisville; EA Sports Maui Invitational 5th Place Game	L 67-82	2-2	Lahaina Civic Center (2,500); Maui, HI
Nov 28, 2004*; 7:00 pm, FS Bay Area		at Santa Clara	L 76-86	2-3	Leavey Center (3,205); Santa Clara, CA
Dec 11, 2004*; 1:00 pm, CBS		vs. No. 20 Michigan State	L 53-78	2-4	The Palace of Auburn Hills (20,067); Auburn Hills, MI
Dec 13, 2004*; 6:00 pm, FS Bay Area		at Denver	W 56-52	3-4	Magness Arena (6,535); Denver, CO
Dec 18, 2004*; 7:00 pm, KRON		UC Davis	W 72-62	4-4	Maples Pavilion (5,002); Stanford, CA
Nov 13, 2004*; 7:00 pm, Comcast		Dartmouth	W 71-54	5-4	Maples Pavilion (4,430); Stanford, CA
Nov 13, 2004*; 7:00 pm, Comcast		Montana	W 84-66	6-4	Maples Pavilion (4,332); Stanford, CA
Pac-10 Regular season
Dec 31, 2004; 5:00 pm, FS Bay Area		vs. Washington State	L 51-60	6-5 (0-1)	The Spokane Arena (3,526); Spokane, WA
Jan 2, 2005; 12:30 pm		at No. 13 Washington	L 73-76	6-6 (0-2)	Bank of America Arena (10,000); Seattle, WA
Jan 6, 2005; 7:00 pm		Arizona State	L 69-81	6-7 (0-3)	Maples Pavilion (5,988); Stanford, CA
Jan 8, 2005; 12:00 pm, FSN		No. 13 Arizona	W 87-76	7-7 (1-3)	Maples Pavilion (7,233); Stanford, CA
Jan 15, 2005; 1:00 pm, FSN		at California	W 74-58	8-7 (2-3)	Haas Pavilion (9,656); Berkeley, CA
Jan 20, 2005; 7:30 pm, FS Bay Area		at UCLA	W 75-64	9-7 (3-3)	Pauley Pavilion (8,255); Los Angeles, CA
Jan 22, 2005; 3:00 pm, ABC		at USC	W 78-70	10-7 (4-3)	Los Angeles Sports Arena (3,447); Los Angeles, CA
Jan 27, 2005; 7:00 pm		Oregon State	W 69-65	11-7 (5-3)	Maples Pavilion (5,749); Stanford, CA
Jan 29, 2005; 5:30 pm, ABC		Oregon	W 88-69	12-7 (6-3)	Maples Pavilion (7,233); Stanford, CA
Feb 3, 2005; 5:30 pm, FS Bay Area		at Arizona State	L 67-74	12-8 (6-4)	Wells Fargo Arena (8,960); Tempe, AZ
Feb 5, 2005; 10:00 am, CBS		at No. 13 Arizona	L 72-90	12-9 (6-5)	McKale Center (14,592); Tucson, AZ
Feb 12, 2005; 12:30 pm, ABC		California	W 71-56	13-9 (7-5)	Maples Pavilion; Stanford, CA
Feb 17, 2005; 7:00 pm		USC	W	14-9 (8-5)	Maples Pavilion; Stanford, CA
Feb 20, 2005; 12:30 pm, CBS		UCLA	W	15-9 (9-5)	Maples Pavilion; Stanford, CA
Feb 24, 2005; 7:05 pm		at Oregon State	L 83-84	15-10 (9-6)	Gill Coliseum (6,568); Corvallis, OR
Feb 26, 2005; 4:00 pm, ABC		at Oregon	W 58-56	16-10 (10-6)	McArthur Court (9,087); Eugene, OR
Mar 3, 2005; 7:00 pm		Washington State	L 48-59	16-11 (10-7)	Maples Pavilion (5,784); Stanford, CA
Mar 5, 2005; 1:00 pm, CBS		No. 10 Washington	W 77-67	17-11 (11-7)	Maples Pavilion (7,233); Stanford, CA
Pac-10 tournament
Mar 10, 2005; 8:45 pm, FSN		vs. Washington State; Pac-10 Tournament quarterfinals	W 60-58	18-11	Staples Center (14,393); Los Angeles, CA
Mar 11, 2005; 8:45 pm, FSN		vs. No. (2) Washington; Pac-10 Tournament semifinals	L 63-66	18-12	Staples Center (15,068); Los Angeles, CA
NCAA tournament
Mar 18, 2005*; 7:45 pm, CBS	No. (8)	vs. No. (9) Mississippi State; First Round	L 70-93	18-13	Charlotte Coliseum (23,027); Charlotte, NC
*Non-conference game. ^{#}Rankings from AP Poll. (#) Tournament seedings in parentheses. All times are in Pacific Time.
