= 2004–05 Arizona Wildcats men's basketball team =

American college basketball season

2004–05 Arizona Wildcats men's basketball

Pac-10 Regular Season Champions

NCAA Tournament, Elite Eight
- Conference: Pacific-10 Conference

Ranking
- Coaches: No. 6
- AP: No. 9
- Record: 30–7 (15–3 Pac-10)
- Head coach: Lute Olson (22nd season)
- Assistant coaches: Jim Rosborough; Rodney Tention; Josh Pastner
- Home arena: McKale Center

2004–05 Pacific-10 Conference men's basketball standings
	Conf.				Overall
Team	W		L	PCT	W		L	PCT
No. 9 Arizona	15	–	3	.833	30	–	7	.811
Washington†	14	–	4	.778	29	–	6	.829
No. 18 UCLA ^{1}	11	–	7	.611	18	–	11	.621
Stanford	11	–	7	.611	18	–	13	.581
Oregon State	8	–	10	.444	17	–	15	.531
Arizona State ^{1}	7	–	11	.389	18	–	14	.563
Washington State	7	–	11	.389	12	–	16	.429
Oregon ^{1}	6	–	12	.333	14	–	13	.519
California	6	–	12	.333	13	–	16	.448
USC	5	–	13	.278	12	–	17	.414
† Conference tournament winner As of April 8, 2005; Rankings from Coaches Poll^{1} Holds tie-breaker

The 2004–05 Arizona Wildcats men's basketball team represented the University of Arizona during the 2004–05 NCAA Division I men's basketball season. Hall-of-Famer Lute Olson led the team in his 22nd year as Arizona's head coach. The team played their home games at McKale Center in Tucson, Arizona as members of the Pacific-10 Conference.

The Wildcats recorded 30 or more wins for the third time in program history with a record of 30–7 overall. A 15–3 record in conference play earned Olson and Arizona an 11th Pacific-10 Conference championship.

Arizona was invited to the NCAA tournament for the 21st-straight season, receiving a 3-seed in the Midwest Region. The team advanced to the Elite Eight by defeating (14-seed) Utah State, (11) UAB, and (2) Oklahoma State before falling 90–89 in overtime to top-seeded Illinois.

== Roster ==
2004–05 Arizona Wildcats men's basketball team
Players
Coaches

Pos.	#	Name	Height	Weight	Year	Previous school	Hometown
F	2	Isaiah Fox	6 ft 9 in (2.06 m)	260 lb (118 kg)	Jr	Crossroads School	Santa Monica, California
G	5	Jawann McClellan	6 ft 4 in (1.93 m)	215 lb (98 kg)	Fr	Milby High School	Houston, Texas
G	12	Daniel Dillon	6 ft 3 in (1.91 m)	205 lb (93 kg)	Fr	North Laurel High School	Melbourne, Victoria
G	13	Chris Rodgers	6 ft 4 in (1.93 m)	210 lb (95 kg)	Jr	Wilson High School	Portland, Oregon
G	14	Beau Muhlbach (W)	6 ft 3 in (1.91 m)	200 lb (91 kg)	So	Lufkin High School	Lufkin, Texas
G	15	Mustafa Shakur	6 ft 3 in (1.91 m)	185 lb (84 kg)	So	Friends' Central School	Philadelphia, Pennsylvania
G	20	Salim Stoudamire	6 ft 1 in (1.85 m)	180 lb (82 kg)	Sr	Lake Oswego High School	Portland, Oregon
G	21	Hassan Adams	6 ft 4 in (1.93 m)	210 lb (95 kg)	Jr	Westchester High School	Los Angeles, California
G/F	23	Jesus Verdejo	6 ft 4 in (1.93 m)	190 lb (86 kg)	Fr	The Winchendon School	Carolina, Puerto Rico
F	30	Matt Brase	6 ft 6 in (1.98 m)	225 lb (102 kg)	Sr	Central Arizona College	Tucson, Arizona
F	33	Mohamed Tangara	6 ft 9 in (2.06 m)	240 lb (109 kg)	Fr	Mount Zion Christian Academy	Bamako, Mali
F	44	Bret Brielmaier (W)	6 ft 6 in (1.98 m)	215 lb (98 kg)	Fr	Loyola Catholic School	Mankato, Minnesota
C	45	Channing Frye	6 ft 11 in (2.11 m)	250 lb (113 kg)	Sr	St. Mary's High School	Phoenix, Arizona
C	54	Kirk Walters	6 ft 10 in (2.08 m)	235 lb (107 kg)	So	South Christian High School	Grand Rapids, Michigan
F	55	Ivan Radenović	6 ft 10 in (2.08 m)	220 lb (100 kg)	So	Secondary School of Sports	Belgrade, Serbia

Head coach

- Lute Olsen (Augsburg)

Assistant coach(es)

- Jim Rosborough (Iowa)
- Rodney Tention (San Francisco)
- Josh Pastner (Arizona)

Legend

- (C) Team captain
- (S) Suspended
- (I) Ineligible
- (W) Walk-on
- Injured
- Current redshirt

Roster

=== Depth chart ===
Pos.	Starting 5	Bench 1	Bench 2
C	Channing Frye	Kirk Walters	Mohamed Tangara
PF	Ivan Radenovic	Isaiah Fox	Matt Brase
SF	Hassan Adams	Jesus Vergejo	Bret Brielmaier
SG	Salim Stoudamire	Jawann McClellan
PG	Mustafa Shakur	Chris Rodgers	Daniel Dillon

== Schedule ==
Date time, TV	Rank^{#}	Opponent^{#}	Result	Record	High points	High rebounds	High assists	Site (attendance) city, state
Regular season
11/14/2004*; 7:00 pm, FSN Arizona	No. 10	San Diego; Preseason N.I.T. campus-site game	W 80–69	1–0	23 – Shakur	10 – 2 tied	7 – 2 tied	McKale Center (14,514); Tucson, Arizona
11/18/2004*; 7:00 pm, FSN Arizona	No. 10	Wright State; Preseason N.I.T. campus-site game	W 83–66	2–0	24 – Stoudamire	8 – Fox	6 – 2 tied	McKale Center (14,529); Tucson, Arizona
11/21/2004*; 2:00 pm, FSN Arizona	No. 10	at Virginia	L 60–78	2–1	17 – Frye	11 – Frye	6 – Shakur	University Hall (7,792); Charlottesville, Virginia
11/24/2004*; 7:30 pm, ESPN	No. 18	vs. Michigan; Preseason N.I.T. Semifinal	W 61–60 ^{OT}	3–1	13 – Shakur	13 – Frye	6 – Shakur	Madison Square Garden; New York, New York
11/26/2004*; 5:00 pm, ESPN	No. 18	vs. No. 1 Wake Forest; Preseason N.I.T. Final	L 60–63	3–2	19 – Adams	8 – 2 tied	6 – Shakur	Madison Square Garden (9,480); New York, New York
11/30/2004*; 7:00 pm, FSN Arizona	No. 21	Wyoming	W 98–70	4–2	19 – 2 tied	8 – Adams	7 – Shakur	McKale Center (14,527); Tucson, AZ
12/5/2004*; 1:30 pm, CBS	No. 21	vs. No. 15 Mississippi State; John Wooden Classic	W 68–64	5–2	18 – Frye	16 – Frye	9 – Shakur	Arrowhead Pond (14,027); Anaheim, California
12/11/2004*; 11:00 am, FSN Arizona	No. 15	Utah	W 67–62	6–2	19 – Frye	9 – Frye	4 – Shakur	McKale Center (14,533); Tucson, AZ
12/18/2004*; 12:00 pm, ESPN	No. 15	at Marquette	W 48–43	7–2	16 – Rodgers	11 – Frye	4 – Shakur	Bradley Center (17,624); Milwaukee, Wisconsin
12/21/2004*; 6:30 pm, FSN Arizona	No. 14	Manhattan	W 105–75	8–2	23 – Stoudamire	11 – Frye	4 – 2 tied	McKale Center (14,515); Tucson, AZ
12/28/2004*; 6:30 pm, FSN Arizona	No. 14	Eastern Washington; Fiesta Bowl Classic Semifinal	W 79–45	9–2	16 – Frye	6 – 2 tied	5 – Adams	McKale Center (14,535); Tucson, AZ
12/30/2004*; 6:30 pm, FSN Arizona	No. 14	Richmond; Fiesta Bowl Classic Final	W 84–71	10–2	20 – Rodgers	9 – Radenovic	4 – 2 tied	McKale Center (14,545); Tucson, AZ
1/2/2005; 1:30 pm	No. 14	Arizona State; Rivalry	W 97–79	11–2 (1–0)	21 – Frye	10 – Adams	7 – Adams	McKale Center (14,546); Tucson, Arizona
1/6/2005; 7:30 pm	No. 13	at California	W 87–67	12–2 (2–0)	20 – Frye	8 – Frye	7 – Shakur	Haas Pavilion (9,350); Berkeley, California
1/8/2005; 1:00 pm	No. 13	at Stanford	L 76–87	12–3 (2–1)	20 – Frye	12 – Frye	4 – 2 tied	Maples Pavilion (7,233); Stanford, California
1/13/2005; 8:30 pm	No. 17	USC	W 77–68	13–3 (3–1)	21 – Stoudamire	5 – 4 tied	4 – Rodgers	McKale Center (14,568); Tucson, AZ
1/15/2005; 4:00 pm	No. 17	UCLA; Rivalry	W 76–73	14–3 (4–1)	32 – Stoudamire	14 – Radenovic	4 – Shakur	McKale Center (14,559); Tucson, AZ
1/20/2005; 7:30 pm	No. 13	at Oregon	W 74–66	15–3 (5–1)	27 – Stoudamire	7 – Frye	6 – Adams	McArthur Court (9,087); Eugene, Oregon
1/22/2005; 5:00 pm	No. 13	at Oregon State	W 92–83	16–3 (6–1)	25 – Stoudamire	7 – Frye	6 – Adams	Gill Coliseum (10,016); Corvallis, Oregon
1/27/2005; 6:30 pm	No. 11	No. 10 Washington	W 91–82	17–3 (7–1)	25 – Stoudamire	7 – Adams	6 – Shakur	McKale Center (14,597); Tucson, AZ
1/29/2005; 12:00 pm	No. 11	Washington State	L 63–70	17–4 (7–2)	12 – Shakur	Radenovic – 10	3 – Shakur	McKale Center (14,596); Tucson, AZ
2/3/2005; 8:30 pm	No. 14	California	W 97–76	18–4 (8–2)	20 – Frye	7 – Frye	8 – Shakur	McKale Center (14,591); Tucson, AZ
2/5/2005; 11:00 am	No. 14	Stanford	W 80–72	19–4 (9–2)	26 – Stoudamire	13 – Frye	6 – Shakur	McKale Center (14,592); Tucson, AZ
2/10/2005; 7:30 pm	No. 12	at USC	W 88–76	20–4 (10–2)	26 – Stoudamire	12 – Radenovic	5 – Shakur	Los Angeles Memorial Sports Arena (4,415); Los Angeles, California
2/12/2005; 5:00 pm	No. 12	at UCLA; Rivalry	W 80–73	21–4 (11–2)	22 – Stoudamire	12 – Radenovic	3 – Adams	Pauley Pavilion (12,681); Los Angeles, California
2/17/2005; 5:30 pm	No. 10	Oregon	W 92–67	22–4 (12–2)	22 – Stoudamire	7 – Radenovic	9 – Rodgers	McKale Center (14,597); Tucson, AZ
2/20/2005; 2:30 pm	No. 10	Oregon State	W 91–70	23–4 (13–2)	31 – Stoudamire	11 – Frye	5 – Shakur	McKale Center (14,592); Tucson, AZ
2/24/2005; 6:30 pm	No. 9	at Washington State	W 57–56 ^{OT}	24–4 (14–2)	26 – Frye	8 – 3 tied	4 – Stoudamire	Friel Court (4,259); Pullman, Washington
2/26/2005; 4:00 pm	No. 9	at No. 10 Washington	L 85–93	24–5 (14–3)	30 – Frye	9 – Adams	7 – Shakur	Hec Edmundson Pavilion (10,000); Seattle, Washington
3/5/2005; 4:00 pm	No. 11	at Arizona State; Rivalry	W 70–68	25–5 (15–3)	22 – Stoudamire	9 – Frye	4 – Shakur	Wells Fargo Arena (14,141); Tempe, Arizona
Pac-10 tournament
3/10/2005; 1:20 pm, FSN	No. 8	vs. California; Quarterfinal	W 88–63	26–5	22 – Frye	7 – Radenovic	8 – Shakure	Staples Center (14,014); Los Angeles, CA
3/11/2005; 8:15 pm, FSN	No. 8	vs. Oregon State; Semifinal	W 90–59	27–5	17 – 2 tied	7 – Frye	4 – Adams	Staples Center (16,500); Los Angeles, CA
3/12/2005; 4:00 pm, FSN	No. 8	vs. No. 14 Washington; Final	L 72–81	27–6	37 – Stoudamire	6 – Frye	3 – 2 tied	Staples Center (18,672); Los Angeles, CA
NCAA tournament
3/17/2005*; 5:20 pm, CBS	(3) No. 9	vs. (14) Utah State; First Round	W 66–53	28–6	17 – 2 tied	10 – Frye	7 – Shakur	Taco Bell Arena (11,894); Boise, ID
3/19/2005*; 3:50 pm, CBS	(3) No. 9	vs. (11) Alabama—Birmingham; Second Round	W 85–63	29–6	28 – Stoudamire	10 – Adams	4 – Rodgers	Taco Bell Arena (11,891); Boise, ID
3/24/2005*; 8:00 pm, CBS	(3) No. 9	vs. (2) No. 6 Oklahoma State; Sweet Sixteen	W 79–78	30–6	19 – 2 tied	10 – 2 tied	7 – Stoudamire	Allstate Arena (16,957); Rosemont, IL
3/26/2005*; 5:15 pm, CBS	(3) No. 9	vs. (1) No. 1 Illinois; Elite Eight	L 89–90 ^{OT}	30–7	24 – Frye	12 – Frye	5 – Adams	Allstate Arena (16,957); Rosemont, IL
*Non-conference game. ^{#}Rankings from AP Poll. (#) Tournament seedings in parentheses. All times are in Mountain Time.
