= 2004–05 Washington State Cougars men's basketball team =

American college basketball season

2004–05 Washington State Cougars men's basketball
- Conference: Pacific-10 Conference
- Record: 12–16 (7–11 Pac-10)
- Head coach: Dick Bennett (2nd season)
- Assistant coach: Tony Bennett
- Home arena: Beasley Coliseum

2004–05 Pacific-10 Conference men's basketball standings
	Conf.				Overall
Team	W		L	PCT	W		L	PCT
No. 9 Arizona	15	–	3	.833	30	–	7	.811
Washington†	14	–	4	.778	29	–	6	.829
No. 18 UCLA ^{1}	11	–	7	.611	18	–	11	.621
Stanford	11	–	7	.611	18	–	13	.581
Oregon State	8	–	10	.444	17	–	15	.531
Arizona State ^{1}	7	–	11	.389	18	–	14	.563
Washington State	7	–	11	.389	12	–	16	.429
Oregon ^{1}	6	–	12	.333	14	–	13	.519
California	6	–	12	.333	13	–	16	.448
USC	5	–	13	.278	12	–	17	.414
† Conference tournament winner As of April 8, 2005; Rankings from Coaches Poll^{1} Holds tie-breaker

The 2004–05 Washington State Cougars men's basketball team represented Washington State University for the 2004–05 NCAA Division I men's basketball season. Led by second-year head coach Dick Bennett, the Cougars were members of the Pacific-10 Conference and played their home games on campus at Beasley Coliseum in Pullman, Washington.

The Cougars were 12–15 overall in the regular season and 7–11 in conference play, tied for sixth in the standings.

Seeded sixth in the conference tournament, the Cougars met third seed Stanford in the quarterfinal round. The Cougars had swept the regular season series, but lost by two points.

== Postseason result ==
Date time, TV	Opponent	Result	Record	Site (attendance) city, state
Pacific-10 Tournament
Thu, March 10; 8:45 pm, FSN	vs. (3) Stanford; Quarterfinal	L 58–60	12–16	Staples Center (14,393); Los Angeles, California
*Non-conference game. ^{#}Rankings from AP poll. (#) Tournament seedings in parentheses. All times are in Pacific time.
