= Washington Huskies men's basketball =

Basketball team

2026–27 Washington Huskies men's basketball team
- University: University of Washington
- First season: 1895–96; 131 years ago
- Athletic director: Patrick Chun
- Head coach: Danny Sprinkle; 3rd season, 29–35 (.453)
- Location: Seattle, Washington
- Arena: Hec Edmundson Pavilion (capacity: 10,000)
- NCAA division: Division I
- Conference: Big Ten
- Nickname: Huskies
- Colors: Purple and gold
- Student section: Dawg Pack
- All-time record: 1,896–1,305 (.592)
- NCAA tournament record: 19–18 (.514)

NCAA Division I tournament third place
- 1953
Other NCAA Division I tournament results
Final Four	1953
Elite Eight	1943, 1948, 1951, 1953
Sweet Sixteen	1951, 1953, 1984, 1998, 2005, 2006, 2010
Appearances	1943, 1948, 1951, 1953, 1976, 1984, 1985, 1986, 1998, 1999, 2004, 2005, 2006, 2009, 2010, 2011, 2019

Conference tournament champions
- Pac-12: 2005, 2010, 2011

Conference regular-season champions
- Northwest: 1911, 1914, 1915 PCC: 1931, 1934, 1943, 1944, 1948, 1951, 1953 Pac-12: 1984, 1985, 2009, 2012, 2019

Conference division champions
- PCC North: 1923, 1924, 1928, 1929, 1930, 1931, 1932, 1934, 1936, 1937, 1943, 1944, 1948, 1951, 1952, 1953

Uniforms
Home	Away	Alternate

The Washington Huskies men's basketball team represents the University of Washington in NCAA Division I college basketball competing in the Big Ten Conference. Their home games are played at Hec Edmundson Pavilion, located in Seattle, and they are currently led by head coach Danny Sprinkle.

== Hec Edmundson Pavilion ==
Hec Edmundson Pavilion is the home of the Huskies men's and women's basketball teams, volleyball team and gymnastics squad. The 2020–21 season marked the 94th season of service for the multi-purpose facility.

The facility was originally completed in December 1927. Wilson James Commissioning renovated the interior of Hec Edmundson Pavilion for $40 million. The renovation took 19 months, between March 1999 and November 2000.

The pavilion's name was also changed; originally slated to be "Seafirst Arena at Hec Edmundson Pavilion" when the deal was finalized in 1998, it became "Bank of America Arena at Hec Edmundson Pavilion" at the reopening, as Bank of America had retired the Seafirst brand in 1999. The ten-year sponsorship with the bank expired after the 2009–10 season and was not renewed. During the first half of the 2010–11 basketball season, the venue was sponsorless and once again known simply as "Hec Edmundson Pavilion". On January 20, 2011, the university approved Seattle-based Alaska Airlines as the new sponsor of "Alaska Airlines Arena at Hec Edmundson Pavilion".

== Postseason results ==
=== NCAA tournament results ===
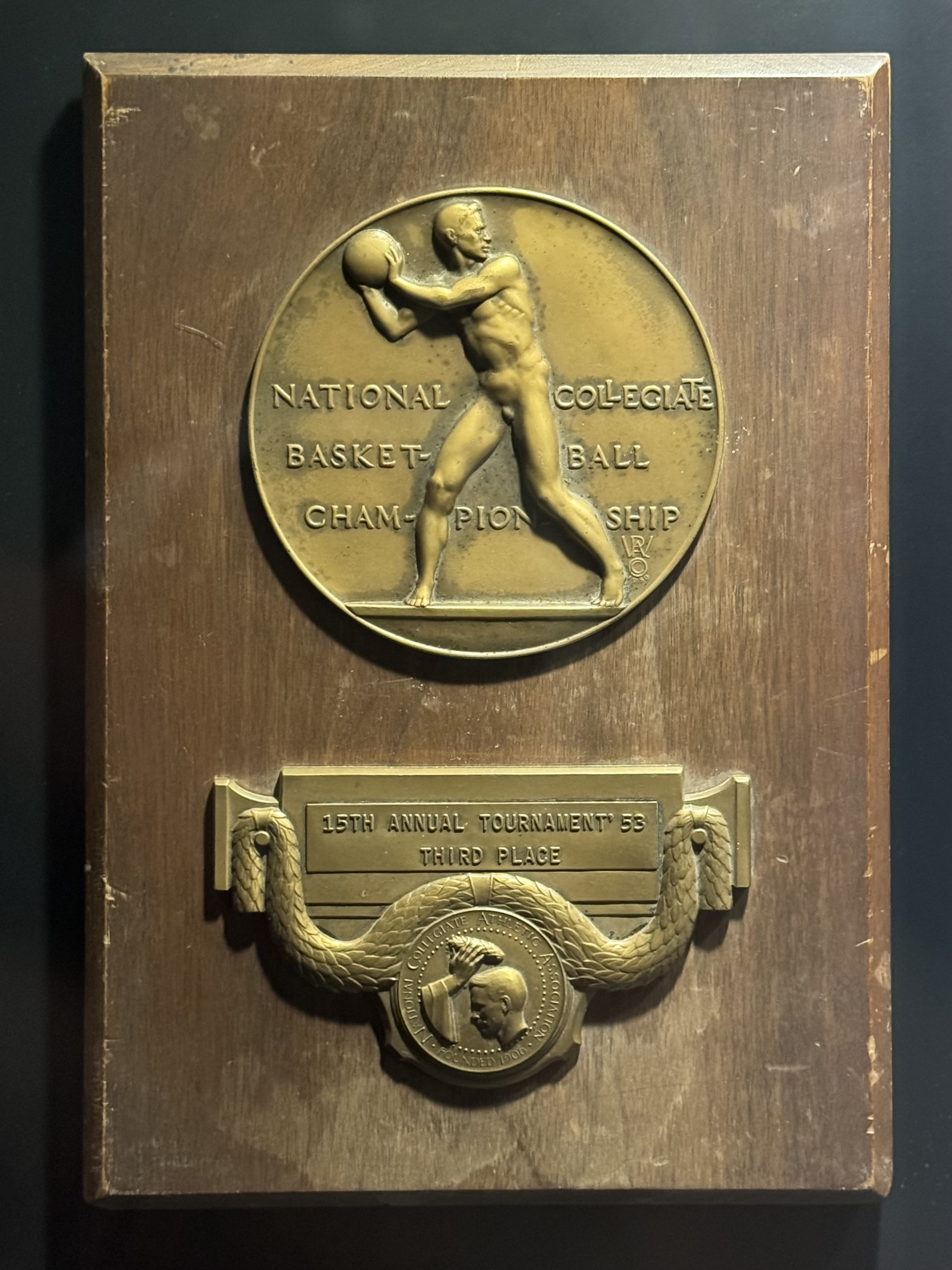
The Huskies reached the Final Four, and finished third in the 1953 NCAA Basketball Tournament.

Through 2020, the Huskies had appeared in 17 NCAA Tournaments, with an overall record of 19–18.

Year	Seed	Round	Opponent	Result/score
1943		Elite Eight; Regional 3rd Place	Texas; Oklahoma	L 55–59; L 43–48
1948		Elite Eight; Regional 3rd Place	Baylor; Wyoming	L 62–64; W 57–47
1951		Sweet Sixteen; Elite Eight; Regional 3rd Place	Texas A&M #2 Oklahoma A&M #11 BYU	W 62–40; L 57–61; W 80–67
1953		Round of 22; Sweet Sixteen; Elite Eight; Final Four; National 3rd Place	Bye; Seattle; Santa Clara #5 Kansas #7 LSU	— W 92–70; W 74–62; L 53–79; W 88–69
1976		Round of 32	#10 Missouri	L 67–69
1984	6 W	Round of 48; Round of 32; Sweet Sixteen	(11) Nevada (3) #14 Duke (10) Dayton	W 64–54; W 80–78; L 58–64
1985	5 W	Round of 64	(12) Kentucky	L 58–66
1986	12 M	Round of 64	(5) #18 Michigan State	L 70–72
1998	11 E	Round of 64; Round of 32; Sweet Sixteen	(6) #23 Xavier (14) Richmond (2) #6 Connecticut	W 69–68; W 81–66; L 74–75
1999	7 M	Round of 64	(10) Miami (OH)	L 58–59
2004	8 S	Round of 64	(9) UAB	L 100–102
2005	1 W	Round of 64; Round of 32; Sweet Sixteen	(16) Montana (8) Pacific (4) #4 Louisville	W 88–77; W 97–79; L 79–93
2006	5 E	Round of 64; Round of 32; Sweet Sixteen	(12) Utah State (4) #13 Illinois (1) #2 Connecticut	W 75–61; W 67–64; L 92–98 ^{OT}
2009	4 W	Round of 64; Round of 32	(13) Mississippi State (5) #17 Purdue	W 71–58; L 74–76
2010	11 E	Round of 64; Round of 32; Sweet Sixteen	(6) Marquette (3) #8 New Mexico (2) #6 West Virginia	W 80–78; W 82–64; L 56–69
2011	7 E	Round of 64; Round of 32	(10) Georgia (2) #7 North Carolina	W 68–65; L 83–86
2019	9 M	Round of 64; Round of 32	(8) #25 Utah State (1) #3 North Carolina	W 78–61; L 59–81

=== NIT results ===
Through 2019, the Huskies had appeared in nine National Invitation Tournaments (NIT), with an 8–9 overall record.

Year	Round	Opponent	Result/score
1980	First Round	UNLV	L 73–93
1982	First Round; Second Round	BYU; Texas A&M	W 66–63; L 65–69
1987	First Round; Second Round; Quarterfinals	Montana State; Boise State; Nebraska	W 98–90; W 73–68; L 76–81
1996	First Round	Michigan State	L 50–64
1997	First Round	Nebraska	L 63–67
2012	First Round; Second Round; Quarterfinals; Semifinals	Texas–Arlington; Northwestern; Oregon; Minnesota	W 82–72; W 76–55; W 90–86; L 67–68 ^{OT}
2013	First Round	BYU	L 79–90
2016	First Round; Second Round	Long Beach State; San Diego State	W 107–102; L 78–93
2018	First Round; Second Round	Boise State; Saint Mary's	W 77–74; L 81–85

- Conference rules (PCC / Pac-8) disallowed participation until 1973; UW's 1972 team was 20–6.

=== CBI results ===
Through 2019, the Huskies had appeared in one College Basketball Invitational (CBI), with a record of 0–1.

Year	Round	Opponent	Result/score
2008	First Round	Valparaiso	L 71–72

== Results by season (2002–present) ==
The following are Washington's recent results.

Season	Coach	Overall	Conference	Confstanding	Postseason
Lorenzo Romar (Pacific-10/Pac-12 Conference) (1990–2018)
2002–03	Lorenzo Romar	10–17	5–13	9th	
2003–04	Lorenzo Romar	19–12	12–6	2nd	NCAA First Round
2004–05	Lorenzo Romar	29–6	14–4	2nd	NCAA Sweet 16
2005–06	Lorenzo Romar	26–7	13–5	2nd	NCAA Sweet 16
2006–07	Lorenzo Romar	19–13	8–10	7th	
2007–08	Lorenzo Romar	16–17	7–11	8th	CBI First Round
2008–09	Lorenzo Romar	26–9	14–4	1st	NCAA Second Round
2009–10	Lorenzo Romar	26–10	11–7	3rd	NCAA Sweet 16
2010–11	Lorenzo Romar	24–11	11–7	3rd	NCAA Second Round
2011–12	Lorenzo Romar	24–11	14–4	1st	NIT Semifinal
2012–13	Lorenzo Romar	18–16	9–9	T-6th	NIT First Round
2013–14	Lorenzo Romar	17–15	9–9	T-9th	
2014–15	Lorenzo Romar	16–15	5–13	11th	
2015–16	Lorenzo Romar	19–15	9–9	T-6th	NIT Second Round
2016–17	Lorenzo Romar	9–22	2–16	11th	
Lorenzo Romar:		298–195	143–127		
Mike Hopkins (Pac-12 Conference) (2017–2024)
2017–18	Mike Hopkins	21–13	10–8	T-6th	NIT Second Round
2018–19	Mike Hopkins	27–9	15–3	1st	NCAA Second Round
2019–20	Mike Hopkins	15–17	5–13	12th	
2020–21	Mike Hopkins	5–21	4–16	11th	
2021–22	Mike Hopkins	17–15	11–9	T–5th	
2022–23	Mike Hopkins	16–16	8–12	T–8th	
2023–24	Mike Hopkins	17–15	9–11	T–6th	
Mike Hopkins:		118–106	62–72		
Danny Sprinkle (Big Ten Conference) (2024–present)
2024–25	Danny Sprinkle	13−18	4−16	18th	
2025–26	Danny Sprinkle	16−17	7−13	T–12th	
Danny Sprinkle:		29–35	11–29		
Total:		1897–1305 (.592)			
National champion Postseason invitational champion Conference regular season champion Conference regular season and conference tournament champion Division regular season champion Division regular season and conference tournament champion Conference tournament champion

== Conference records ==
=== Records vs. former Pac-12 opponents ===
The Washington Huskies have the following all-time series records vs. former Pac-12 opponents through the 2017–18 season.

Opponent	Wins	Losses	Pct.
Arizona	29	52	.358
Arizona St.	44	39	.524
California	80	84	.488
Colorado	14	10	.583
Oregon St.	160	142	.530
Stanford	71	77	.480
Utah	9	15	.375
Wash. St.	183	104	.638
Total	590	523	.530

=== Records vs. Big Ten opponents ===
All-time series includes non-conference matchups.

Opponent	Wins	Losses	Pct.	Streak
Illinois	2	1	(.667)	UW 1
Indiana	1	3	(.250)	Indiana 2
Iowa	3	2	(.600)	UW 1
Maryland	0	0	(–)	-
Michigan	2	1	(.667)	UW 1
Michigan State	1	4	(.200)	Michigan State 2
Minnesota	5	5	(.500)	Minnesota 1
Nebraska	3	3	(.500)	UW 1
Northwestern	6	2	(.750)	UW 2
Ohio State	3	3	(.500)	Ohio St 1
Oregon	192	123	(.610)	Oregon 2
Penn State	0	0	(–)	-
Purdue	1	4	(.200)	Purdue 3
Rutgers	0	0	(–)	-
UCLA	43	108	(.285)	UW 1
USC	72	80	(.474)	USC 9
Wisconsin	3	0	(1.000)	UW 3

Updated April 4, 2024

== Awards and honors ==
=== Retired numbers ===
Washington Huskies retired numbers
No.	Player	Tenure	No. ret.	Ref.
2	Isaiah Thomas	2008–2011	2018	
3	Brandon Roy	2002–2006	2009	
22	Detlef Schrempf	1981–1985	2026	
25	Bob Houbregs	1950–1953	1953	

=== National awards ===
==== Player of the Year ====
- 1953 – Bob Houbregs (Helms Athletic Foundation)

==== All-America Team ====
- 1953 – Bob Houbregs (Consensus All-American)

=== Conference awards ===
Washington's conference award recipients as of 2019.

==== Coach of the Year ====
- 1982 – Marv Harshman
- 1984 – Marv Harshman
- 1996 – Bob Bender
- 2005 – Lorenzo Romar
- 2009 – Lorenzo Romar
- 2012 – Lorenzo Romar
- 2018 – Mike Hopkins
- 2019 – Mike Hopkins

==== Freshman of the Year ====
- 1984 – Christian Welp
- 1988 – Mike Hayward
- 1992 – Mark Pope
- 2009 – Isaiah Thomas
- 2012 – Tony Wroten Jr.

==== Defensive Player of the Year ====
- 2018 – Matisse Thybulle
- 2019 – Matisse Thybulle

==== Conference Player of the Year ====
- 1986 – Christian Welp
- 2006 – Brandon Roy
- 2019 – Jaylen Nowell

=== All-Century Team ===
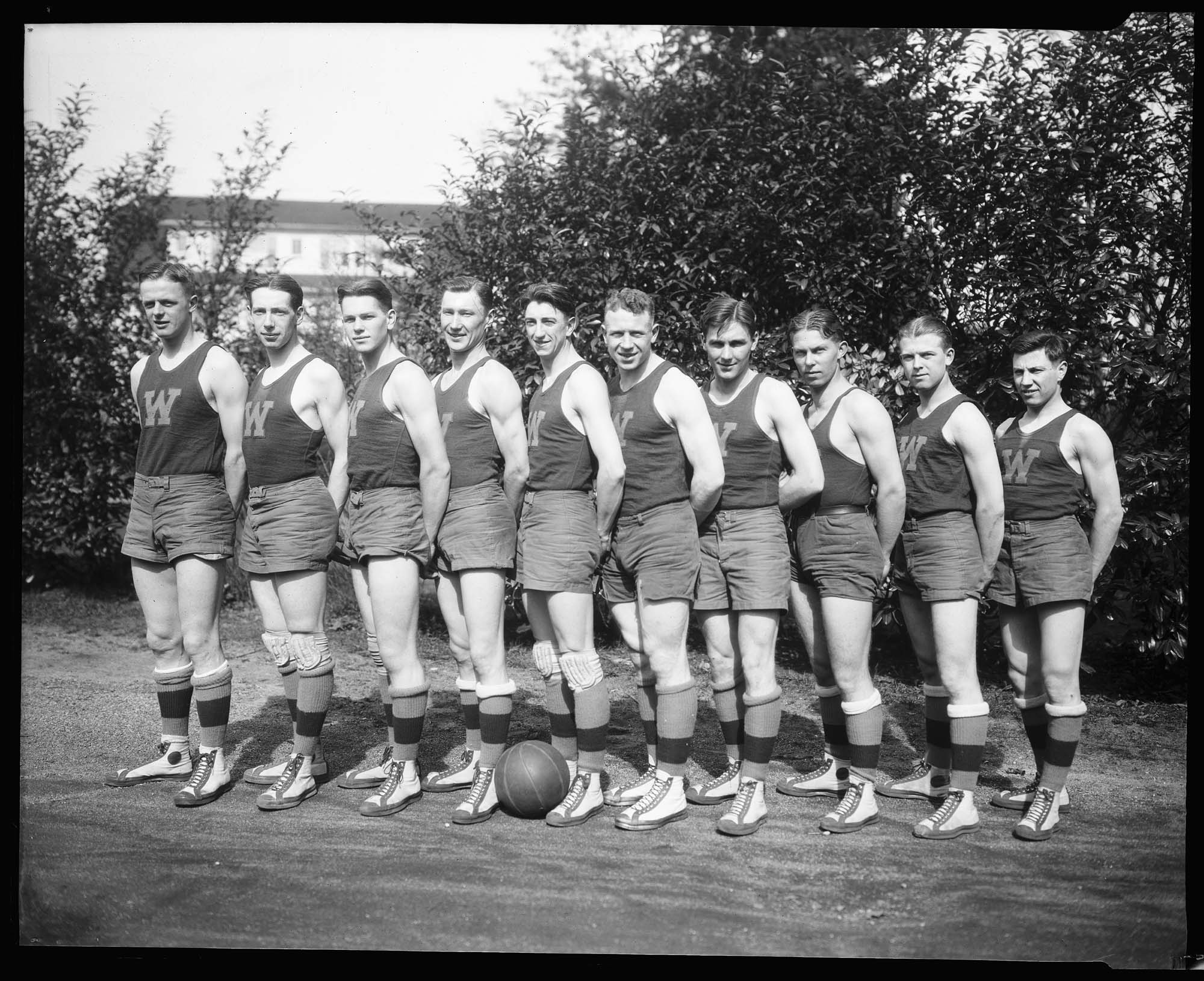
1923 Washington basketball team

Washington's All-Century basketball team was selected by a fan vote in 2002. Husky fans filled out ballots while attending games at Bank of America Arena or voted via the school's web site. Schrempf received the most votes, followed by Todd MacCulloch and Bob Houbregs.

- Center Bruno Boin (1956–1957, 1959)
- Guard Chester Dorsey (1974–1977)
- Center James Edwards (1974–1977)
- Center Steve Hawes (1970–1972)
- Center Bob Houbregs (1951–1953)
- Forward George Irvine (1968–1970)
- Center Todd MacCulloch (1996–1999)
- Center Jack Nichols (1944, 1947–1948)
- Guard Eldridge Recasner (1987–1990)
- Forward Mark Sanford (1994–1997)
- Forward Detlef Schrempf (1982–1985)
- Center Christian Welp (1984–1987)

== Former Huskies and NBA players ==
- Ralph Bishop (1933–1936) – competed in the 1936 Summer Olympics, winning the gold medal.
- Jon Brockman (2005–2009) – Drafted 38th overall in the 2009 NBA draft by the Portland Trail Blazers. Played 3 seasons in the NBA (2009–2012) plus four seasons overseas.
- Marquese Chriss (2015–2016) – Drafted 8th overall in the 2016 NBA draft by the Sacramento Kings and traded on draft night to the Phoenix Suns. As of March 2022, Chriss plays for the Dallas Mavericks.
- Will Conroy (2001–2005) – Played professionally from 2005 to 2014. Current associate head coach at UW.
- Justin Dentmon, professional basketball player, 2010 top scorer in the Israel Basketball Premier League
- Charles Dudley (1970–1972) – averaged 5.3 points per game and won an NBA Championship with Golden State in 1975.
- James Edwards (1973–1977) – He retired with 14,862 career points and 6,004 career rebounds, 3x NBA Champion (1989, 1990, 1996)
- Markelle Fultz (2016–2017) – Drafted 1st overall in the 2017 NBA draft by the Philadelphia 76ers.
- Abdul Gaddy (born 1992), basketball player in the Israeli Basketball Premier League
- Pétur Guðmundsson (1977–1980) – Drafted 61st overall in the 1981 NBA draft by the Portland Trail Blazers.
- Lars Hansen (1972–1976) – 1x NBA Champion (1979), 2006 inductee to the Canada Basketball Hall Of Fame.
- Bill Hanson (1959–1962) – first Husky to lead the conference in rebounding.
- Spencer Hawes (2006–2007) – Drafted 10th overall in the 2007 NBA Draft. Played 10 seasons in the NBA (2007–2017). As of March 2020, he plays for the South Bay Lakers.
- Steve Hawes (1969–1972) – Drafted 24th in the 1972 NBA Draft. Played 10 seasons in the NBA (1974–84) plus three seasons overseas.
- Justin Holiday (2007–2011) – Undrafted in the 2011 NBA Draft, 1x NBA Champion (2015), As of March 2023, Holiday plays for the Dallas Mavericks
- Bob Houbregs (1950–1953) – career scoring average was 9.3 points per game, and he was elected to the Naismith Memorial Basketball Hall of Fame in 1987. In 2000, he was inducted into the Canadian Basketball Hall of Fame.
- Grant Leep (1999–2002) – Head men's basketball coach at Seattle Pacific University.
- Todd MacCulloch (1995–1999) – played four seasons in the NBA before retiring due to Charcot-Marie-Tooth disease.
- Jaden McDaniels (2019–2020) – drafted 28th overall in the 2020 NBA draft by the Los Angeles Lakers.
- Dejounte Murray (2015–2016) – drafted 29th overall in the 2016 NBA draft by the San Antonio Spurs.
- Jack Nichols (1943–1944, 1946–1948) – He scored 5,245 points in his career and was a contributor to the Celtics' 1957 NBA Championship team.
- Louie Nelson (1970–1973) – drafted 19th overall in the 1973 draft, played 7 years in the NBA.
- Jaylen Nowell (2017–2019) – drafted 43rd overall in the 2019 NBA draft by the Minnesota Timberwolves.
- Quincy Pondexter (2006–2010) – drafted 26th overall in the 2010 NBA Draft, last played for the San Antonio Spurs in 2019.
- Eldridge Recasner (1987–1990) – played professionally from 1990 to 2002. Played in NBA with Denver (94–95), Houston (95–96), Atlanta (96–98), Charlotte (98–01), LA Clippers (01–02).
- Nate Robinson (2002–2005) – 2006, 2009, 2010 NBA Slam Dunk Contest winner, last played for Homenetmen Beirut B.C.
- Lorenzo Romar (1978–1980) – played five years in the NBA with Golden State, Milwaukee and Detroit. Head coach of the Huskies from 2002 to 2017
- Terrence Ross (2010–2012) – drafted 8th overall in the 2012 NBA draft by the Toronto Raptors. 2013 NBA Slam Dunk Contest winner.
- Brandon Roy (2002–2006) – 2007 NBA Rookie of the Year, 3x NBA All-Star. His NBA career ended in 2012 due to knee injuries. He played with the Portland Trail Blazers from 2006 to 2011 and the Minnesota Timberwolves in 2012.
- Mark Sanford (1994–1997) – 31st pick by the Miami Heat in the 1997 NBA Draft playing 3 years in the NBA. Sanford was the fastest freshman to score 500 points in school history doing so in only 32 games.
- Detlef Schrempf (1981–1985) – 3x NBA All-Star and 2x NBA Sixth Man of the Year.
- Tre Simmons (2003–2005) – played professionally from 2005 until 2018. Current assistant coach for the Oregon Ducks women's basketball team.
- Isaiah Stewart (2019–2020) – drafted 16th overall by the Portland Trail Blazers in the 2020 NBA draft, plays for the Detroit Pistons
- Isaiah Thomas (2008–2011) – drafted 60th overall in the 2011 NBA Draft, Thomas was an All Star in 2016 and 2017. As of December 2021, he most recently played for the Los Angeles Lakers.
- Christian Welp (1983–1987) – 1984 Pac-10 Freshman of the Year who became the Huskies all-time leading scorer and later entered the NBA.
- C.J. Wilcox (2010–2014) – drafted 28th overall in the 2014 NBA draft by the Los Angeles Clippers.
- Tony Wroten (2011–2012) – drafted 25th overall in the 2012 NBA draft by the Memphis Grizzlies. Wroten last played for Club Joventut Badalona
- Phil Zevenbergen (1985–1987) – played with the San Antonio Spurs for one season.
- Matisse Thybulle (2015–2019) – drafted 20th overall in the 2019 NBA draft, he plays for the Portland Trail Blazers.

== In popular culture ==
The Huskies men's basketball team appears in the 1997 film The 6th Man with a fictional roster, of including the film's main characters, the brothers Kenny (Marlon Wayans) and Antoine Tyler (Kadeem Hardison). Much of the film was shot on location in Hec-Ed and around the actual campus.
