= 2004–05 UCLA Bruins men's basketball team =

American college basketball season

2004–05 UCLA Bruins men's basketball

NCAA tournament, Round of 64
- Conference: Pacific-10
- Record: 18–11 (11–7 Pac-10)
- Head coach: Ben Howland (2nd season)
- Assistant coaches: Donny Daniels; Ernie Zeigler; Kerry Keating
- Home arena: Pauley Pavilion

2004–05 Pacific-10 Conference men's basketball standings
	Conf.				Overall
Team	W		L	PCT	W		L	PCT
No. 9 Arizona	15	–	3	.833	30	–	7	.811
Washington†	14	–	4	.778	29	–	6	.829
No. 18 UCLA ^{1}	11	–	7	.611	18	–	11	.621
Stanford	11	–	7	.611	18	–	13	.581
Oregon State	8	–	10	.444	17	–	15	.531
Arizona State ^{1}	7	–	11	.389	18	–	14	.563
Washington State	7	–	11	.389	12	–	16	.429
Oregon ^{1}	6	–	12	.333	14	–	13	.519
California	6	–	12	.333	13	–	16	.448
USC	5	–	13	.278	12	–	17	.414
† Conference tournament winner As of April 8, 2005; Rankings from Coaches Poll^{1} Holds tie-breaker

The 2004–05 UCLA Bruins men's basketball team represented the University of California, Los Angeles in the 2004–05 NCAA Division I men's basketball season. UCLA entered the Pacific-10 conference tournament with a regular season conference record of 11–7. After losing in the first round, their final conference record was 11–8 (7 wins more than the previous season). The team reached the round of 64 in the NCAA tournament, losing to the Texas Tech Red Raiders.

== Roster ==
2004–05 UCLA Bruins men's basketball team
Players
Coaches

Pos.	#	Name	Height	Weight	Year	Hometown
G	4	Arron Afflalo	6 ft 5 in (1.96 m)	—	Fr	Los Angeles, California
G	11	Jordan Farmar	6 ft 2 in (1.88 m)	—	Fr
C	45	Michael Fey	7 ft 0 in (2.13 m)	—	Jr
G	55	Quinn Hawking	6 ft 3 in (1.91 m)	—	Jr
C	15	Ryan Hollins	7 ft 0 in (2.13 m)	—	Jr	Pasadena, California
F	54	Josiah Johnson	6 ft 8 in (2.03 m)	—	Sr
C	14	Lorenzo Mata	6 ft 9 in (2.06 m)	—	Fr
F	25	Matt McKinney	6 ft 8 in (2.03 m)	—	So
G	3	Brian Morrison	6 ft 2 in (1.88 m)	—	Sr
G	55	DeAndre Robinson	6 ft 5 in (1.96 m)	—	Fr
G	2	Janou Rubin	6 ft 3 in (1.91 m)	—	Sr
G/F	3	Josh Shipp	6 ft 5 in (1.96 m)	220 lb (100 kg)	Fr	Los Angeles, California
G	1	Dijon Thompson (C)	6 ft 7 in (2.01 m)	193 lb (88 kg)	Sr	Los Angeles, California
G	22	Ike Williams	6 ft 1 in (1.85 m)	—	Jr

Head coach

Ben Howland (Weber State)

Assistant coach(es)

- Donny Daniels (Cal State Fullerton)
- Ernie Zeigler (Northwood)
- Kerry Keating (Seton Hall)

Legend

- (C) Team captain
- (S) Suspended
- (I) Ineligible
- (W) Walk-on
- Injured
- Current redshirt

== Schedule ==
Date time, TV	Rank^{#}	Opponent^{#}	Result	Record	Site city, state
Exhibition
November 5, 2004		Simon Fraser; Exhibition	W 97–48	0–0	Pauley Pavilion; Los Angeles, CA
November 11, 2004		Monterrey Tech; Exhibition	W 80–48	0–0	Pauley Pavilion; Los Angeles, CA
Regular Season
November 20, 2004; FSN West 2		Chicago State	W 64–53	1–0	Pauley Pavilion (6,833); Los Angeles, CA
November 23, 2004; FSN West 2		Western Illinois	W 75–60	2–0	Pauley Pavilion (5,033); Los Angeles, CA
November 27, 2004; FSN West 2		UC Irvine	W 76–65	3–0	Pauley Pavilion (6,247); Los Angeles, CA
November 30, 2004; FSN West 2		Long Beach State	W 75–62	4–0	Pauley Pavilion (6,211); Los Angeles, CA
December 5, 2004; KCAL-TV		vs. Boston College; John R. Wooden Classic	L 64–74	4–1	Arrowhead Pond of Anaheim (14,027); Anaheim, CA
December 11, 2004; FSN West 2		Pepperdine	W 85–83	5–1	Pauley Pavilion (6,695); Los Angeles, CA
December 18, 2004; CBS		Michigan	W 81–79	6–1	Pauley Pavilion (10,782); Los Angeles, CA
December 21, 2004; ESPN		at No. 23 Michigan State	L 64–76	6–2	Breslin Student Events Center (14,759); East Lansing, MI
December 31, 2004		at Oregon State	L 80–85	6–3 (0–1)	Gill Coliseum (9,042); Corvallis, OR
January 2, 2005		at Oregon	W 70–62	7–3 (1–1)	McArthur Court (9,087); Eugene, OR
January 6, 2005		Washington State	W 80–77 ^{2OT}	8–3 (2–1)	Pauley Pavilion (9,255); Los Angeles, CA
January 8, 2005; FSN West 2		No. 12 Washington	W 95–86	9–3 (3–1)	Pauley Pavilion (11,970); Los Angeles, CA
January 13, 2005; FSN		at Arizona State	W 86–82	10–3 (4–1)	Wells Fargo Arena (9,850); Tempe, AZ
January 15, 2005; ABC		at No. 17 Arizona	L 73–76	10–4 (4–2)	McKale Center (14,559); Tucson, AZ
January 20, 2005; FSN West 2		Stanford	L 64–75	10–5 (4–3)	Pauley Pavilion (8,255); Los Angeles, CA
January 22, 2005; CBS		California	L 51–64	10–6 (4–4)	Pauley Pavilion (11,451); Los Angeles, CA
January 29, 2005; FSN		at USC	W 72–69	11–6 (5–4)	Los Angeles Memorial Sports Arena (7,767); Los Angeles, CA
February 3, 2005; FSN		at Washington State	W 58–56 ^{OT}	12–6 (6–4)	Beasley Coliseum (5,168); Pullman, WA
February 5, 2005; FSN		at No. 13 Washington	L 70–82	12–7 (6–5)	Hec Edmundson Pavilion (10,000); Seattle, WA
February 10, 2005		Arizona State	W 95–76	13–7 (7–5)	Pauley Pavilion (7,227); Los Angeles, CA
February 12, 2005; FSN		No. 12 Arizona	L 73–83	13–8 (7–6)	Pauley Pavilion (12,681); Los Angeles, CA
February 17, 2005; FSN		at California	W 77–62	14–8 (8–6)	Haas Pavilion (9,271); Berkeley, CA
February 20, 2005; CBS		at Stanford	L 65–78	14–9 (8–7)	Maples Pavilion (7,233); Stanford, CA
February 24, 2005; FSN West 2		USC	W 90–69	15–9 (9–7)	Pauley Pavilion (12,823); Los Angeles, CA
February 27, 2005; CBS		at Notre Dame	W 75–65	16–9	Edmund P. Joyce Center (11,418); Notre Dame, IN
March 03, 2005; FSN West 2		Oregon State	W 69–61	17–9 (10–7)	Pauley Pavilion (10,947); Los Angeles, CA
March 05, 2005; FSN		Oregon	W 73–61	18–9 (11–7)	Pauley Pavilion (11,789); Los Angeles, CA
Pac-10 Tournament
March 10, 2005; FSN		Oregon State; Quarterfinals	L 72–79	18–10 (11–7)	Staples Center (14,014); Los Angeles, CA
NCAA tournament
March 17, 2005; CBS		vs. No. 24 Texas Tech; First Round	L 66–78	18–11	McKale Center (13,751); Tucson, AZ
*Non-conference game. ^{#}Rankings from AP Poll. (#) Tournament seedings in parentheses. All times are in Pacific Time.
