= 2008 Pacific-10 Conference men's basketball tournament =

Basketball tournament

- Classification: Division I
- Season: 2007–08
- Teams: 10
- Site: Staples Center; Los Angeles, California
- Champions: UCLA (3rd title)
- Winning coach: Ben Howland (2nd title)
- MVP: Darren Collison (UCLA)
- Attendance: 81,809 (5 sessions); 18,672 (Final)
- Top scorer: Brook Lopez (Stanford) (65 points)

2007–08 Pacific-10 Conference men's basketball standings
	Conf.				Overall
Team	W		L	PCT	W		L	PCT
No. 2 UCLA†	16	–	2	.889	35	–	4	.897
No. 11 Stanford	13	–	5	.722	28	–	8	.778
No. 21 Washington State	11	–	7	.611	26	–	9	.743
Arizona State	9	–	9	.500	21	–	13	.618
Oregon	9	–	9	.500	18	–	14	.563
Arizona	8	–	10	.444	19	–	15	.559
Washington	7	–	11	.389	16	–	17	.485
California	6	–	12	.333	17	–	16	.515
Oregon State	0	–	18	.000	6	–	25	.194
USC*	0	–	7	.000	0	–	12	.000
† Conference tournament winner As of April 5, 2008; Rankings from AP Poll; *USC vacated 11 conference and 21 overall wins, due to NCAA rules violations.

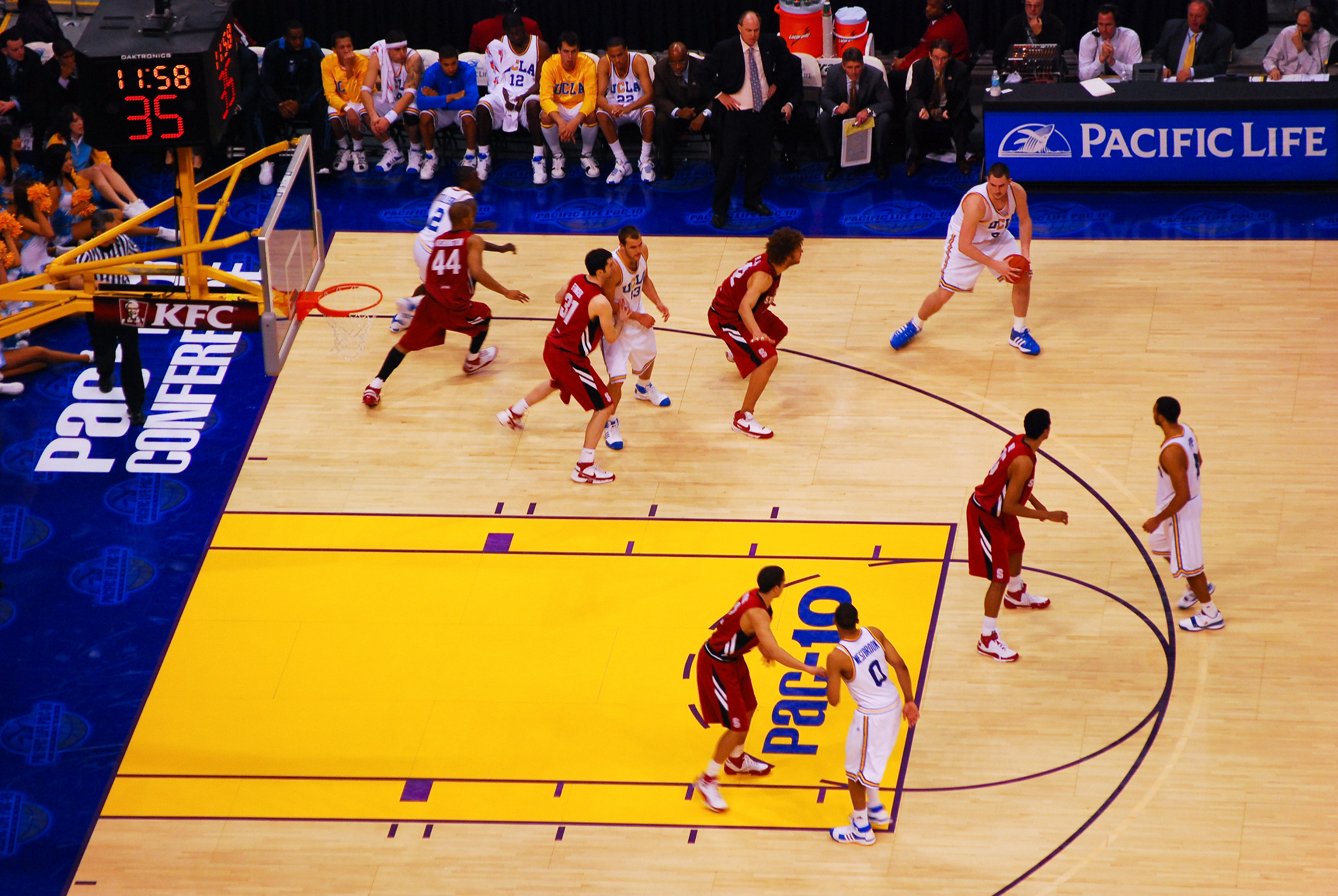
UCLA's Kevin Love on the perimeter at Pac-10 Championship game against Stanford at Staples Center, Los Angeles, 2008. Ben Howland and the UCLA bench looks on from the sideline.

The 2008 Pacific Life Pacific-10 Conference men's basketball tournament was held between March 12 and March 15, 2008, at Staples Center in Los Angeles. All ten schools in the conference qualified for the tournament. Number one seed UCLA defeated number two seed Stanford 67–64 to win the conference tournament. It was the first time since 2005 that the top two seeded teams were in the final game. UCLA was the regular season champion. A record crowd of 18,997 (Staples Center capacity for Basketball) was on hand to watch UCLA defeat USC 57–54 in the semi-finals. On January 3, 2010, USC Athletic Director Mike Garrett announced that the school was to vacate the 2007–08 season's victories for NCAA violations by the basketball team.

== Seeds ==
All Pacific-10 schools played in the tournament. Teams were seeded by conference record, with a tiebreaker system used to seed teams with identical conference records.

Seed	School	Conference (Overall)	Tiebreaker
1	UCLA	16–2 (28–3)	
2	Stanford	13–5 (24–6)	
3	Washington State	11–7 (23–7)	2–0 vs. USC
4	USC	11–7 (25–7)	0-2 vs. WSU
5	Arizona State	9–9 (19–11)	2–0 vs. Oregon
6	Oregon	9–9 (18–12)	0–2 vs. ASU
7	Arizona	8–10 (18–13)	
8	Washington	7–11 (16–15)	
9	California	6–12 (15–14)	
10	Oregon State	0–18 (6–24)	

== Bracket ==
Play-in Round; March 12
8	Washington	81
9	California	84
7	Arizona	87
10	Oregon State	56

Quarterfinals; March 13
1	#3 UCLA	88
9	California	66
4	USC*	59*
5	Arizona State	55
3	#21 Washington State	75
6	Oregon	70
2	#11 Stanford	75
7	Arizona	64

Semifinals; March 14
1	#3 UCLA	57
4	USC	54
3	#21 Washington State	68
2	#11 Stanford	75

Final; March 15
1	#3 UCLA	67
2	#11 Stanford	64

* Denotes a vacated win, as the result of a January 3, 2010 announcement that USC has vacated all wins during the 2007–2008 season, including its Pac-10 Conference tournament victory over Arizona State (therefore, USC finished the season with a record of 0–12).

== All-Tournament Team ==
- O. J. Mayo, USC
- Kyle Weaver, Washington State
- Brook Lopez, Stanford
- Russell Westbrook, UCLA
- Kevin Love, UCLA

== Most Outstanding Player ==
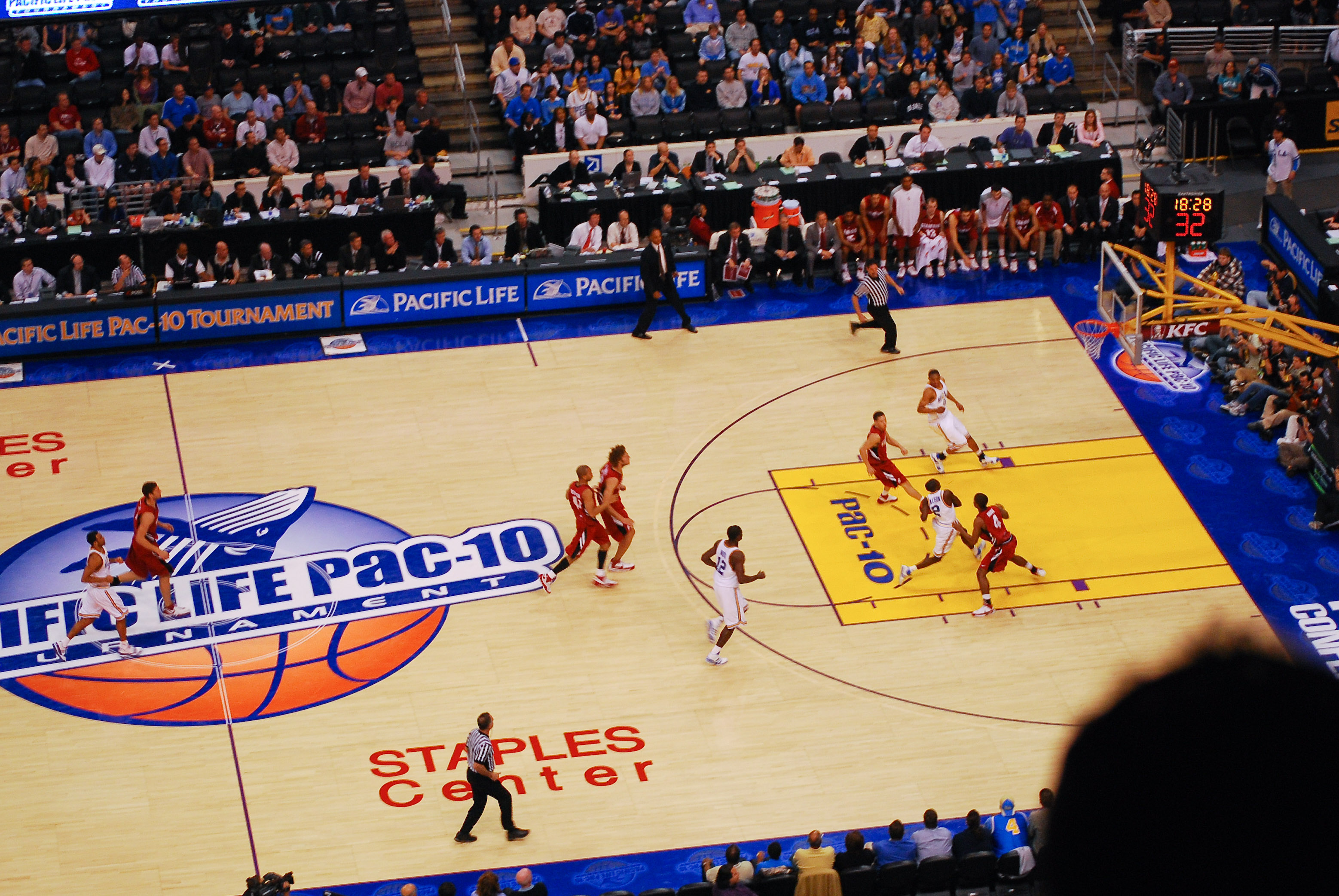
Collison at the 2008 Pac-10 Championship game

- Darren Collison, UCLA

== Aftermath & notes ==
- Arch rivals UCLA and USC met for the first time in 225 games in post-season play. The teams had split in the regular season, with the Trojans winning at Pauley Pavilion and the Bruins winning at Galen Center. In their third matchup of the season, a capacity crowd of 18,997 at the Staples Center saw UCLA beat USC 57–54 in the tournament semi-finals. Both teams had highly regarded freshmen: Kevin Love and O. J. Mayo.
- This was the fourth match up between any arch-rival pairs in Pac-10 history, with only the two Oregon schools yet to meet.
- Arizona set a record for most points in a half (1st) for any Pac-10/12 Tournament game with 59 (vs. OSU (21) on Mar. 12, 2008.
- Brook Lopez of Stanford had an individual tournament record 60 field goal attempts (25 made in 3 games) which still stands.
- Nine Pacific-10 teams were invited to Post season play. UCLA, Stanford, Washington State, USC, Arizona, and Oregon were invited to the 2008 NCAA Division I men's basketball tournament. UCLA was the number one seed in the West Regional bracket. Arizona State and California were invited to the 2008 National Invitation Tournament. Washington was invited to the 2008 College Basketball Invitational.
