= 2005 Pacific-10 Conference men's basketball tournament =

- Classification: Division I
- Season: 2004–05
- Teams: 8
- Site: Staples Center; Los Angeles, California
- Champions: Washington (1st title)
- Winning coach: Lorenzo Romar (1st title)
- MVP: Salim Stoudamire (Arizona)
- Attendance: 62,147

2004–05 Pacific-10 Conference men's basketball standings
	Conf.				Overall
Team	W		L	PCT	W		L	PCT
No. 9 Arizona	15	–	3	.833	30	–	7	.811
Washington†	14	–	4	.778	29	–	6	.829
No. 18 UCLA ^{1}	11	–	7	.611	18	–	11	.621
Stanford	11	–	7	.611	18	–	13	.581
Oregon State	8	–	10	.444	17	–	15	.531
Arizona State ^{1}	7	–	11	.389	18	–	14	.563
Washington State	7	–	11	.389	12	–	16	.429
Oregon ^{1}	6	–	12	.333	14	–	13	.519
California	6	–	12	.333	13	–	16	.448
USC	5	–	13	.278	12	–	17	.414
† Conference tournament winner As of April 8, 2005; Rankings from Coaches Poll^{1} Holds tie-breaker

The 2005 Pacific Life Pacific-10 Conference men's basketball tournament was played between March 10 and March 12, 2005, at Staples Center in Los Angeles, California. The champion of the tournament was Washington, which received the Pac-10's automatic bid to the NCAA tournament. The Most Outstanding Player was Salim Stoudamire of Arizona.

== Seeds ==
The top eight Pacific-10 schools play in the tournament. Teams are seeded by conference record, with a tiebreaker system used to seed teams with identical conference records.

Seed	School	Conference (Overall)
1	Arizona	15–3 (25–5)
2	Washington	14–4 (24–5)
3	UCLA	11–7 (18–9)
4	Stanford	11–7 (17–11)
5	Oregon State	8–10 (16–13)
6	Arizona State	7–11 (18–12)
7	Washington State	7–11 (12–15)
8	California	6–12 (13–15)

== Bracket ==
First Round (March 10)
1	#8 Arizona	88
8	California	63
4	UCLA	72
5	Oregon State	79
3	Stanford	60
6	Washington State	58
2	#14 Washington	95*
7	Arizona State	90

Semifinals (March 11)
1	#8 Arizona	90
5	Oregon State	59
3	Stanford	63
2	#14 Washington	66

Final (March 12)
1	#8 Arizona	72
2	#14 Washington	81

== Tournament Notes ==
- Arizona's 31-point victory margin (90-59) over Oregon State in the 2nd round was the largest for any game in this tournament's history. It has since been broken, but still remains the second largest margin.
- This is the first and time only time in Pac-12 Tournament history that the 2 seed beat the 1 seed (as of 2013 these seeds have met 5 times).
- Like the previous two years, no universities met their arch-rival in this year's tournament.
- Three universities each had two players on the all-tournament team, which is the only time this has happened.
- There were no blocked shots in the game between Washington and Arizona, although this has happened in other tournaments.

== All tournament team ==
- Salim Stoudamire, Arizona – Tournament MVP
- Channing Frye, Arizona
- Matt Haryasz, Stanford
- Chris Hernandez, Stanford
- Nate Robinson, Washington
- Tre Simmons, Washington
