= 2004–05 Washington Huskies men's basketball team =

American college basketball season

2004–05 Washington Huskies men's basketball

Pac-10 Tournament Champions Great Alaska Shootout Champions

NCAA tournament, Sweet Sixteen
- Conference: Pacific-10 Conference

Ranking
- Coaches: No. 9
- AP: No. 8
- Record: 29–6 (14–4 Pac-10)
- Head coach: Lorenzo Romar
- Assistant coaches: Cameron Dollar; Ken Bone; Jim Shaw
- Home arena: Bank of America Arena

2004–05 Pacific-10 Conference men's basketball standings
	Conf.				Overall
Team	W		L	PCT	W		L	PCT
No. 9 Arizona	15	–	3	.833	30	–	7	.811
Washington†	14	–	4	.778	29	–	6	.829
No. 18 UCLA ^{1}	11	–	7	.611	18	–	11	.621
Stanford	11	–	7	.611	18	–	13	.581
Oregon State	8	–	10	.444	17	–	15	.531
Arizona State ^{1}	7	–	11	.389	18	–	14	.563
Washington State	7	–	11	.389	12	–	16	.429
Oregon ^{1}	6	–	12	.333	14	–	13	.519
California	6	–	12	.333	13	–	16	.448
USC	5	–	13	.278	12	–	17	.414
† Conference tournament winner As of April 8, 2005; Rankings from Coaches Poll^{1} Holds tie-breaker

The 2004–05 Washington Huskies men's basketball team represented the University of Washington in the 2004–05 NCAA Division I men's basketball season. This was head coach Lorenzo Romar's third season at Washington. The Huskies played their home games at Bank of America Arena and were members of the Pacific-10 Conference. They finished the season 29–6, 14–4 in Pac-10 play, and they captured the Pac–10 Tournament title and an automatic bid to the 2005 NCAA Division I men's basketball tournament. They earned the No. 1 seed in the West Region, defeating Montana in the first round and Pacific in the second round before losing to Louisville in the Sweet Sixteen.

== 2004–05 team ==
=== Roster ===
#	Name	Height	Weight (lbs.)	Position	Class	Hometown	Previous team(s)
0	Ryan Appleby	6'3"	165	PG	So.*	Stanwood, WA	Stanwood High School
1	Tre Simmons	6'5"	195	SG	Sr.	Seattle, WA	Garfield High School
2	Nate Robinson	5'9"	180	PG	Jr.	Seattle, WA	Rainier Beach High School
3	Brandon Roy	6'6"	215	SG	Jr.	Seattle, WA	Garfield High School
4	Hakeem Rollins	6'7"	200	C	Sr.	Mesa, AZ	Mesa High School
5	Will Conroy	6'2"	190	PG	Sr.	Seattle, WA	Garfield High School
11	Brandon Burmeister	6'4"	190	G	So.	Mercer Island, WA	Mercer Island High School
15	Bobby Jones	6'6"	210	SF	Jr.	Long Beach, CA	Polytechnic High School
21	Matt Fletcher	6'7"	200	G	Sr.	Maize, KS	Maize High School
22	Hans Gasser	6'9"	225	F	So.	Issaquah, WA	Issaquah High School
24	Jamaal Williams	6'6"	225	F	Jr.*	Corona, CA	Centennial High School
32	Zane Potter	6'6"	185	F	Jr.	Gresham, OR	Sam Barlow High School
42	Mike Jensen	6'8"	240	PF	Sr.*	Kent, WA	Kentwood High School
52	Alex Johnson	6'3"	185	G	Sr.	Bellevue, WA	Eastside Catholic High School
RS	Joel Smith	6'4"	205	G	So.	Wolfeboro, NH	Brewster Academy
RS	Zach Johnson	6'8"	275	C	Fr.*	Sacramento, CA	Natomas High School

=== Coaching staff ===
Name	Position	Year at Washington	Alma mater (year)
Lorenzo Romar	Head coach	7th	Washington (1980)
Raphael Chillious	Assistant coach	1st	Lafayette (1996)
Paul Fortier	Assistant coach	4th	Washington (2003)
Jim Shaw	Assistant coach	5th	Western Oregon State (1985)
Lance LaVetter	Director of basketball Ooerations	7th	Northern Arizona (1992)

== 2004–05 schedule and results ==
Date time, TV	Rank^{#}	Opponent^{#}	Result	Record	Site (attendance) city, state
Exhibition
11/09/2004*; 7:00 pm		Westmont	W 92–52	–	Bank of America Arena (N/A); Seattle, WA
Regular season
11/19/2004*; 7:30 pm	No. 22	Seattle Pacific	W 89–71	1–0	Bank of America Arena (9,851); Seattle, WA
11/25/2004*; 6:00 pm, ESPN2	No. 22	vs. Utah; Great Alaska Shootout Quarterfinals	W 78–71	2–0	Sullivan Arena (6,667); Anchorage, AK
11/26/2004*; 8:00 pm, ESPN2	No. 22	vs. Oklahoma; Great Alaska Shootout Semifinals	W 96–91	3–0	Sullivan Arena (7,765); Anchorage, AK
11/27/2004*; 6:00 pm, ESPN2	No. 22	vs. No. 19 Alabama; Great Alaska Shootout championship	W 79–76	4–0	Sullivan Arena (8,264); Anchorage, AK
12/01/2004*; 5:00 pm, FSNNW	No. 14	at Gonzaga	L 87–99	4–1	McCarthey Athletic Center (6,000); Spokane, WA
12/05/2004*; 1:00 pm	No. 14	Eastern Washington	W 89–56	5–1	Bank of America Arena (9,418); Seattle, WA
12/07/2004*; 7:00 pm	No. 16	San Diego State	W 98–69	6–1	Bank of America Arena (9,694); Seattle, WA
12/12/2004*; 12:30 pm	No. 16	at Loyola Marymount	W 100–93	7–1	Gersten Pavilion (2,006); Los Angeles, CA
12/19/2004*; 5:00 pm, FSN	No. 18	No. 12 NC State	W 68–64	8–1	Bank of America Arena (10,000); Seattle, WA
12/22/2004*; 7:00 pm	No. 12	Sacred Heart	W 114–53	9–1	Bank of America Arena (9,585); Seattle, WA
12/24/2004*; 1:00 pm	No. 12	Houston	W 110–63	10–1	Bank of America Arena (9,653); Seattle, WA
12/31/2004; 1:30 pm, FSN	No. 13	California	W 81–67	11–1 (1–0)	Bank of America Arena (10,000); Seattle, WA
01/02/2005; 12:30 pm, FSNNW	No. 13	Stanford	W 76–73	12–1 (2–0)	Bank of America Arena (10,000); Seattle, WA
01/06/2005; 7:30 pm	No. 12	at USC	W 84–59	13–1 (3–0)	Galen Center (2,633); Los Angeles, CA
01/08/2005; 7:30 pm	No. 12	at UCLA	L 86–95	13–2 (3–1)	Pauley Pavilion (11,970); Los Angeles, CA
01/13/2005; 7:00 pm	No. 14	Oregon	W 77–56	14–2 (4–1)	Bank of America Arena (10,000); Seattle, WA
01/15/2005; 7:00 pm, FSNNW	No. 14	Oregon State	W 108–68	15–2 (5–1)	Bank of America Arena (10,000); Seattle, WA
01/23/2005; 1:00 pm, FSN	No. 10	Washington State	W 66–48	16–2 (6–1)	Bank of America Arena (10,000); Seattle, WA
01/27/2005; 5:30 pm, FSN	No. 10	at No. 11 Arizona	L 82–91	16–3 (6–2)	McKale Center (14,597); Tucson, AZ
01/30/2005; 12:45 pm, CBS	No. 10	at Arizona State	W 79–70	17–3 (7–2)	Wells Fargo Arena (9,434); Tempe, AZ
02/03/2005; 7:00 pm	No. 13	USC	W 99–69	18–3 (8–2)	Bank of America Arena (10,000); Seattle, WA
02/05/2005; 2:00 pm, FSN	No. 13	UCLA	W 82–70	19–3 (9–2)	Bank of America Arena (10,000); Seattle, WA
02/10/2005; 7:30 pm, FSN	No. 11	at Oregon	W 95–88 ^{OT}	20–3 (10–2)	McArthur Court (9,087); Eugene, OR
02/13/2005; 1:00 pm, FSN	No. 11	at Oregon State	L 73–90	20–4 (10–3)	Gill Coliseum (9,696); Corvallis, OR
02/19/2005; 4:00 pm, FSNNW	No. 15	at Washington State	W 68–55	21–4 (11–3)	Beasley Coliseum (8,633); Pullman, WA
02/24/2005; 4:00 pm, FSN	No. 14	Arizona State	W 90–82	22–4 (12–3)	Bank of America Arena (10,000); Seattle, WA
02/26/2005; 1:00 pm, FSN	No. 14	No. 9 Arizona	W 93–85	23–4 (13–3)	Bank of America Arena (10,000); Seattle, WA
03/03/2005; 7:30 pm, FSN	No. 10	at California	W 106–63	24–4 (14–3)	Haas Pavilion (9,380); Berkeley, CA
03/05/2005; 1:00 pm, CBS	No. 10	at Stanford	L 77–87	24–5 (14–4)	Maples Pavilion (9,380); Stanford, CA
Pac-10 men's tournament
03/10/2005*; 6:00 pm, FSN	No. 8	vs. Arizona State; Quarterfinals	W 95–90 ^{OT}	25–5	Staples Center (N/A); Los Angeles, CA
03/11/2005*; 8:30 pm, FSN	No. 8	vs. Stanford; Semifinals	W 66–63	26–5	Staples Center (15,068); Los Angeles, CA
03/12/2005*; 3:00 pm, CBS	No. 8	vs. No. 9 Arizona; Championship Game	W 81–72	27–5	Staples Center (18,672); Los Angeles, CA
NCAA men's tournament
03/17/2005*; 12:10 pm, CBS		vs. Montana; First Round	W 88–77	28–5	Taco Bell Arena (11,871); Boise, ID
03/19/2005*; 12:10 pm, CBS		vs. Pacific; Second Round	W 97–79	29–5	Taco Bell Arena (11,871); Boise, ID
03/24/2005*; 4:10 pm, CBS		vs. Louisville; Sweet Sixteen	L 79–93	29–6	University Arena (15,792); Albuquerque, NM
*Non-conference game. ^{#}Rankings from AP Poll. (#) Tournament seedings in parentheses. All times are in Pacific Time (#) during NCAA Tournament is seed with Region.
