= Salim Stoudamire =

American basketball player (born 1982)

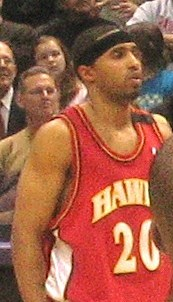
- Stoudamire with the Atlanta Hawks in 2006

Personal information
- Born: October 11, 1982 (age 44) Portland, Oregon, U.S.
- Listed height: 6 ft 1 in (1.85 m)
- Listed weight: 190 lb (86 kg)

Career information
- High school: Lincoln (Portland, Oregon); Lake Oswego (Lake Oswego, Oregon)
- College: Arizona (2001–2005)
- NBA draft: 2005: 2nd round, 31st overall pick
- Drafted by: Atlanta Hawks
- Playing career: 2005–2013
- Position: Point guard
- Number: 20

Career history
- 2005–2008: Atlanta Hawks
- 2010: Idaho Stampede
- 2011: Reno Bighorns
- 2013: Guaros de Lara

Career highlights
- Consensus second-team All-American (2005); First-team All-Pac-10 (2005); Pac-10 Freshman of the Year (2002); Pac-10 tournament MVP (2005)
- Stats at NBA.com
- Stats at Basketball Reference

Charles Salim Stoudamire (born October 11, 1982) is an American former professional basketball player.

Stoudamire was selected by the Atlanta Hawks in the second round (31st overall pick) of the 2005 NBA draft.

== Early life and college ==
Stoudamire graduated from Lake Oswego High School in Lake Oswego, Oregon as a member of the class of 2001. He also attended Lincoln High School in Portland during his freshman year.

At the University of Arizona, Stoudamire led the Wildcats to an Elite Eight appearance in 2005. Stoudamire hit a fadeaway shot with less than two seconds on the clock to beat Oklahoma State University in the Sweet 16. In his Arizona career, the guard made 342 three-point field goals. He ranks second in Arizona history in career three-point field goal percentage (45.8%, behind Steve Kerr's 57.3%).

- With the University of Arizona Wildcats, in the 2004–05 season, Stoudamire was an AP Second Team All-American.
- In 2004–05, Stoudamire led the NCAA in 3-point percentage, averaging .504.

== Professional career ==
Stoudamire was drafted by the Atlanta Hawks with the 31st overall pick in the 2005 NBA draft. Stoudamire played three seasons with the Hawks. On March 24, 2007, he scored a career-high 37 points during a 102–100 overtime loss to the Portland Trail Blazers. He spent the 2008 preseason with the San Antonio Spurs and 2009 preseason with the Milwaukee Bucks.

On November 1, 2010, Stoudamire was acquired by the Idaho Stampede; he was later waived on December 30. On January 5, 2011, he was acquired by the Reno Bighorns.

On November 1, 2013, Stoudamire was acquired by the Fort Wayne Mad Ants. Stoudamire was later waived by the Mad Ants on November 12.

In 2018, Stoudamire was drafted to The 3 Headed Monsters team on Ice Cube's Big 3 tournament, which aired on Fox on June 21, 2018, and continued until the championship in Brooklyn, NY on August 24, 2018.

== Personal life ==
Stoudamire is the cousin of former NBA players Damon Stoudamire and Terrence Jones, and current NBA player Grant Williams.

In 2006, after the end of the NBA season, Stoudamire announced his intentions to eat vegan. After initially monitoring his health daily, team staff accepted that the new diet had not caused weight loss.

== Career statistics ==
Legend
GP	Games played	GS	Games started	MPG	Minutes per game
FG%	Field goal percentage	3P%	3-point field goal percentage	FT%	Free throw percentage
RPG	Rebounds per game	APG	Assists per game	SPG	Steals per game
BPG	Blocks per game	PPG	Points per game	**Bold**	Career high

=== NBA ===
==== Regular season ====
Year	Team	GP	GS	MPG	FG%	3P%	FT%	RPG	APG	SPG	BPG	PPG
2005–06	Atlanta	**61**	**1**	**20.3**	.415	**.380**	**.900**	**1.9**	**1.2**	**.4**	.0	**9.7**
2006–07	Atlanta	**61**	0	17.0	**.416**	.361	.897	1.2	1.0	.3	.0	7.7
2007–08	Atlanta	35	0	11.5	.361	.341	.820	.7	.8	.2	**.1**	5.7
Career		157	1	17.0	.407	.366	.882	1.4	1.0	.4	.1	8.0

==== Playoffs ====
Year	Team	GP	GS	MPG	FG%	3P%	FT%	RPG	APG	SPG	BPG	PPG
2008	Atlanta	3	0	9.3	.444	.333	1.000	.3	.0	.3	.0	4.0
Career		3	0	9.3	.444	.333	1.000	.3	.0	.3	.0	4.0

=== College ===
*	Led NCAA Division I

Year	Team	GP	GS	MPG	FG%	3P%	FT%	RPG	APG	SPG	BPG	PPG
2001–02	Arizona	34	28	30.0	.443	.453	.904	2.1	1.1	**.8**	–	12.8
2002–03	Arizona	30	27	25.8	.473	.444	.864	1.6	1.8	.6	**.1**	13.0
2003–04	Arizona	29	29	**32.0**	.452	.415	.795	**2.7**	**3.0**	**.8**	**.1**	16.3
2004–05	Arizona	**36**	**33**	31.3	**.504**	**.504***	**.910**	2.3	2.2	**.8**	**.1**	**18.4**
Career		129	117	29.8	.471	.458	.870	2.2	2.0	.8	.1	15.2
