= Lorenzo Romar =

American basketball player and coach (born 1958)

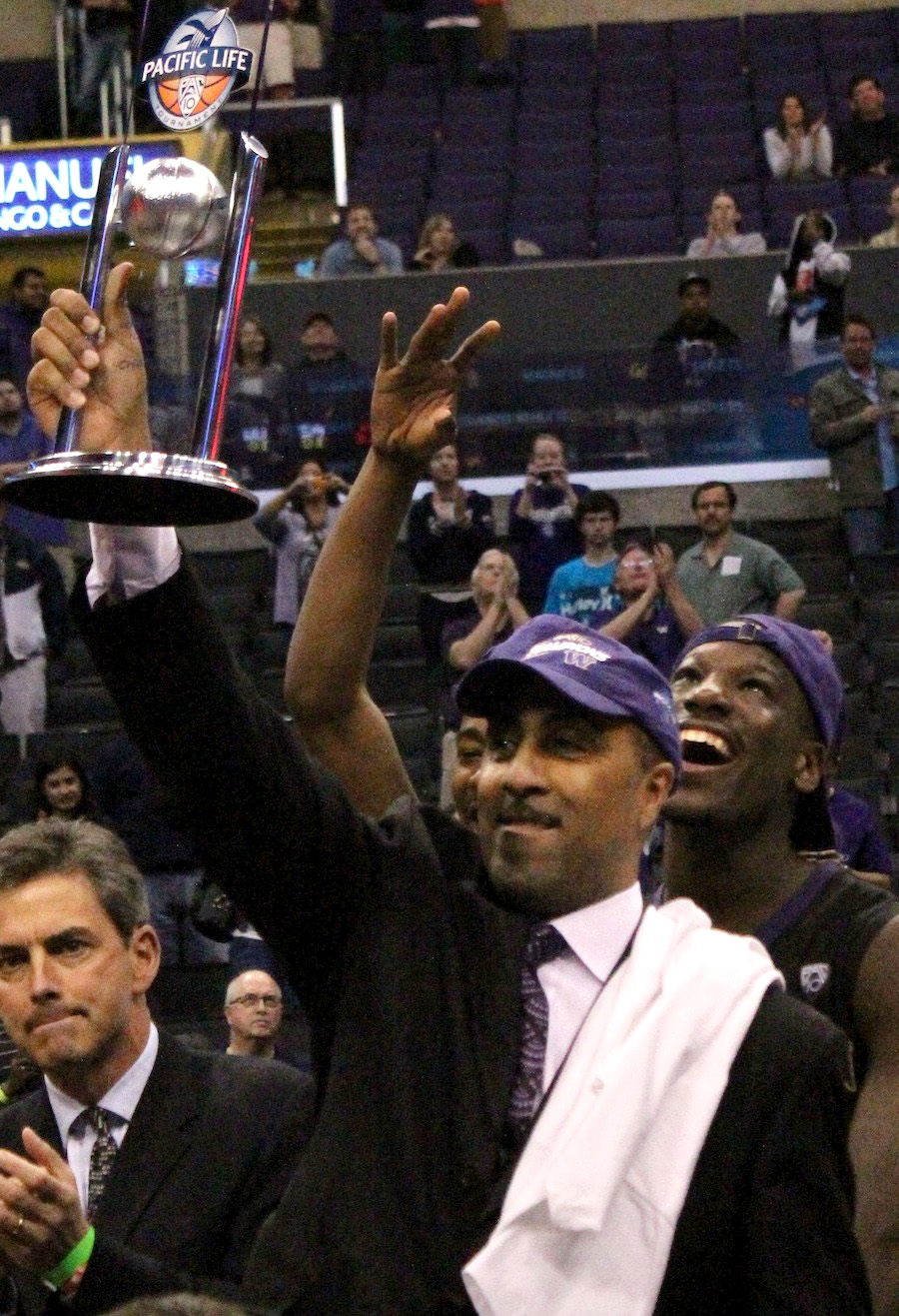
- Romar celebrates Washington's 2011 Pac-10 tournament championship.

Loyola Marymount Lions
- Title: Assistant coach
- Conference: West Coast Conference

Personal information
- Born: November 13, 1958 (age 68) South Gate, California, U.S.
- Listed height: 6 ft 1 in (1.85 m)
- Listed weight: 171 lb (78 kg)

Career information
- High school: Saint Pius X (Downey, California)
- College: Cerritos College (1976–1978); Washington (1978–1980)
- NBA draft: 1980: 7th round, 141st overall pick
- Drafted by: Golden State Warriors
- Playing career: 1980–1985
- Position: Point guard
- Number: 18, 5, 14
- Coaching career: 1992–present

Career history

Playing
- 1980–1983: Golden State Warriors
- 1983–1984: Milwaukee Bucks
- 1984: Detroit Pistons
- 1984: Tampa Bay Thrillers
- 1984–1985: Evansville Thunder

Coaching
- 1992–1996: UCLA (assistant)
- 1996–1999: Pepperdine
- 1999–2002: Saint Louis
- 2002–2017: Washington
- 2017–2018: Arizona (associate HC)
- 2018–2024: Pepperdine
- 2024–present: Loyola Marymount (assistant)

Career highlights
- As player: CBA All-Star (1985); As coach: CBI champion (2021); C-USA tournament champion (2000); 2× Pac-10/12 regular season champion (2009, 2012); 3× Pac-10 tournament champion (2005, 2010, 2011); 3× Pac-10/12 Coach of the Year (2005, 2009, 2012)
- Stats at NBA.com
- Stats at Basketball Reference

Lorenzo Romar (born November 13, 1958) is an American basketball coach and former player. He currently serves as an assistant coach for the Loyola Marymount Lions, a position he has held since 2024. He previously was the head men's basketball coach at Pepperdine University, a position he held from 1996 to 1999 and resumed from 2018 to 2024. Romar also served as the head men's basketball coach at Saint Louis University from 1999 to 2002 and the University of Washington from 2002 to 2017.

== Playing career ==
Romar played college basketball at Cerritos College from 1976 to 1978 and then for Washington from 1978 to 1980. After college, he was drafted by the Golden State Warriors and spent five years playing in the National Basketball Association (NBA). Following his NBA career, Romar finished the 1984–85 season in the Continental Basketball Association (CBA) with the Tampa Bay Thrillers and Evansville Thunder. He averaged 6.3 points and 3.7 assists and was named a CBA All-Star in his lone season in the league.

== Coaching career ==
=== Early years ===
After the NBA, Romar played and coached for Athletes in Action. Romar was then hired as an assistant coach at the University of California, Los Angeles (UCLA) under head coach Jim Harrick from 1992 to 1996, and was credited with recruiting many of the players on the 1995 national championship team. Romar became the head coach at Pepperdine University and then at Saint Louis University before taking the job at Washington in 2002.

=== Washington ===
Romar was credited with turning around the University of Washington basketball program and generating new enthusiasm for the program. In 2004, Washington qualified for the NCAA tournament for the first time in five years. In 2005, Washington won the Pac-10 tournament and received a No. 1 seed in the NCAA tournament. The Huskies made their way to the Sweet Sixteen for the first time since 1998, but were ousted by Louisville. In 2006, Washington earned a third consecutive NCAA tournament appearance and advanced to the Sweet Sixteen for the second consecutive year.

After failing to make the NCAA Tournament the next two years, Romar was named Pac-10 Coach of the Year for leading the Huskies to their first outright conference title since 1953. They earned a No. 4 seed in the NCAA tournament, but lost in the Second Round. The Huskies returned to the Sweet Sixteen the following year, but again lost. In 2011, the Huskies earned their third consecutive trip to the NCAA tournament. The trip marked the Huskies' last trip to the Tournament under Romar.

With a season-opening win over South Carolina State on November 14, 2014, Romar passed Marv Harshman to become the second-winningest coach in UW history.

After four years of near .500 seasons and five years without an NCAA Tournament appearance, Romar recruited his long-time friend Michael Porter Sr. to join the Huskies as an assistant coach in 2016. Michael Porter Sr. was expected to bring his two sons, Michael Porter Jr. and Jontay Porter, as commits to Washington. Michael Porter Jr. was widely considered the No. 1 recruit in the 2017 class. However, on March 15, 2017, following a dismal 9–22 season with future #1 pick Markelle Fultz leading the team, Romar was fired as head coach at Washington after 15 years. Romar ended his tenure at Washington with a record of 298–195. He made six NCAA Tournaments and three NITs, but had not made the NCAA Tournament in six straight years prior to his firing.

=== Arizona assistant coach ===
On April 16, 2017, it was announced that Romar had joined Sean Miller's staff at Arizona as associate head coach. On February 24, 2018, Romar was the interim head coach for one game after news broke the previous day that the FBI had reportedly intercepted phone conversations about Miller talking about paying Deandre Ayton to come to Arizona. Ayton would be the second straight #1 pick to be coached by Romar for at least one game.

=== Pepperdine (second stint) ===
Romar was announced as the new head men's basketball coach at Pepperdine on March 12, 2018, returning for his second stint with the school. On March 24, 2021, Romar's Waves beat Coastal Carolina 84–61 to win the 2021 College Basketball Invitational, securing the program's first-ever postseason championship. Romar was fired on March 4, 2024.

=== Loyola Marymount ===
On March 19, 2024, it was announced that Romar had joined Stan Johnson's staff at Loyola Marymount as an assistant coach.

== Coaching style ==
Romar is known by his fellow coaches as one of the top basketball recruiters in the country. Additionally, he is respected as a genuine and optimistic person and was once voted "the opposing coach players would most like to play for" in a Pac-10 poll. In March 2006, Romar was given the prestigious Coach Wooden "Keys to Life" award for outstanding character.

== Personal life ==
Romar is married to Leona Romar, with whom he has three daughters—Terra, Tavia and Taylor. In 2006, he and his wife founded the Lorenzo Romar Foundation for the prevention of domestic violence and educational assistance for disadvantaged youth as well as other charitable causes.

== Head coaching record ==
Record table
| Season | Team | Overall | Conference | Standing | Postseason |
|---|---|---|---|---|---|
Pepperdine Waves (West Coast Conference) (1996–1999)
| 1996–97 | Pepperdine | 6–21 | 4–10 | T–6th | |
| 1997–98 | Pepperdine | 17–10 | 9–5 | 2nd | |
| 1998–99 | Pepperdine | 19–13 | 9–5 | T–2nd | NIT First Round |
Saint Louis Billikens (Conference USA) (1999–2002)
| 1999–00 | Saint Louis | 19–14 | 7–9 | T–7th | NCAA Division I First Round |
| 2000–01 | Saint Louis | 17–14 | 8–8 | 7th | |
| 2001–02 | Saint Louis | 15–16 | 9–7 | 5th | |
| Saint Louis: | | 51–44 (.537) | 24–24 (.500) | | |
Washington Huskies (Pacific-10/Pac-12 Conference) (2002–2017)
| 2002–03 | Washington | 10–17 | 5–13 | 9th | |
| 2003–04 | Washington | 19–12 | 12–6 | 2nd | NCAA Division I First Round |
| 2004–05 | Washington | 29–6 | 14–4 | 2nd | NCAA Division I Sweet 16 |
| 2005–06 | Washington | 26–7 | 13–5 | 2nd | NCAA Division I Sweet 16 |
| 2006–07 | Washington | 19–13 | 8–10 | 7th | |
| 2007–08 | Washington | 16–17 | 7–11 | 8th | CBI First Round |
| 2008–09 | Washington | 26–9 | 14–4 | 1st | NCAA Division I Second Round |
| 2009–10 | Washington | 26–10 | 11–7 | 3rd | NCAA Division I Sweet 16 |
| 2010–11 | Washington | 24–11 | 11–7 | 3rd | NCAA Division I Second Round |
| 2011–12 | Washington | 24–11 | 14–4 | 1st | NIT Semifinals |
| 2012–13 | Washington | 18–16 | 9–9 | T–6th | NIT First Round |
| 2013–14 | Washington | 17–15 | 9–9 | T–8th | |
| 2014–15 | Washington | 16–15 | 5–13 | 11th | |
| 2015–16 | Washington | 19–15 | 9–9 | T–6th | NIT Second Round |
| 2016–17 | Washington | 9–22 | 2–16 | 11th | |
| Washington: | | 298–195 (.604) | 143–127 (.530) | | |
Pepperdine Waves (West Coast Conference) (2018–2024)
| 2018–19 | Pepperdine | 16–18 | 6–10 | 8th | |
| 2019–20 | Pepperdine | 16–16 | 8–8 | 6th | |
| 2020–21 | Pepperdine | 15–12 | 7–6 | 4th | CBI Champion |
| 2021–22 | Pepperdine | 7–25 | 1–15 | 10th | |
| 2022–23 | Pepperdine | 9–21 | 2–14 | 10th | |
| 2023–24 | Pepperdine | 13–20 | 5–11 | T–6th | |
| Pepperdine: | | 118–157 (.429) | 51–84 (.378) | | |
| Total: | | 467–397 (.541) | | | |
National champion Postseason invitational champion Conference regular season champion Conference regular season and conference tournament champion Division regular season champion Division regular season and conference tournament champion Conference tournament champion

== Awards and honors ==
- NCAA champion (1995, as assistant coach)
- John Wooden "Keys to Life" Award (2006)
- Pac-10/12 John R. Wooden Coach of the Year (2005, 2009, 2012)

=== Career statistics ===
==== NBA ====
===== Regular season =====
| Year | Team | GP | GS | MPG | FG% | 3P% | FT% | RPG | APG | SPG | BPG | PPG |
|---|---|---|---|---|---|---|---|---|---|---|---|---|
| 1980–81 | Golden State | 53 | – | 13.7 | .412 | .333 | .683 | 1.1 | 2.6 | 0.5 | 0.1 | 4.1 |
| 1981–82 | Golden State | 79 | 11 | 15.9 | .504 | .200 | .823 | 1.2 | 2.9 | 0.8 | 0.2 | 6.2 |
| 1982–83 | Golden State | 82 | 64 | 26.0 | .465 | .303 | .743 | 1.7 | 5.5 | 1.2 | 0.1 | 7.6 |
| 1983–84 | Golden State | 3 | 0 | 5.0 | .400 | .000 | .500 | 0.3 | 0.3 | 0.0 | 0.0 | 2.0 |
| 1983–84 | Milwaukee | 65 | 9 | 15.5 | .460 | .125 | .722 | 1.4 | 3.0 | 0.8 | 0.1 | 6.0 |
| 1984–85 | Milwaukee | 4 | 0 | 4.0 | .125 | .000 | .000 | 0.0 | 0.5 | 0.0 | 0.0 | 0.5 |
| 1984–85 | Detroit | 5 | 0 | 7.0 | .250 | .000 | 1.000 | 0.0 | 2.0 | 0.8 | 0.0 | 1.8 |
| Career | | 291 | 84 | 17.8 | .464 | .211 | .749 | 1.3 | 3.5 | 0.8 | 0.1 | 5.9 |

===== Playoffs =====
| Year | Team | GP | GS | MPG | FG% | 3P% | FT% | RPG | APG | SPG | BPG | PPG |
|---|---|---|---|---|---|---|---|---|---|---|---|---|
| 1983–84 | Milwaukee | 13 | – | 5.2 | .450 | .000 | .636 | 0.2 | 1.2 | 0.0 | 0.0 | 1.9 |
| Career | | 13 | – | 5.2 | .450 | .000 | .636 | 0.2 | 1.2 | 0.0 | 0.0 | 1.9 |

==== College ====
| Year | Team | GP | GS | MPG | FG% | 3P% | FT% | RPG | APG | SPG | BPG | PPG |
|---|---|---|---|---|---|---|---|---|---|---|---|---|
| 1978–79 | Washington | 27 | – | 19.8 | .508 | – | .721 | 1.4 | – | – | – | 6.0 |
| 1979–80 | Washington | 28 | – | 26.9 | .489 | – | .763 | 1.9 | 3.5 | 1.0 | 0.1 | 9.3 |
| Career | | 55 | – | 23.4 | .496 | – | .745 | 1.6 | 3.5 | 1.0 | 0.1 | 7.7 |
