= 2004–05 UTEP Miners men's basketball team =

American college basketball season

2004–05 UTEP Miners men's basketball

WAC tournament champions

NCAA tournament
- Conference: Western Athletic Conference
- Record: 27–8 (14–4 WAC)
- Head coach: Doc Sadler (1st season)
- Home arena: Don Haskins Center

2004–05 WAC men's basketball standings
	Conf.				Overall
Team	W		L	PCT	W		L	PCT
Nevada	16	–	2	.889	25	–	7	.781
UTEP †	14	–	4	.778	27	–	8	.771
Rice	12	–	6	.667	19	–	12	.613
Fresno State	9	–	9	.500	16	–	14	.533
Louisiana Tech	9	–	9	.500	14	–	15	.483
SMU	9	–	9	.500	14	–	14	.500
Hawaii	7	–	11	.389	16	–	13	.552
Boise State	6	–	12	.333	16	–	18	.471
Tulsa	5	–	13	.278	9	–	20	.310
San Jose State	3	–	15	.167	6	–	23	.207
† 2005 WAC tournament winner

The 2004–05 UTEP Miners men's basketball team represented the University of Texas at El Paso as a member of the Western Athletic Conference during the 2004–05 college basketball season. The team was led by second-year head coach Doc Sadler and played their home games at the Don Haskins Center in El Paso, Texas.

== Roster ==
2004–05 UTEP Miners men's basketball team
Players
Coaches

Pos.	#	Name	Height	Weight	Year	Hometown
F	1	Jason Williams	6 ft 6 in (1.98 m)	210 lb (95 kg)	Jr	New Orleans, Louisiana
G	21	Filiberto Rivera	6 ft 2 in (1.88 m)	175 lb (79 kg)	Sr	Carolina, Puerto Rico
F	33	Omar Thomas	6 ft 5 in (1.96 m)	205 lb (93 kg)	Sr	Philadelphia, Pennsylvania
C	40	John Tofi	6 ft 10 in (2.08 m)	250 lb (113 kg)	Jr	San Francisco, California

Head coach

- Doc Sadler

Assistant coach(es)

Legend

- (C) Team captain
- (S) Suspended
- (I) Ineligible
- (W) Walk-on
- Injured
- Current redshirt

== Schedule and results ==
Date time, TV	Rank^{#}	Opponent^{#}	Result	Record	Site city, state
Regular Season
Nov 21, 2004*		Delaware State	W 83–50	1–0	Don Haskins Center; El Paso, Texas
Nov 23, 2004*		Jackson State	W 83–57	2–0	Don Haskins Center; El Paso, Texas
Nov 26, 2004*		vs. Arizona State	W 66–65	3–0	Valley High School; Las Vegas, Nevada
Nov 27, 2004*		vs. Southern Illinois	L 62–68	3–1	Valley High School; Las Vegas, Nevada
Nov 30, 2004*		Purdue-Fort Wayne	W 67–58	4–1	Don Haskins Center; El Paso, Texas
Dec 4, 2004*		Texas Tech	L 57–72	4–2	Don Haskins Center; El Paso, Texas
Dec 12, 2004*		Oklahoma Panhandle State	W 69–44	5–2	Don Haskins Center; El Paso, Texas
Dec 15, 2004*		at New Mexico State	W 75–64	6–2	Pan American Center; Las Cruces, New Mexico
Dec 18, 2004*		New Mexico State	W 79–61	7–2	Don Haskins Center; El Paso, Texas
Dec 21, 2004*		Occidental	W 72–46	8–2	Don Haskins Center; El Paso, Texas
Dec 27, 2004*		Alabama State	W 89–57	9–2	Don Haskins Center; El Paso, Texas
Dec 28, 2004*		Princeton	W 68–42	10–2	Don Haskins Center; El Paso, Texas
Jan 1, 2005		at Boise State	W 91–77	11–2 (1–0)	Taco Bell Arena; Boise, Idaho
Jan 6, 2005		Rice	W 96–67	12–2 (2–0)	Don Haskins Center; El Paso, Texas
Jan 8, 2005		Tulsa	W 105–70	13–2 (3–0)	Don Haskins Center; El Paso, Texas
Jan 12, 2005		at Nevada	W 83–80 ^{OT}	14–2 (4–0)	Lawlor Events Center; Reno, Nevada
Jan 15, 2005		at Fresno State	L 63–66	14–3 (4–1)	Save Mart Center; Fresno, California
Jan 20, 2005*		Hawaii	W 71–70	15–3 (5–1)	Don Haskins Center; El Paso, Texas
Jan 22, 2005		San Jose State	W 69–65	16–3 (6–1)	Don Haskins Center; El Paso, Texas
Jan 27, 2005		at SMU	W 60–55	17–3 (7–1)	Moody Coliseum; Dallas, Texas
Jan 29, 2005		at Louisiana Tech	L 65–80	17–4 (7–2)	Thomas Assembly Center; Ruston, Louisiana
Feb 3, 2005		at Tulsa	L 54–65	17–5 (7–3)	Donald W. Reynolds Center; Tulsa, Oklahoma
WAC tournament
Mar 10, 2005*		vs. Hawaii; Quarterfinals	W 80–62	25–7	Lawlor Events Center; Reno, Nevada
Mar 11, 2005*		vs. Rice; Semifinals	W 85–77	26–7	Lawlor Events Center; Reno, Nevada
Mar 12, 2005*		vs. Boise State; Championship game	W 91–78	27–7	Lawlor Events Center; Reno, Nevada
NCAA tournament
Mar 17, 2005*	(11 ATL)	vs. (6 ATL) No. 18 Utah; First round	L 54–60	27–8	McKale Center; Tucson, Arizona
*Non-conference game. ^{#}Rankings from AP Poll. (#) Tournament seedings in parentheses. ATL=Atlanta.
