= Doc Sadler =

American basketball coach

Current position
- Title: Special advisor
- Team: Kansas
- Conference: Big 12

Biographical details
- Born: June 12, 1960 (age 66); Greenwood, Arkansas, U.S.
- Education: Arkansas

Coaching career (HC unless noted)
- 1982–1985: Arkansas (assistant)
- 1985–1986: Lamar (assistant)
- 1986: Houston (assistant)
- 1986–1987: County Line HS (AR)
- 1987–1988: Chicago State (assistant)
- 1988–1991: Arkansas–Fort Smith (assistant)
- 1991–1994: Texas Tech (assistant)
- 1994–1997: Arizona State (assistant)
- 1997–1998: Arkansas–Fort Smith (assistant)
- 1998–2003: Arkansas–Fort Smith
- 2003–2004: UTEP (assistant)
- 2004–2006: UTEP
- 2006–2012: Nebraska
- 2012–2013: Kansas (director of basketball operations)
- 2013–2014: Iowa State (assistant)
- 2014–2019: Southern Miss
- 2019–2022: Nebraska (assistant)
- 2022–2023: Oklahoma (special advisor)
- 2023–present: Kansas (special advisor)

Administrative career (AD unless noted)
- 1998–2003: Arkansas–Fort Smith

Head coaching record
- Overall: 205–201 (college); 38–7(high school)

Accomplishments and honors

Championships
- WAC tournament (2005)

Kenneth Lee "Doc" Sadler (born June 12, 1960) is an American college basketball coach. He was the head men's basketball coach at the University of Southern Mississippi (Southern Miss), a position he held from 2014 through the 2018-19 season. Sadler served as the head men's basketball coach at the University of Texas at El Paso (UTEP) from 2004 to 2006 and the University of Nebraska–Lincoln from 2006 to 2012.

== Biography ==
=== Early life ===
Sadler was born and raised in Greenwood, Arkansas.

=== Playing career ===
Sadler received his undergraduate degree from the University of Arkansas, where he was a student manager under legendary coach Eddie Sutton.

=== Coaching career ===
Sadler's coaching career started as an assistant with a string of schools before landing a head coaching job at Arkansas–Fort Smith (then known as Westark Community College) and then at University of Texas at El Paso, where he took over for former Texas Tech Red Raiders head coach Billy Gillispie after previously serving as his assistant coach. At UTEP, Sadler led his team to a 48–18 record and two postseason appearances in his 2 seasons at the helm. He departed UTEP for the head coaching job at the University of Nebraska–Lincoln on August 8, 2006 to take over for former coach Barry Collier, who left to become the athletic director at Butler University.

At Nebraska, Sadler inherited a team that had been relegated to the back of the pack in the Big 12 Conference for several seasons, after former coach Danny Nee led the team to five NCAA tournament appearances, an NIT title and a Big Eight tournament title in the 1990s. Sadler failed to find much success in Lincoln, and aside from a victory over then-11th-ranked Indiana, the team again often fell to the bottom of the standings following Nebraska's move to the Big Ten Conference in 2011. He was fired on March 9, 2012 after six seasons without ever making an NCAA tournament appearance.

On June 13, 2012, Kansas basketball coach, Bill Self announced the hiring of Sadler to replace Barry Hinson as Director of Basketball Operations. Sadler left Kansas for Iowa State on May 31, 2013 when Sadler was hired to serve as an assistant under Fred Hoiberg. During the 2013-14 season in Ames, Sadler was part of a staff that won 28 games and reached the NCAA Tournament Sweet 16. On May 1, 2014, Sadler was named head coach at Southern Miss. In his five years at the helm, Southern Miss overcame NCAA sanctions related to the previous staff to lead his team to 20 wins and a postseason appearance in 2018-19.

On April 11, 2019, Sadler resigned his position as head coach at Southern Miss and returned to Nebraska as an assistant coach, once again under Hoiberg. On March 18, 2022, Hoiberg announced that Sadler was no longer with the Nebraska program as he had restructured his staff.

On November 17, 2022, it was announced that Sadler had joined the Oklahoma Sooners men's basketball program as a special advisor to head coach Porter Moser.

== Head coaching record ==
=== College ===
Record table
Season	Team	Overall	Conference	Standing	Postseason
UTEP Miners (Western Athletic Conference) (2004–2005)
2004–05	UTEP	27–8	14–4	2nd	NCAA Division I First Round
UTEP Miners (Conference USA) (2005–2006)
2005–06	UTEP	21–10	11–3	3rd	NIT First Round
UTEP:		48–18 (.727)	25–7 (.781)		
Nebraska Cornhuskers (Big 12 Conference) (2006–2010)
2006–07	Nebraska	17–14	6–10	7th	
2007–08	Nebraska	20–13	7–9	T–7th	NIT Second Round
2008–09	Nebraska	18–13	8–8	8th	NIT First Round
2009–10	Nebraska	15–18	2–14	12th	
2010–11	Nebraska	19–13	7–9	T–7th	NIT First Round
Nebraska Cornhuskers (Big Ten Conference) (2011–2012)
2011–12	Nebraska	12–18	4–14	T–11th	
Nebraska:		101–89 (.532)	34–64 (.347)		
Southern Miss Golden Eagles (Conference USA) (2014–2019)
2014–15	Southern Miss	3–20 (Note: In 2016, the NCAA vacated six wins from the 2014–15 season due to participation of academically ineligible players.)	3–14	13th	
2015–16	Southern Miss	8–21	5–13	T–12th	
2016–17	Southern Miss	9–22	6–12	T–11th	
2017–18	Southern Miss	16–18	7–11	T–9th	
2018–19	Southern Miss	20–13	11–7	T–2nd	CBI First Round
Southern Miss:		56–94 (.373)	32–57 (.360)		
Total:		205–201 (.505)			
National champion Postseason invitational champion Conference regular season champion Conference regular season and conference tournament champion Division regular season champion Division regular season and conference tournament champion Conference tournament champion
