= 2005 NCAA Division I men's basketball tournament =

Edition of USA college basketball tournament

- Season: 2004–05
- Teams: 65
- Finals site: Edward Jones Dome, St. Louis, Missouri
- Champions: North Carolina Tar Heels (4th title, 8th title game, 16th Final Four)
- Runner-up: Illinois Fighting Illini (1st title game, 5th Final Four)
- Semifinalists: Louisville Cardinals (8th Final Four); Michigan State Spartans (6th Final Four)
- Winning coach: Roy Williams (1st title)
- MOP: Sean May (North Carolina)
- Attendance: 47,262

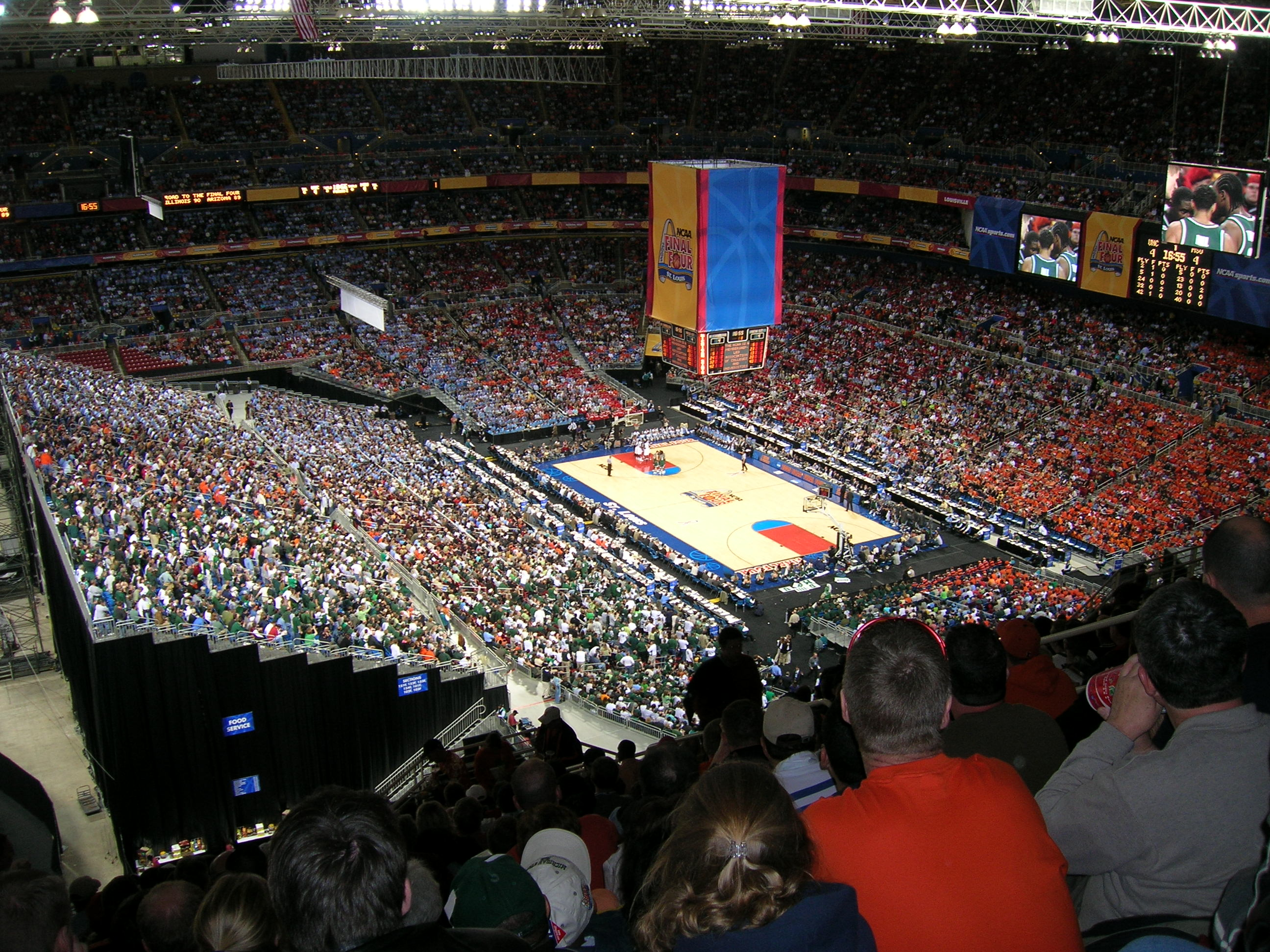
2005 Final Four, Edward Jones Dome

The 2005 NCAA Division I men's basketball tournament involved 65 schools playing in single-elimination play to determine the national champion of men's NCAA Division I college basketball. The 67th annual edition of the tournament began on March 15, 2005, and ended with the championship game on April 4 at the Edward Jones Dome in St. Louis.

The Final Four consisted of top seed Illinois, in their first Final Four appearance since 1989, Louisville, making their first appearance since winning the national championship in 1986, North Carolina, reaching their first Final Four since their 2000 Cinderella run, and Michigan State, back in the Final Four for the first time since 2001.

North Carolina emerged as the national champion for a fourth time, defeating Illinois in the final 75–70. North Carolina's Sean May was named the tournament's Most Outstanding Player. It was coach Roy Williams's first national championship.

For the first time since 1999, when Weber State defeated North Carolina, a #14 seed defeated a #3 seed when Bucknell upset Kansas. A #13 seed, Vermont, advanced by defeating Syracuse in the first round and a #12 seed, Wisconsin-Milwaukee, advanced to the Sweet Sixteen in the Chicago region.

== Tournament procedure ==
A total of 65 teams entered the tournament, thirty having earned automatic bids by winning their conference tournaments. The automatic bid of the Ivy League, which does not conduct a postseason tournament, went to its regular season champion. The remaining 34 teams were granted "at-large" bids, which are extended by the NCAA Selection Committee.

Two teams play an opening-round game, popularly called the "play-in game," the winner of which advances to the main draw of the tournament and plays a top seed in one of the regionals. Since its inception in 2001, this game has been played at the University of Dayton Arena in Dayton, Ohio.

All 64 teams were seeded 1 to 16 within their regionals; the winner of the play-in game automatically received a 16 seed. The Selection Committee seeded the entire field from 1 to 65.

The 2005 regionals, along with their top seeds, are listed below.

- Chicago Regional (top seed: Illinois; top overall seed)
- Albuquerque Regional (top seed: Washington; fourth overall seed)
- Syracuse Regional (top seed: North Carolina; second overall seed)
- Austin Regional (top seed: Duke; third overall seed)

Each regional winner advanced to the Final Four, held April 2–4 in St. Louis.

== Schedule and venues ==
2005 play-in game (orange) and first and second rounds (green)
2005 Regionals (blue) and Final Four (red)

Sites hosting each round of the 2005 tournament:

Opening round

- March 15
  - University of Dayton Arena, Dayton, Ohio (Host: University of Dayton)

First and second rounds

- March 17 and 19
  - McKale Center, Tucson, Arizona (Host: University of Arizona)
  - RCA Dome, Indianapolis, Indiana (Hosts: Butler University, Horizon League)
  - Taco Bell Arena, Boise, Idaho (Host: Boise State University)
  - Wolstein Center, Cleveland, Ohio (Host: Cleveland State University)
- March 18 and 20
  - Charlotte Coliseum, Charlotte, North Carolina (Host: Davidson College)
  - DCU Center, Worcester, Massachusetts (Host: College of the Holy Cross)
  - Ford Center, Oklahoma City, Oklahoma (Host: Big 12 Conference)
  - Gaylord Entertainment Center, Nashville, Tennessee (Host: Ohio Valley Conference)

Regional semifinals and finals (Sweet Sixteen and Elite Eight)

- March 24 and 26
  - Albuquerque Regional
    - University Arena ("The Pit"), Albuquerque, New Mexico (Host: University of New Mexico)
  - Chicago Regional
    - Allstate Arena, Rosemont, Illinois (Host: DePaul University)
- March 25 and 27
  - Austin Regional
    - Frank Erwin Center, Austin, Texas (Host: University of Texas at Austin)
  - Syracuse Regional
    - Carrier Dome, Syracuse, New York (Host: Syracuse University)

National semifinals and championship (Final Four and championship)

- April 2 and 4
  - Edward Jones Dome, St. Louis, Missouri (Host: Missouri Valley Conference)

== Qualifying teams ==
=== Automatic bids ===
The following teams were automatic qualifiers for the 2005 NCAA field by virtue of winning their conference's tournament (except for the Ivy League, whose regular-season champion received the automatic bid).

Conference	School	Appearance	Last bid
ACC	Duke	29th	2004
America East	Vermont	3rd	2004
Atlantic 10	George Washington	8th	1999
Atlantic Sun	Central Florida	4th	2004
Big 12	Oklahoma State	22nd	2004
Big East	Syracuse	30th	2004
Big Sky	Montana	6th	2002
Big South	Winthrop	5th	2002
Big Ten	Illinois	25th	2004
Big West	Utah State	16th	2003
Colonial	Old Dominion	8th	1997
C-USA	Louisville	32nd	2004
Horizon	UW-Milwaukee	2nd	2003
Ivy League	Penn	21st	2003
MAAC	Niagara	2nd	1970
MAC	Ohio	12th	1994
MEAC	Delaware State	1st	Never
Mid-Con	Oakland	1st	Never
Missouri Valley	Creighton	15th	2003
Mountain West	New Mexico	11th	1999
Northeast	Fairleigh Dickinson	4th	1998
Ohio Valley	Eastern Kentucky	6th	1979
Pac-10	Washington	12th	2004
Patriot	Bucknell	3rd	1989
SEC	Florida	11th	2004
Southern	Chattanooga	9th	1997
Southland	Southeastern Louisiana	1st	Never
Sun Belt	Louisiana–Lafayette	9th	2004
SWAC	Alabama A&M	1st	Never
WAC	UTEP	16th	2004
West Coast	Gonzaga	8th	2004

=== Listed by region and seeding ===
Chicago Regional
Seed	School	Conference	Record	Berth Type
#1	Illinois	Big Ten	32–1	Automatic
#2	Oklahoma State	Big 12	24–6	Automatic
#3	Arizona	Pac-10	27–6	At-large
#4	Boston College	Big East	24–4	At-large
#5	Alabama	SEC	24–7	At-large
#6	LSU	SEC	20–9	At-large
#7	Southern Illinois	Missouri Valley	26–7	At-large
#8	Texas	Big 12	20–10	At-large
#9	Nevada	WAC	24–6	At-large
#10	Saint Mary's	WCC	25–8	At-large
#11	UAB	C-USA	21–10	At-large
#12	UW-Milwaukee	Horizon	24–5	Automatic
#13	Penn	Ivy	20–8	Automatic
#14	Utah State	Big West	24–7	Automatic
#15	Southeastern Louisiana	Southland	24–8	Automatic
#16	Fairleigh Dickinson	Northeast	20–12	Automatic

Syracuse Regional
Seed	School	Conference	Record	Berth Type
#1	North Carolina	ACC	27–4	At-large
#2	Connecticut	Big East	22–7	At-large
#3	Kansas	Big 12	23–6	At-large
#4	Florida	SEC	23–7	Automatic
#5	Villanova	Big East	22–7	At-large
#6	Wisconsin	Big Ten	22–8	At-large
#7	Charlotte	C-USA	21–7	At-large
#8	Minnesota	Big Ten	21–10	At-large
#9	Iowa State	Big 12	18–11	At-large
#10	NC State	ACC	19–13	At-large
#11	Northern Iowa	Missouri Valley	21–10	At-large
#12	New Mexico	Mountain West	26–6	Automatic
#13	Ohio	Mid-American	21–10	Automatic
#14	Bucknell	Patriot	22–9	Automatic
#15	Central Florida	Atlantic Sun	24–8	Automatic
#16	Oakland	Mid-Continent	12–18	Automatic
#16	Alabama A&M	SWAC	18–14	Automatic

Albuquerque Regional
Seed	School	Conference	Record	Berth Type
#1	Washington	Pac-10	27–5	Automatic
#2	Wake Forest	ACC	26–5	At-large
#3	Gonzaga	WCC	25–4	Automatic
#4	Louisville	C-USA	29–4	Automatic
#5	Georgia Tech	ACC	19–11	At-large
#6	Texas Tech	Big 12	20–10	At-large
#7	West Virginia	Big East	21–10	At-large
#8	Pacific	Big West	26–3	At-large
#9	Pittsburgh	Big East	20–8	At-large
#10	Creighton	Missouri Valley	23–10	Automatic
#11	UCLA	Pac-10	18–10	At-large
#12	George Washington	Atlantic 10	22–7	Automatic
#13	Louisiana–Lafayette (vacated)	Sun Belt	20–10	Automatic
#14	Winthrop	Big South	27–5	Automatic
#15	Chattanooga	SoCon	20–10	Automatic
#16	Montana	Big Sky	18–12	Automatic

Austin Regional
Seed	School	Conference	Record	Berth Type
#1	Duke	ACC	25–5	Automatic
#2	Kentucky	SEC	25–5	At-large
#3	Oklahoma	Big 12	24–7	At-large
#4	Syracuse (vacated)	Big East	27–6	Automatic
#5	Michigan State	Big Ten	22–6	At-large
#6	Utah	Mountain West	27–5	At-large
#7	Cincinnati	C-USA	24–7	At-large
#8	Stanford	Pac-10	18–12	At-large
#9	Mississippi State	SEC	22–10	At-large
#10	Iowa	Big Ten	21–11	At-large
#11	UTEP	WAC	27–7	Automatic
#12	Old Dominion	CAA	28–5	Automatic
#13	Vermont	America East	24–6	Automatic
#14	Niagara	MAAC	20–9	Automatic
#15	Eastern Kentucky	Ohio Valley	22–8	Automatic
#16	Delaware State	MEAC	19–13	Automatic

=== Bids by conference ===
Bids	Conference	Schools
6	Big 12	Iowa State, Kansas, Oklahoma, Oklahoma State, Texas, Texas Tech
6	Big East	Boston College, Connecticut, Pittsburgh, Syracuse, Villanova, West Virginia
5	ACC	Duke, Georgia Tech, NC State, North Carolina, Wake Forest
5	Big Ten	Illinois, Iowa, Michigan State, Minnesota, Wisconsin
5	SEC	Alabama, Florida, Kentucky, LSU, Mississippi State
4	C-USA	Charlotte, Cincinnati, Louisville, UAB
4	Pac-10	Arizona, Stanford, UCLA, Washington
3	Missouri Valley	Creighton, Northern Iowa, Southern Illinois
2	Big West	Pacific, Utah State
2	Mountain West	New Mexico, Utah
2	WAC	Nevada, UTEP
2	West Coast	Gonzaga, Saint Mary's
1	19 other conferences	

== Opening round ==
- March 15, University of Dayton Arena, Dayton, Ohio
  - Oakland (16) 79, Alabama A&M (16) 69

== First round ==
=== Chicago Regional ===
- March 17, RCA Dome, Indianapolis
  - Illinois (1) 67, Fairleigh Dickinson (16) 55
    Illinois, up only 32–31 at halftime, pulled away in the second half behind 19 points from Dee Brown and 13 from Luther Head.
  - Nevada (9) 61, Texas (8) 57
    Down 57–53 with 2:24 to play, the Wolf Pack of Nevada came from behind to win despite a sub-par game from star Nick Fazekas.
- March 17, Wolstein Center, Cleveland
  - UW-Milwaukee (12) 83, Alabama (5) 73
    The Horizon League champion Panthers pulled the upset behind 21 points apiece from Ed McCants and Joah Tucker.
  - Boston College (4) 85, Penn (13) 65
    Boston College steamrolled Ivy League champion Penn with a balanced attack, getting 18 points from Jared Dudley, 15 points from Craig Smith, and 14 points from Sean Marshall.
- March 17, Taco Bell Arena, Boise
  - UAB (11) 82, LSU (6) 68
    UAB led throughout with Marvett McDonald scoring 21 points, including five three-pointers.
  - Arizona (3) 66, Utah State (14) 53
    Arizona started slow, but secured the win led by Channing Frye and Salim Stoudamire each scoring 17 points.
- March 18, Ford Center, Oklahoma City
  - Southern Illinois (7) 65, Saint Mary's (10) 56
    SIU broke a late tie with St. Mary's to earn the victory.
  - Oklahoma State (2) 63, SE Louisiana (15) 50
    Oklahoma State jumped out to a 9-point halftime lead and built on it from there behind Ivan McFarlin's 18 points.

=== Albuquerque Regional ===
- March 17, Taco Bell Arena, Boise
  - Washington (1) 88, Montana (16) 77
    Top-seeded Washington easily advanced, getting 17 points from Brandon Roy off the bench.
  - Pacific (8) 79, Pittsburgh (9) 71
    Pacific nearly squandered a 15-point lead, letting Pittsburgh get within 5, but hung on to advance behind 17 from Christian Maraker and 15 from Mike Webb.
- March 18, Gaylord Entertainment Center, Nashville
  - Georgia Tech (5) 80, George Washington (12) 68
    The Yellow Jackets of Georgia Tech easily defeated George Washington, using a balanced attack of Jarrett Jack (20 points), Will Bynum (17 points), and B. J. Elder (15 points).
  - Louisville (4) 68, Louisiana-Lafayette (13) 62
    Louisville broke a tie with 3:43 left and defeated the Ragin' Cajuns behind 27 points from Francisco García, who went 7-for-7 from the free throw line in the last 1:57.
- March 17, McKale Center, Tucson
  - Texas Tech (6) 78, UCLA (11) 66
    Texas Tech handled the Bruins of UCLA easily behind 28 points from Ronald Ross.
  - Gonzaga (3) 74, Winthrop (14) 64
    After a slow start and trailing 35–33 at halftime, Gonzaga came back and defeated Winthrop behind 27 points from Adam Morrison.
- March 17, Wolstein Center, Cleveland
  - West Virginia (7) 63, Creighton (10) 61
    With the game tied 61–61 with under five seconds left, West Virginia's Tyrone Sally blocked Nate Funk's three-point attempt and then dunked off the fast break with 2.9 seconds to play to send the Mountaineers to the second round.
  - Wake Forest (2) 70, UT-Chattanooga (15) 54
    Wake Forest, trailed 27–24 at halftime, but came back in the second half behind 20 points from Chris Paul and 14 from Justin Gray.

=== Syracuse Regional ===
- March 18, Charlotte Coliseum, Charlotte
  - North Carolina (1) 96, Oakland (16) 68
    North Carolina crushed play-in winner Oakland, racing out to a 59–33 halftime lead. Marvin Williams scored 20, Sean May scored 19, and Rashad McCants added 15. Cortney Scott led all scorers with 21 for Oakland and Rawle Marshall added 16.
  - Iowa State (9) 64, Minnesota (8) 53
    Iowa State used a 10-point halftime lead and a balanced attack to win, with Curtis Stinson scoring 18, with Rahshon Clark and Jared Homan scoring 14 apiece.
- March 18, Gaylord Entertainment Center, Nashville
  - Villanova (5) 55, New Mexico (12) 47
    Villanova's stifling defense, which limited New Mexico to eleven first-half points due to New Mexico's missing many open looks, vanished in the second half. Mike Nardi scored 15 and Randy Foye had 14.
  - Florida (4) 67, Ohio (13) 62
    Florida got out to a 20-point lead, but had to hang on for the victory over the Mid-American champion Ohio. Matt Walsh scored 18 and Al Horford added 14.
- March 18, Ford Center, Oklahoma City
  - Wisconsin (6) 57, Northern Iowa (11) 52
    The Badgers of Wisconsin held off Northern Iowa, using 16 points from Kammron Taylor and 15 from Sharif Chambliss.
  - Bucknell (14) 64, Kansas (3) 63
    Patriot League champion Bucknell pulled off the stunner of the tournament, edging Kansas when Chris McNaughton scored on a bank shot with 10.5 seconds left, followed by Kansas' Wayne Simien missing an open 15-footer as time expired. This completely unexpected act earned Bucknell University an ESPY award for Greatest Upset.
- March 18, DCU Center, Worcester
  - N.C. State (10) 75, Charlotte (7) 63
    N.C. State fell into a 14-point hole just five minutes into the game, but closed the game on a 16–4 burst to win. Julius Hodge scored 19 for the Wolfpack, and Andrew Brackman added 16.
  - Connecticut (2) 77, UCF (15) 71
    The defending champion Connecticut Huskies survived a scare from Atlantic Sun champion Central Florida, who trimmed a 19-point deficit down to four. Charlie Villanueva scored 22 to lead UConn and Rudy Gay chipped in 17.

=== Austin Regional ===
- March 18, Charlotte Coliseum, Charlotte
  - Duke (1) 57, Delaware State (16) 46
    Duke won in this offensive struggle against the MEAC champion as Shelden Williams scored 14.
  - Mississippi State (9) 93, Stanford (8) 70
    After a 1-point lead at halftime, Mississippi State pulled away from Stanford with a strong second half, led by Lawrence Roberts' 23 points and Winsome Frazier's 20.
- March 18, DCU Center, Worcester
  - Michigan State (5) 89, Old Dominion (12) 81
    The Spartans of Michigan State rallied from a five-point halftime deficit to beat Old Dominion. Alan Anderson had 15 for Michigan State, Paul Davis added 14, and both Shannon Brown and Maurice Ager had 13 apiece.
  - Vermont (13) 60, Syracuse(Vacated) (4) 57 (OT)
    The Catamounts of Vermont upset Syracuse with an overtime victory. Vermont prevented point guard Gerry McNamara and senior forward Hakim Warrick from having big days. With 10 seconds left in a tie game, Germian Mopa Njila drove to the baseline and scored, but was ruled out of bounds because he stepped on the baseline. In overtime Njila (team lead 20 points) scored a three-pointer with two minutes left to put Vermont ahead. Then 48 seconds later after a steal by Njila, T. J. Sorrentine (17 points) scored a deep three-pointer to put them up by 4 with just over a minute remaining, to essentially seal the victory. This was the first-ever NCAA Tournament win for the University of Vermont.
- March 17, McKale Center, Tucson
  - Utah (6) 60, UTEP (11) 54
    A large number of UTEP fans made the trip from El Paso to Tucson to support their team; however, Utah won the game, advancing to the second round. Andrew Bogut scored 24 to lead Utah.
  - Oklahoma (3) 84, Niagara (14) 67
    Oklahoma beat the MAAC champion, getting big efforts from Drew Lavender (17 points) and five other Sooners in double figures.
- March 17, RCA Dome, Indianapolis
  - Cincinnati (7) 76, Iowa (10) 64
    Cincinnati's first-round victory over Iowa saw Jason Maxiell score 22 points, including the first two three-pointers of his college career. James White added 15 for Cincinnati.
  - Kentucky (2) 72, Eastern Kentucky (15) 64
    The higher-seeded Kentucky team prevailed in this intrastate matchup (the schools are separated by only 30 miles), with Kelenna Azubuike and Chuck Hayes both scoring 16.

== Second round ==
=== Chicago Regional ===
- March 19, RCA Dome, Indianapolis
  - Illinois (1) 71, Nevada (9) 59
    Illinois used a balanced attack of James Augustine, who had 23, Deron Williams, who had 15, and Luther Head, who had 14, to defeat the Wolf Pack and advance to the Sweet 16.
- March 19, Wolstein Center, Cleveland
  - Milwaukee (12) 83, Boston College (4) 75
    The Panthers made a surprise appearance in the Sweet Sixteen just two days after knocking off SEC contender Alabama. Joah Tucker and Ed McCants continued their strong tournament play, scoring 23 and 18, respectively. Adrian Tigert added 16.
- March 19, Taco Bell Arena, Boise
  - Arizona (3) 85, UAB (11) 63
    Arizona refused to be upset the same way Kentucky was last year against UAB in the second round, coming out strong and opening it up in the second half. Salim Stoudamire scored 20 and Hassan Adams added 16.
- March 20, Ford Center, Oklahoma City
  - Oklahoma State (2) 85, Southern Illinois (7) 77
    Ivan McFarlin again powered Oklahoma State to the win, scoring 31 and igniting a 10–2 run that help the Cowboys pull away from the Salukis, who had a seven-point halftime lead.

=== Albuquerque Regional ===
- March 19, Taco Bell Arena, Boise
  - Washington (1) 97, Pacific (8) 79
    Washington advanced behind 23 points from Nate Robinson, 19 from Bobby Jones, 15 from Tre Simmons, and 14 off the bench from Brandon Roy.
- March 20, Gaylord Entertainment Center, Nashville
  - Louisville (4) 76, Georgia Tech (5) 54
    Louisville played strong defense in eliminating the defending runner-up Yellow Jackets. Francisco García scored 21, Larry O'Bannon 16, and Taquan Dean 14.
- March 19, McKale Center, Tucson
  - Texas Tech (6) 71, Gonzaga (3) 69
    Texas Tech edged Gonzaga to earn a trip to the Sweet Sixteen. Ronald Ross led Texas Tech with 24, and Jarrius Jackson added 18.
- March 19, Wolstein Center, Cleveland
  - West Virginia (7) 111, Wake Forest (2) 105 (2 OT)
    West Virginia continued their upset run to the Sweet Sixteen with a double-overtime shootout win, erasing a thirteen-point halftime deficit. Mike Gansey led West Virginia with 29 including 19 in the overtime periods, with Tyrone Sally, the hero of the first-round victory over Creighton, scoring 21, and D'or Fischer scoring 15 off the bench.

=== Syracuse Regional ===
- March 20, Charlotte Coliseum, Charlotte
  - North Carolina (1) 92, Iowa State (9) 65
    North Carolina demolished another opponent behind 24 from Sean May, 20 bench points from Marvin Williams, 17 from Rashad McCants, and 15 from Raymond Felton.
- March 20, Gaylord Entertainment Center, Nashville
  - Villanova (5) 76, Florida (4) 65
    Villanova secured their first berth in the Sweet Sixteen since 1988 as they got 21 bench points from Jason Fraser, 18 from Randy Foye, and 15 from Kyle Lowry.
- March 20, Ford Center, Oklahoma City
  - Wisconsin (6) 71, Bucknell (14) 62
    Wisconsin ended the brief Cinderella run of Bucknell, which stunned Kansas in the first round. Mike Wilkinson scored 23 for Wisconsin, with Alando Tucker scoring 17 and Zach Morley adding 15.
- March 20, DCU Center, Worcester
  - N.C. State (10) 65, Connecticut (2) 62
    The tenth-seeded Wolfpack of N.C. State pulled the upset, knocking the defending champions out in the second round. Julius Hodge scored 17 for the Wolfpack including the game-winning layup and ensuing free throw, while Cameron Bennerman scored 15.

=== Austin Regional ===
- March 20, Charlotte Coliseum, Charlotte
  - Duke (1) 63, Mississippi State (9) 55
    Duke struggled again, but still managed to knock off the Bulldogs and advance to the Sweet 16. Daniel Ewing led Duke with 22 and JJ Redick added 16.
- March 20, DCU Center, Worcester
  - Michigan State (5) 72, Vermont (13) 61
    The Spartans of Michigan State advanced to the Sweet Sixteen. Maurice Ager scored 19 for Michigan State, with Kelvin Torbert adding 14 off the bench.
- March 19, McKale Center, Tucson
  - Utah (6) 67, Oklahoma (3) 58
    Utah advanced to the Sweet Sixteen with a victory over the Sooners of Oklahoma. Justin Hawkins scored 20 for Utah, while Marc Jackson scored 17, and Bryant Markson scored 16.
- March 19, RCA Dome, Indianapolis
  - Kentucky (2) 69, Cincinnati (7) 60
    Kentucky moved on to the Sweet Sixteen behind 17 points from Kelenna Azubuike, and 16 from Rajon Rondo. Three other Wildcats scored in double figures.

== Regionals ==
=== Chicago Regional ===
At Allstate Arena, Rosemont, Illinois

==== Semifinals ====
- March 24
  - Illinois (1) 77, Milwaukee (12) 63
    Milwaukee, who had knocked off powerhouses Alabama and Boston College in the last week, had their Cinderella run come to an abrupt end against the tournament's top-seeded team. Milwaukee stayed with Illinois for most of the first half, only trailing 29–26 with 3:38 to play in the half, but then Illinois reeled off a 7–0 run to push the lead to ten, and Milwaukee never recovered, never getting closer than seven points for the rest of the game. Following this impressive run, Milwaukee coach Bruce Pearl accepted a job as the head basketball coach at the University of Tennessee.
  - Arizona (3) 79, Oklahoma State (2) 78
    In the other and more climactic Midwest Regional semifinal, Arizona squeaked by Oklahoma State when Salim Stoudamire canned a jumper with 2.8 seconds remaining. The game had been back-and-forth all night long, with Arizona leading by three at halftime but then letting up, allowing Oklahoma State to take a five-point lead at 72–67 with 4:29 remaining. Arizona and Oklahoma State then traded baskets, and Stoudamire sliced the Oklahoma State lead to 76–75 with 1:58 left on a three-pointer. After Joey Graham put Oklahoma State back up by one with eighteen seconds to play, Stoudamire nailed his game-winner to send Arizona to the Regional Finals.

==== Final ====
- March 26
  - Illinois (1) 90, Arizona (3) 89 (OT)
    In one of the most thrilling NCAA basketball games ever, Illinois pulled off an improbable comeback to break the hearts of Wildcats fans everywhere. After a close first half, Arizona came out gunning in the second half, opening up a 75–60 lead with only four minutes left in the second half. Illinois then closed the half on a 20–5 run to force overtime using a stingy defense, layups, and three-pointers, the last of which by Deron Williams tied the game at 80–80 with 39 seconds in regulation. The run broke down Arizona completely, and Illinois opened up a 90–84 lead in overtime before Arizona scored five straight to cut the lead to one, but Hassan Adams missed a three at the buzzer to give Illinois the win and a berth in the Final Four.

=== Albuquerque Regional ===
At University Arena, Albuquerque

==== Semifinals ====
- March 24
  - Louisville (4) 93, Washington (1) 79
    Louisville dominated top-seeded Washington, using a big spurt late in the first half and then cruising from there. After an evenly matched sixteen minutes that saw Washington lead 30–29, Louisville went on an 18–5 run to close the first half, with the big shots coming from Francisco García, who nailed two three-pointers during that stretch to extend the lead. Washington tried a second-half comeback, cutting Louisville's lead to 67–61 with 8:41 left, but Louisville had enough to pull away.
  - West Virginia (7) 65, Texas Tech (6) 60
    Seventh-seeded West Virginia continued to roll onto the Regional Finals, engaging in a close battle with Texas Tech before pulling away in the second half. West Virginia took the lead for good when Kevin Pittsnogle drained a three with 6:14 to play, and held it from there, with Pittsnogle sinking two huge free throws with seventeen seconds left and West Virginia up by two to put the game out of reach.

==== Final ====
- March 26
  - Louisville (4) 93, West Virginia (7) 85 (OT)
    In another Regional Final overtime game (and a preview of a future Big East rivalry), West Virginia opened up the game at a blistering pace, using five three-pointers to jump out to a 19–5 lead. When Joe Herber made a three, West Virginia had a 32–13 lead with 5:30 to play in the first half. West Virginia led by thirteen at halftime, but Louisville finally went to a zone defense coming out of the half, and West Virginia began to go cold. Louisville cut the lead to three nine minutes into the second half, but Kevin Pittsnogle extended the West Virginia lead to ten with six minutes to play with a three. But West Virginia missed their last four field goals and Louisville tied the game with 38 seconds to play on Larry O'Bannon's layup. Louisville had grabbed the momentum and scored sixteen points in overtime to secure a berth in the Final Four.

=== Syracuse Regional ===
At Carrier Dome, Syracuse

==== Semifinals ====
- March 25
  - North Carolina (1) 67, Villanova (5) 66
    In a tight Sweet Sixteen contest, the top-seeded Tar Heels barely made it to the Regional Finals. The entire game was officiated closely—the first television timeout came after Villanova garnered its fifth personal foul, and two fouls led to the disqualification from the game of North Carolina star Raymond Felton with under five minutes left. Fifth-seeded Villanova stuck with UNC despite falling behind 64–54 with 3:45 left in the game. The Wildcats stormed back to cut the lead to 66–63. With eleven seconds left Allan Ray drove the lane, received contact as he made a basket, but was called for a travel on the play. On the ensuing possession, Villanova immediately fouled. Rashad McCants then made a free throw to seal the North Carolina victory.
  - Wisconsin (6) 65, N.C. State (10) 56
    After upsetting two higher-seeded teams, including the defending national champion, N.C. State took a nine-point halftime lead against sixth-seeded Wisconsin before the Badgers woke up, using a 13–0 second-half run to turn a three-point deficit into a ten-point lead. N.C. State hung in, cutting the Wisconsin lead to 53–49 with 5:03 to play, and then only trailed 59–54 with 1:50 to play, but N.C. State ran out of miracles and energy and their Cinderella run ended, denying them a matchup with their most hated rival for a trip to St. Louis.

==== Final ====
- March 27
  - North Carolina (1) 88, Wisconsin (6) 82
    The third regional final matched up the top seeded North Carolina Tar Heels and the sixth seeded Badgers from Wisconsin. The Tar Heels started off hot in this one as Sean May and Rashad McCants scored at will. When point guard Raymond Felton garnered his second foul, head coach Roy Williams decided to pull him to prevent further foul trouble. Up 11 at the time, it seemed to be the right move. Wisconsin would prove Williams wrong as they finished the half on an 11–0 run, tying the game at 44 heading into the half. The Tar Heels struggled to start the second half as hot as the first and trailed for the first time since the opening minutes of the game. Sparked by May's 29 points and 11 boards and Felton's clutch free throws, they outlasted the Badgers and won the game by six in regulation.

=== Austin Regional ===
At Frank Erwin Center, Austin

==== Semifinals ====
- March 25
  - Michigan State (5) 78, Duke (1) 68
    The Spartans of Michigan State continued on to the Regional Finals by outplaying Duke in the second half and breaking a 32–32 halftime tie. Michigan State came out in the second half and secured the momentum in slowly, but surely, pulling away from Duke. The Spartans got out to a nine-point lead, allowed Duke to get within two, but then, scoring their last ten points of the game on free throws, moved on to the Regional Finals.
  - Kentucky (2) 62, Utah (6) 52
    After playing Kentucky well in the first half, only trailing by five at halftime, Utah ran out of steam. Utah's last chance to win the game came after Andrew Bogut missed a free throw with Utah down 38–35 with 12:17 to play. Kentucky gradually pulled away to meet Michigan State in the Regional Finals.

==== Final ====
- March 27
  - Michigan State (5) 94, Kentucky (2) 88 (2 OT)
    In this double-overtime thriller, Kentucky started out well and led Michigan State by four at halftime, but Michigan State caught up in the second half, actually leading 70–62 with 5:43 to play. Kentucky rallied back, however, cutting the lead to one when Kelenna Azubuike drained a three with 1:19 to play. After Patrick Sparks missed the front end of a one-and-one with 41 seconds to play, Michigan State's Shannon Brown appeared to ice the game with two free throws with 20 seconds to play. But with time expiring, Sparks put up a prayer from three, and the ball bounced around the rim four times before falling in. After the referees spent nearly ten minutes reviewing the play, they upheld that Sparks' shot was a three pointer, sending the game into overtime. In the first overtime, neither team relented, and Brown hit a key three-point basket for Michigan State to keep them in the game. Kentucky's Azubuike missed a three as time expired to send the game into double overtime. In the second overtime, Michigan State's mettle finally won the game for them, as they scored 11 of their 13 points from the free throw line to finally seal the game and send them to the Final Four for the fourth time under coach Tom Izzo.

== Final Four ==
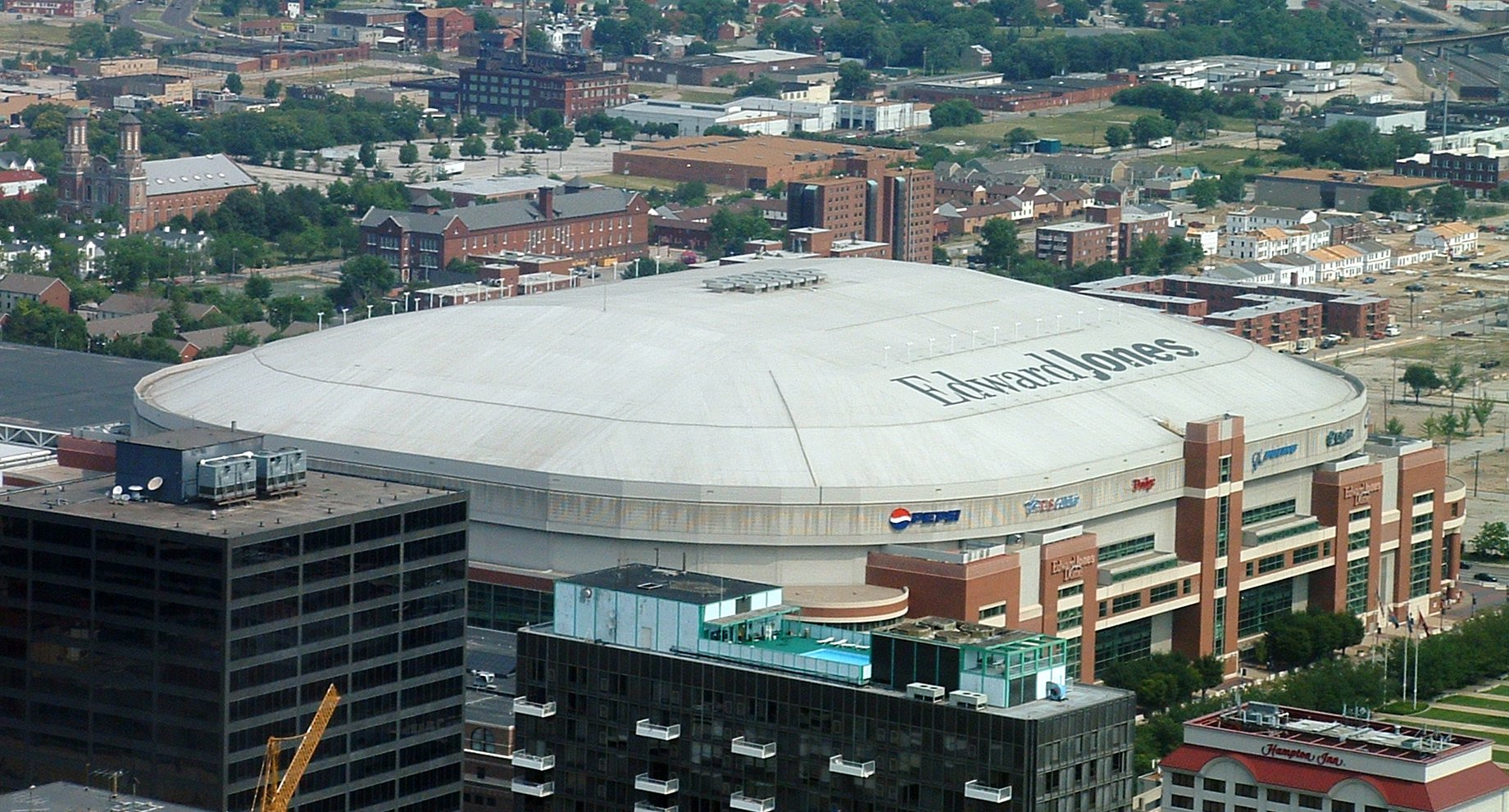
The Edward Jones Dome was host of the Final Four and National Championship in 2005.

At Edward Jones Dome, St. Louis

=== National semifinals ===
- April 2
  - Illinois (Chicago 1) 72, Louisville (Albuquerque 4) 57
  In a packed Edwards Jones Dome, the battle between Chicago Regional Champions Illinois and Albuquerque Regional Champions Louisville took place. Although nearly three-fourths of the crowd were Illini fans, the fourth-seeded Louisville Cardinals were not fazed and gave the overall top-seeded Fighting Illini all they could handle, trailing only by three at halftime, but Illinois used an early second-half run to pull away from the Cardinals and earn a bid in the national championship game.
  - North Carolina (Syracuse 1) 87, Michigan State (Austin 5) 71
  In the battle between Syracuse Regional Champions North Carolina and Austin Regional Champions Michigan State, North Carolina used a 54-point second half to erase a five-point halftime deficit and down the Spartans, who were making their fourth appearance in the Final Four under coach Tom Izzo.

=== National Championship Game ===
- April 4
  - North Carolina (Syracuse 1) 75, Illinois (Chicago 1) 70

North Carolina was looking for its 4th National Championship, while Illinois was playing in its first. It was a tight contest for much of the first half before an 8–0 run by North Carolina allowed them to take a 35–25 lead. Eventually they would take a 40–27 lead into halftime. North Carolina increased its lead to 15 at one point in the second half. But Illinois began a furious charge: at one point, they would hit seven consecutive shots from the floor to turn a fifteen-point lead back to four. Unfazed, North Carolina would push the lead back up to ten before a 10–0 run by the Illini tied the game at 65-65. Illinois would tie the game at 70–70 on a three by Luther Head. But North Carolina would fight back as freshman Marvin Williams tapped back a Rashad McCants missed shot to put North Carolina back in front. Illinois would get several cracks to take the lead but were unable to convert. Eventually, Raymond Felton was able to steal the ball from Head, forcing Deron Williams to foul. However, Felton converted on 1 of 2 free throws, giving Illinois one last chance. But Luther Head's three pointer bounced high and out. Eventually it went into the hands of Felton who this time connected on both free throws to give North Carolina a 75–70 victory. For North Carolina head coach Roy Williams, it was his first national championship. Illinois was denied a chance to set the NCAA record for most wins in a season, instead tying it at 37. Sean May scored 26 points as he took the MOP of the Final Four.

== Bracket ==
=== Opening Round game – Dayton, Ohio ===
Winner advances to Syracuse Regional vs. No. 1 North Carolina.

Opening Round; March 15
16	Oakland	79
16	Alabama A&M	69

=== Chicago Regional ===
First round March 17–18
1	Illinois	67
16	Fairleigh Dickinson	55
Indianapolis - Thu/Sat
8	Texas	57
9	Nevada	61
5	Alabama	73
12	UW–Milwaukee	83
Cleveland - Thu/Sat
4	Boston College	85
13	Pennsylvania	65
6	LSU	68
11	UAB	82
Boise - Thu/Sat
3	Arizona	66
14	Utah State	53
7	Southern Illinois	65
10	St. Mary's	56
Oklahoma City - Fri/Sun
2	Oklahoma State	63
15	Southeastern Louisiana	50

Second round March 19–20
1	Illinois	71
9	Nevada	59
12	UW–Milwaukee	83
4	Boston College	75
11	UAB	63
3	Arizona	85
7	Southern Illinois	77
2	Oklahoma State	85

Regional semifinals March 24
1	Illinois	77
12	UW–Milwaukee	63
3	Arizona	79
2	Oklahoma State	78

Regional Final; March 26
1	Illinois	90^{OT}
3	Arizona	89

==== Chicago regional final ====
CBS

March 26

Box score

No. 3 Arizona Wildcats 89, No. 1 Illinois Fighting Illini 90 (OT)
Scoring by half: 36–38, 44–42 Overtime: 9–10
Pts: Channing Frye, 24; Rebs: Channing Frye, 12; Asts: Salim Stoudamire, 7	Pts: Deron Williams, 22; Rebs: James Augustine, 6 Asts: Deron Williams, 10

Allstate Arena – Rosemont, Illinois
Attendance: 16,957
Referees: Robert Donato, Randy McCall, Doug Shows

==== Chicago regional all-tournament team ====
- Deron Williams – Illinois (MOP)
- Hassan Adams – Arizona
- Channing Frye – Arizona
- Salim Stoudamire – Arizona
- Luther Head – Illinois

=== Albuquerque Regional ===
First round March 17–18
1	Washington	88
16	Montana	77
Boise - Thu/Sat
8	Pacific	79
9	Pittsburgh	71
5	Georgia Tech	80
12	George Washington	68
Nashville - Fri/Sun
4	Louisville	68
13	Louisiana-Lafayette	62
6	Texas Tech	78
11	UCLA	66
Tucson - Thu/Sat
3	Gonzaga	74
14	Winthrop	64
7	West Virginia	63
10	Creighton	61
Cleveland - Thu/Sat
2	Wake Forest	70
15	UT-Chattanooga	54

Second round March 19–20
1	Washington	97
8	Pacific	79
5	Georgia Tech	54
4	Louisville	76
6	Texas Tech	71
3	Gonzaga	69
7	West Virginia	111^{2OT}
2	Wake Forest	105

Regional semifinals March 24
1	Washington	79
4	Louisville	93
6	Texas Tech	60
7	West Virginia	65

Regional Final; March 26
4	Louisville	93^{OT}
7	West Virginia	85

==== Albuquerque regional final ====
CBS

March 26

Box score

No. 7 West Virginia Mountaineers 85, No. 4 Louisville Cardinals 93 (OT)
Scoring by half: 40–27, 37–50 Overtime: 8–16
Pts: Kevin Pittsnogle, 25; Rebs: Kevin Pittsnogle, 5 Asts: 2 tied, 5	Pts: Larry O'Bannon, 24; Rebs: Ellis Myles, 7 Asts: Francisco García, 8

The Pit – Albuquerque, New Mexico
Attendance: 15,896
Referees: Tim Higgins, J.D. Collins, Ed Hightower

==== Albuquerque regional all-tournament team ====
- Larry O'Bannon – Louisville (MOP)
- Taquan Dean – Louisville
- Francisco García – Louisville
- Patrick Beilein – West Virginia
- Kevin Pittsnogle – West Virginia

=== Syracuse Regional ===
First round March 18
1	North Carolina	96
16	Oakland	68
Charlotte - Fri/Sun
8	Minnesota	53
9	Iowa State	64
5	Villanova	55
12	New Mexico	47
Nashville - Fri/Sun
4	Florida	67
13	Ohio	62
6	Wisconsin	57
11	Northern Iowa	52
Oklahoma City - Fri/Sun
3	Kansas	63
14	Bucknell	64
7	Charlotte	63
10	NC State	75
Worcester - Fri/Sun
2	Connecticut	77
15	UCF	71

Second round March 20
1	North Carolina	92
9	Iowa State	65
5	Villanova	76
4	Florida	65
6	Wisconsin	71
14	Bucknell	62
10	NC State	65
2	Connecticut	62

Regional semifinals March 25
1	North Carolina	67
5	Villanova	66
6	Wisconsin	65
10	NC State	56

Regional Final; March 27
1	North Carolina	88
6	Wisconsin	82

==== Syracuse regional final ====
CBS

March 27

Box score

No. 6 Wisconsin Badgers 82, No. 1 North Carolina Tar Heels 88
Scoring by half: 44–44, 38–44
Pts: Alando Tucker, 25; Rebs: Mike Wilkinson, 7 Asts: Mike Wilkinson, 5	Pts: Sean May, 29; Rebs: Sean May, 12; Asts: Raymond Felton, 7

Carrier Dome – Syracuse, New York
Attendance: 30,132
Referees: John Cahill, Dick Cartmell, Bruce Hicks

==== Syracuse regional all-tournament team ====
- Sean May – North Carolina (MOP)
- Rashad McCants – North Carolina
- Randy Foye – Villanova
- Clayton Hanson – Wisconsin
- Alando Tucker – Wisconsin

=== Austin Regional ===
First round March 17–18
1	Duke	57
16	Delaware State	46
Charlotte - Fri/Sun
8	Stanford	70
9	Mississippi State	93
5	Michigan State	89
12	Old Dominion	81
Worcester - Fri/Sun
4	Syracuse	57
13	Vermont	60^{OT}
6	Utah	60
11	UTEP	54
Tucson - Thu/Sat
3	Oklahoma	84
14	Niagara	67
7	Cincinnati	76
10	Iowa	64
Indianapolis - Thu/Sat
2	Kentucky	72
15	Eastern Kentucky	64

Second round March 19–20
1	Duke	63
9	Mississippi State	55
5	Michigan State	72
13	Vermont	61
6	Utah	67
3	Oklahoma	58
7	Cincinnati	60
2	Kentucky	69

Regional semifinals March 25
1	Duke	68
5	Michigan State	78
6	Utah	52
2	Kentucky	62

Regional Final; March 27
5	Michigan State	94^{2OT}
2	Kentucky	88

==== Austin regional final ====
CBS

March 27

Box score

No. 5 Michigan State Spartans 94, No. 2 Kentucky Wildcats 88 (2OT)
Scoring by half: 33–37, 42–38 Overtime: 6–6, 13–7
Pts: Shannon Brown, 24; Rebs: Paul Davis, 11; Asts: Chris Hill, 4	Pts: Randolph Morris, 20; Rebs: Ravi Moss, 6 Asts: 4 tied, 3

Frank Erwin Center – Austin, Texas
Attendance: 16,239
Referees: Jim Burr, Mark Whitehead, John Higgins

==== Austin regional all-tournament team ====
- Shannon Brown – Michigan State (MOP)
- Chuck Hayes – Kentucky
- Maurice Ager – Michigan State
- Paul Davis – Michigan State
- Andrew Bogut – Utah

=== Final Four — St. Louis, Missouri ===
National semifinals April 2
CH1	Illinois	72
AL4	Louisville	57
SY1	North Carolina	87
AU5	Michigan State	71

National Championship Game; April 4
CH1	Illinois	70
SY1	North Carolina	75

==== National semifinals ====
CBS

April 2

Box score

AL4 Louisville Cardinals 57, CH1 Illinois Fighting Illini 72
Scoring by half: 28−31, 29−41
Pts: Ellis Myles, 17; Rebs: Ellis Myles, 7 Asts: Larry O'Bannon, 4	Pts: 2 tied, 20; Rebs: James Augustine, 11; Asts: Deron Williams, 9

Edward Jones Dome – St. Louis, Missouri
Attendance: 47,754
Referees: Jim Burr, Ed Hightower, Doug Shows

CBS

April 2

Box score

AU5 Michigan State Spartans 71, SY1 North Carolina Tar Heels 87
Scoring by half: 38−33, 33−54
Pts: Maurice Ager, 24; Rebs: Paul Davis, 15; Asts: Kelvin Torbert, 6	Pts: Sean May, 22; Rebs: 3 tied, 8 Asts: Raymond Felton, 7

Edward Jones Dome – St. Louis, Missouri
Attendance: 47,754
Referees: Robert Donato, Reggie Greenwood, Randy McCall

==== National championship ====
CBS

April 4

Box score

SY1 North Carolina Tar Heels 75, CH1 Illinois Fighting Illini 70
Scoring by half: 40–27, 35–43
Pts: Sean May, 26; Rebs: Sean May, 10; Asts: Raymond Felton, 7	Pts: Luther Head, 21; Rebs: Roger Powell, 14; Asts: 2 tied, 7

Edward Jones Dome – St. Louis, Missouri
Attendance: 47,262
Referees: Ed Corbett, John Cahill, Verne Harris

==== Final Four all-tournament team ====
- Sean May – North Carolina (MOP)
- Luther Head – Illinois
- Deron Williams – Illinois
- Raymond Felton – North Carolina
- Rashad McCants – North Carolina

== Record by conference ==
Conference	# of Bids	Record	Win %	R32	S16	E8	F4	CG
Big East	6	7–6	.538	4	2	1	–	–
SEC	5	5–5	.500	3	1	1	–	–
Big Ten	5	12–5	.706	3	3	3	2	1
ACC	5	12–4	.750	5	3	1	1	1
Big 12	6	6–6	.500	4	2	–	–	–
Pac-10	4	5–4	.556	2	2	1	–	–
Missouri Valley	3	1–3	.250	1	–	–	–	–
Big West	2	1–2	.333	1	–	–	–	–
C–USA	4	6–4	.600	3	1	1	1	–
MWC	2	2–2	.500	1	1	–	–	–
WAC	2	1–2	.333	1	–	–	–	–
Horizon League	1	2–1	.667	1	1	–	–	–
WCC	2	1–2	.333	1	–	–	–	–
Patriot League	1	1–1	.500	1	–	–	–	–
America East Conference	1	1–1	.500	1	–	–	–	–
Mid-Continent	1	1–1 *	.500	-	–	–	–	–

* Oakland won the Opening Round game.

The Atlantic 10, Atlantic Sun, Big Sky, Big South, CAA, Ivy, MAAC, MAC, MEAC, Northeast, Ohio Valley, SoCon, Southland, SWAC, and Sun Belt conferences all went 0–1.

The columns R32, S16, E8, F4, and CG respectively stand for the Round of 32, Sweet Sixteen, Elite Eight, Final Four, and championship Game.

== Television ==
ESPN carried the opening round game.

- Brent Musburger and Steve Lavin – Opening Round Game at Dayton, Ohio

Rece Davis served as studio host, joined by analyst Fran Fraschilla.

CBS Sports carried the remaining 63 games. They were carried on a regional basis until the Elite Eight, at which point all games were shown nationally.

- Jim Nantz, Billy Packer, & Bonnie Bernstein – First & Second Round at Charlotte, North Carolina; Austin Regional at Austin, Texas; Final Four at St. Louis, Missouri
- Dick Enberg, Jay Bilas, & Armen Keteyian – First & Second Round at Indianapolis, Indiana; Chicago Regional at Chicago, Illinois
- Verne Lundquist and Bill Raftery – First & Second Round at Nashville, Tennessee; Syracuse Regional at Syracuse, New York
- Gus Johnson, Len Elmore, and Tracy Wolfson – First & Second Round at Worcester, Massachusetts; Albuquerque Regional at Albuquerque, New Mexico
- Kevin Harlan and Dan Bonner – First & Second Round at Tucson, Arizona
- Ian Eagle and Jim Spanarkel – First & Second Round at Cleveland, Ohio
- Craig Bolerjack and Bob Wenzel – First & Second Round at Oklahoma City, Oklahoma
- Tim Brando and Mike Gminski – First & Second Round at Boise, Idaho

Greg Gumbel once again served as the studio host, joined by analysts Clark Kellogg and Seth Davis.

The television rating indicated the tournament was watched by an average of 10.6 million viewers.

== Radio ==
Westwood One had exclusive radio coverage.

Play-by-play announcer	Color analyst(s)	Round(s)	Site(s)
		1st/2nd rounds	Cleveland, Ohio

John Tautges once again served as studio host.

== Local radio ==
Region	Seed	Teams	Flagship station	Play-by-play announcer	Color analyst(s)
Syracuse	3	Kansas	KLWN-AM 1320	Bob Davis	Max Falkenstein
Chicago	4	Boston College	(Boston College)		
Chicago	5	Alabama	(Alabama)		
Chicago	6	LSU	WDGL-FM 98.1; WWL-AM 870	Jim Hawthorne	Kevin Ford
Chicago	12	Wisconsin–Milwaukee	(Wisconsin–Milwaukee)		
Chicago	13	Penn	(Penn)		
Albuquerque	2	Wake Forest	(Wake Forest)		
Albuquerque	7	West Virginia	(West Virginia)	Tony Caridi	Jay Jacobs
Albuquerque	10	Creighton	(Creighton)		
Albuquerque	15	UT-Chattanooga	(UT-Chattanooga)		

== See also ==
- 2005 NCAA Division II men's basketball tournament
- 2005 NCAA Division III men's basketball tournament
- 2005 NCAA Division I women's basketball tournament
- 2005 NCAA Division II women's basketball tournament
- 2005 NCAA Division III women's basketball tournament
- 2005 National Invitation Tournament
- 2005 Women's National Invitation Tournament
- 2005 NAIA Division I men's basketball tournament
- 2005 NAIA Division II men's basketball tournament
- 2005 NAIA Division I women's basketball tournament
- 2005 NAIA Division II women's basketball tournament
