= 2004–05 Nevada Wolf Pack men's basketball team =

American college basketball season

2004–05 Nevada Wolf Pack men's basketball

WAC Regular season champion

NCAA tournament, second round
- Conference: Western Athletic Conference
- Record: 25–7 (16–2 WAC)
- Head coach: Mark Fox (1st season)
- Home arena: Lawlor Events Center

2004–05 WAC men's basketball standings
	Conf.				Overall
Team	W		L	PCT	W		L	PCT
Nevada	16	–	2	.889	25	–	7	.781
UTEP †	14	–	4	.778	27	–	8	.771
Rice	12	–	6	.667	19	–	12	.613
Fresno State	9	–	9	.500	16	–	14	.533
Louisiana Tech	9	–	9	.500	14	–	15	.483
SMU	9	–	9	.500	14	–	14	.500
Hawaii	7	–	11	.389	16	–	13	.552
Boise State	6	–	12	.333	16	–	18	.471
Tulsa	5	–	13	.278	9	–	20	.310
San Jose State	3	–	15	.167	6	–	23	.207
† 2005 WAC tournament winner

The 2004–05 Nevada Wolf Pack men's basketball team represented the University of Nevada, Reno during the 2003–04 NCAA Division I men's basketball season. The Wolf Pack, led by former assistant and first-year head coach Mark Fox, played their home games at the Lawlor Events Center on their campus in Reno, Nevada as members of the Western Athletic Conference (WAC).

After finishing atop the conference regular season standings, Nevada was upset in the quarterfinal round of the WAC tournament, but did receive an at-large bid to the NCAA tournament as No. 9 seed in the Chicago Region. The Wolf Pack defeated Texas in the opening round before falling to No. 1 overall seed and eventual national runner-up Illinois in the round of 32. This was the second straight season in which Nevada's season was ended by the national runner-up. The team finished with a record of 25–7 (16–2 WAC).

== Roster ==
2004–05 Nevada Wolf Pack men's basketball team
Players
Coaches

Pos.	#	Name	Height	Weight	Year	Previous school	Hometown
G	11	Ramon Sessions	6 ft 3 in (1.91 m)	190 lb (86 kg)	Fr	Myrtle Beach	Myrtle Beach, SC
F	21	Kevinn Pinkney	6 ft 10 in (2.08 m)	245 lb (111 kg)	Sr	Colton	Colton, CA
F	22	Nick Fazekas	6 ft 11 in (2.11 m)	235 lb (107 kg)	So	Ralston Valley	Arvada, CO

Head coach

- Mark Fox (Eastern New Mexico)

Assistant coach(es)

Legend

- (C) Team captain
- (S) Suspended
- (I) Ineligible
- (W) Walk-on
- Injured
- Current redshirt

Roster

== Schedule and results ==
Date time, TV	Rank^{#}	Opponent^{#}	Result	Record	Site city, state
Regular season
Nov 26, 2004*		at Georgia	W 58–47	3–0	Stegeman Coliseum; Athens, Georgia
Nov 29, 2004*		at No. 2 Kansas	L 52–85	3–1	Allen Fieldhouse; Lawrence, Kansas
Feb 19, 2005*		Vermont	W 74–64	20–5	Lawlor Events Center; Reno, Nevada
WAC tournament
Mar 10, 2005*		Boise State; Quarterfinals	L 72–73	24–6	Lawlor Events Center; Reno, Nevada
NCAA tournament
Mar 17, 2005*	(9 CHI)	vs. (8 CHI) Texas; First Round	W 61–57	25–6	RCA Dome; Indianapolis, Indiana
Mar 19, 2005*	(9 CHI)	vs. (1 CHI) No. 1 Illinois; Second Round	L 59–71	25–7	RCA Dome; Indianapolis, Indiana
*Non-conference game. (#) Tournament seedings in parentheses. CHI=Chicago. All times are in Pacific Time.
