= 2004–05 Alabama Crimson Tide men's basketball team =

American college basketball season

2004–05 Alabama Crimson Tide men's basketball

SEC Western Division co-champions

NCAA tournament, first round
- Conference: Southeastern Conference
- Western Division

Ranking
- AP: No. 21
- Record: 24–8 (12–4 SEC)
- Head coach: Mark Gottfried (7th season)
- Assistant coaches: Philip Pearson; Orlando Early; Tom Asbury
- Home arena: Coleman Coliseum (Capacity: 15,316)

2004–05 Southeastern Conference men's basketball standings
	Conf.				Overall
Team	W		L	PCT	W		L	PCT
East
No. 7 Kentucky	14	–	2	.875	28	–	6	.824
No. 16 Florida †	12	–	4	.750	24	–	8	.750
Vanderbilt	8	–	8	.500	20	–	14	.588
South Carolina	7	–	9	.438	20	–	13	.606
Tennessee	6	–	10	.375	14	–	17	.452
Georgia	2	–	14	.125	8	–	20	.286
West
No. 21 Alabama	12	–	4	.750	24	–	8	.750
LSU	12	–	4	.750	20	–	10	.667
Mississippi State	9	–	7	.563	23	–	11	.676
Arkansas	6	–	10	.375	18	–	12	.600
Ole Miss	4	–	12	.250	14	–	17	.452
Auburn	4	–	12	.250	14	–	17	.452
† 2005 SEC tournament winner Rankings from AP Poll

The 2004–05 Alabama Crimson Tide men's basketball team (variously "Alabama", "UA", "Bama" or "The Tide") represented the University of Alabama in the 2004–05 college basketball season. The head coach was Mark Gottfried, who was in his seventh season at Alabama. The team played its home games at Coleman Coliseum in Tuscaloosa, Alabama and was a member of the Southeastern Conference. This was the 92nd season of basketball in the school's history. The Crimson Tide finished the season 24–8, 12–4 in SEC play, lost in the semifinals of the 2005 SEC men's basketball tournament. They were invited to the NCAA tournament and lost in the first round.

== Schedule and results ==
Date time, TV	Rank^{#}	Opponent^{#}	Result	Record	Site (attendance) city, state
Exhibition
November 10, 2004*; 7:00 p.m.		Stillman College	W 104–50		Coleman Coliseum; Tuscaloosa, AL
November 13, 2004*; 2:00 p.m.		Athletes in Action	W 89–63		Coleman Coliseum; Tuscaloosa, AL
Non-conference regular season
November 19, 2004*; 5:30 p.m.	No. 18	Western Carolina	W 97–66	1–0	Coleman Coliseum (8,891); Tuscaloosa, AL
November 21, 2004*; 3:30 p.m.	No. 18	North Texas	W 85–71	2–0	Coleman Coliseum (8,975); Tuscaloosa, AL
November 24, 2004*; 10:30 p.m.	No. 19	vs. Alaska Anchorage; Great Alaska Shootout	W 90–55	3–0	Sullivan Arena; Anchorage, AK
November 26, 2004*; 8:30 p.m.	No. 19	vs. Minnesota; Great Alaska Shootout	W 78–72	4–0	Sullivan Arena (7,583); Anchorage, AK
November 27, 2004*; 9:00 p.m., ESPN2	No. 19	vs. No. 22 Washington; Great Alaska Shootout Championship	L 76–79	4–1	Sullivan Arena (8,264); Anchorage, AK
December 1, 2004*; 7:00 p.m.	No. 22	East Tennessee State	W 114–77	5–1	Coleman Coliseum (8,067); Tuscaloosa, AL
December 4, 2004*; 6:00 p.m.	No. 22	at Charlotte	W 102–101 ^{3OT}	6–1	Dale F. Halton Arena (8,511); Charlotte, NC
December 7, 2004*; 7:00 p.m.	No. 18	Alabama State	W 72–54	7–1	Coleman Coliseum (7,127); Tuscaloosa, AL
December 11, 2004*; 6:00 p.m.	No. 18	Temple	W 75–71	8–1	Coleman Coliseum (11,751); Tuscaloosa, AL
December 18, 2004*; 6:00 p.m.	No. 17	Tennessee State	W 87–79	9–1	Coleman Coliseum (8,018); Tuscaloosa, AL
December 22, 2004*; 7:00 p.m.	No. 19	Texas A&M–Corpus Christi	W 76–54	10–1	Coleman Coliseum (8,184); Tuscaloosa, AL
December 29, 2004*; 6:30 p.m., ESPN2	No. 18	at Wisconsin	L 62–76	10–2	Kohl Center (17,142); Madison, Wisconsin
January 1, 2005*; 6:00 p.m.	No. 18	New Orleans	W 68–57	11–2	Coleman Coliseum (7,988); Tuscaloosa, AL
SEC regular season
January 5, 2005; 9:00 p.m.	No. 19	at Vanderbilt	L 56–70	11–3 (0–1)	Memorial Gymnasium (12,231); Nashville, TN
January 8, 2005; 5:00 p.m.	No. 19	LSU	W 73–58	12–3 (1–1)	Coleman Coliseum (11,558); Tuscaloosa, AL
January 11, 2005; 8:00 p.m., ESPN	No. 23	at Arkansas	W 64–61	13–3 (2–1)	Bud Walton Arena (18,533); Fayetteville, Arkansas
January 18, 2005; 8:00 p.m., ESPN	No. 22	No. 17 Mississippi State	W 98–49	14–3 (3–1)	Coleman Coliseum (13,787); Tuscaloosa, AL
January 22, 2005; 3:00 p.m.	No. 22	at Ole Miss	W 66–58	15–3 (4–1)	Tad Smith Coliseum (6,523); Oxford, MS
January 26, 2005; 7:00 p.m.	No. 14	at Auburn; Iron Bowl of basketball	W 60–55	16–3 (5–1)	Beard-Eaves-Memorial Coliseum (10,127); Auburn, AL
January 31, 2005; 7:00 p.m.	No. 14	Georgia	W 75–47	17–3 (6–1)	Coleman Coliseum (12,545); Tuscaloosa, AL
February 5, 2005; 2:00 p.m.	No. 11	at Florida	L 54–85	17–4 (6–2)	O'Connell Center (11,787); Gainesville, Florida
February 9, 2005; 7:00 p.m.	No. 17	at Tennessee	W 72–54	18–4 (7–2)	Thompson–Boling Arena (12,650); Knoxville, Tennessee
February 12, 2005; 6:00 p.m.	No. 17	Ole Miss	W 71–45	19–4 (8–2)	Coleman Coliseum (12,165); Tuscaloosa, AL
February 16, 2005; 7:00 p.m.	No. 16	Arkansas	W 72–63	20–4 (9–2)	Coleman Coliseum (9,410); Tuscaloosa, AL
February 19, 2005; 2:00 p.m.	No. 16	South Carolina	W 87–68	21–4 (10–2)	Coleman Coliseum (15,316); Tuscaloosa, AL
February 22, 2005; 8:00 p.m.	No. 16	at LSU	L 59–61	21–5 (10–3)	Pete Maravich Assembly Center (11,339); Baton Rouge, LA
February 26, 2005; 12:30 p.m., CBS	No. 16	No. 5 Kentucky	L 71–78	21–6 (10–4)	Coleman Coliseum (15,316); Tuscaloosa, AL
March 2, 2005; 7:00 p.m.	No. 21	Auburn; Iron Bowl of basketball	W 94–53	22–6 (11–4)	Coleman Coliseum (12,402); Tuscaloosa, AL
March 5, 2005; 1:00 p.m.	No. 21	at Mississippi State	W 68–63	23–6 (12–4)	Humphrey Coliseum (10,432); Starkville, MS
SEC tournament
March 11, 2005; 12:00 p.m.	(W1) No. 21	vs. (W5) Ole Miss; Second Round	W 69–52	24–6	Georgia Dome; Atlanta, GA
March 12, 2005; 12:00 p.m.	(W1) No. 21	vs. (E2) No. 16 Florida; Semifinals	L 62–68	24–7	Georgia Dome; Atlanta, GA
NCAA tournament
March 16, 2005*; 2:40 pm	(5) No. 21	vs. (12) Milwaukee; First round	L 73–83	24–8	Wolstein Center; Cleveland, OH
*Non-conference game. ^{#}Rankings from AP Poll. (#) Tournament seedings in parentheses. All times are in Central Time.

== See also ==
- 2005 NCAA Division I men's basketball tournament
- 2004–05 NCAA Division I men's basketball season
- 2004–05 NCAA Division I men's basketball rankings
