= 2004–05 Florida Gators men's basketball team =

American college basketball season

2004–05 Florida Gators men's basketball

SEC Tournament champions

NCAA tournament, Round of 32
- Conference: Southeastern Conference
- East

Ranking
- Coaches: No. 24
- AP: No. 16
- Record: 24–8 (12–4 SEC)
- Head coach: Billy Donovan
- Assistant coach: Anthony Grant; Donnie Jones; Larry Shyatt
- Home arena: O'Connell Center

2004–05 Southeastern Conference men's basketball standings
	Conf.				Overall
Team	W		L	PCT	W		L	PCT
East
No. 7 Kentucky	14	–	2	.875	28	–	6	.824
No. 16 Florida †	12	–	4	.750	24	–	8	.750
Vanderbilt	8	–	8	.500	20	–	14	.588
South Carolina	7	–	9	.438	20	–	13	.606
Tennessee	6	–	10	.375	14	–	17	.452
Georgia	2	–	14	.125	8	–	20	.286
West
No. 21 Alabama	12	–	4	.750	24	–	8	.750
LSU	12	–	4	.750	20	–	10	.667
Mississippi State	9	–	7	.563	23	–	11	.676
Arkansas	6	–	10	.375	18	–	12	.600
Ole Miss	4	–	12	.250	14	–	17	.452
Auburn	4	–	12	.250	14	–	17	.452
† 2005 SEC tournament winner Rankings from AP Poll

The 2004–05 Florida Gators men's basketball team represented the University of Florida in the sport of basketball during the 2004–05 college basketball season. The Gators competed in Division I of the National Collegiate Athletic Association (NCAA) and the Eastern Division of the Southeastern Conference (SEC). They were led by head coach Billy Donovan, and played their home games in the O'Connell Center on the university's Gainesville, Florida campus.

The Gators finished the regular season with a 20–7 record and entered the SEC Tournament. They swept through the SEC Tournament, beating Kentucky in the final. They then entered NCAA Tournament. They beat Ohio University in the first round 67–62. The Gators then played Villanova University in the second round and lost 76–65.

== Roster ==
Name	Number	Position	Height	Weight	Class	Hometown
Jack Berry	22	G	6-6	215	Freshman	Windermere, Florida
Corey Brewer	2	G/F	6-8	185	Freshman	Portland, Tennessee
Taurean Green	11	G	6-0	177	Freshman	Ft. Lauderdale, Florida
Al Horford	42	F/C	6-8	235	Freshman	Grand Ledge, Michigan
Lee Humphrey	12	G	6-2	192	Sophomore	Maryville, Tennessee
Cornelius Ingram	10	G	6-4	206	Freshman	Hawthorne, Florida
David Lee	24	F	6-9	240	Senior	St. Louis, Missouri
Adrian Moss	4	F	6-9	247	Junior	Houston, Texas
Joakim Noah	13	F/C	6-11	227	Freshman	New York City
Chris Richard	32	F	6-8	255	Sophomore	Lakeland, Florida
Anthony Roberson	1	G	6-2	180	Junior	Saginaw, Michigan
Matt Walsh	44	F	6-6	205	Junior	Holland, Pennsylvania

=== Coaches ===
Name	Type	College	Graduating year
Billy Donovan	Head coach	Providence	1987
Anthony Grant	Associate head coach	Dayton	1987
Donnie Jones	Assistant coach	Pikeville College	1988
Larry Shyatt	Assistant coach	College of Wooster	1973
Nate Dixon	Assistant to the head coach	UNC-Wilmington	1994
Darren Hertz	Video coordinator	Florida	1997
Adam Beaupre	Video coordinator	Florida	1999
Matt Herring	Strength and conditioning coordinator	University of Texas Southwestern	1994
Dave Werner	Athletic trainer	Eastern Kentucky University	1991
Tom Williams	Academic Counselor		

== Schedule and results ==
Date time, TV	Rank^{#}	Opponent^{#}	Result	Record	Site city, state
November 19, 2004*; 4:00 pm, FSN	No. 23	at Jacksonville	W 81–59	1–0	Veterans Memorial Arena; Jacksonville, Florida
November 23, 2004*; 7:00 pm, FSN	No. 23	Florida Atlantic	W 90–45	2–0	O'Connell Center; Gainesville, Florida
November 27, 2004*; 7:00 pm, FSN	No. 23	Providence; Orange Bowl Basketball Classic	W 84–66	3–0	O'Connell Center; Gainesville, Florida
November 30, 2004*; 7:00 pm, FSN	No. 19	Florida A&M	W 88–51	4–0	O'Connell Center; Gainesville, Florida
December 4, 2004*; 8:00 pm	No. 19	Miami (FL)	L 65–72	4–1	O'Connell Center; Gainesville, Florida
December 8, 2004*; 8:00 pm, FSN		Stetson	W 93–54	5–1	O'Connell Center; Gainesville, Florida
December 11, 2004*; 7:00 pm, ESPN2		No. 13 Louisville	L 70–74	5–2	O'Connell Center; Gainesville, Florida
December 19, 2004*; 7:00 pm, FSN		Georgia Southern	W 100–68	6–2	O'Connell Center; Gainesville, Florida
December 22, 2004*; 9:00 pm, Sun		Eastern Kentucky	W 98–49	7–2	O'Connell Center; Gainesville, Florida
December 29, 2004*; 6:30 pm, Sun		Sam Houston State	W 83–52	8–2	O'Connell Center; Gainesville, Florida
January 2, 2005*; 7:00 pm, ESPN2		at Florida State	L 69–82	8–3	Donald L. Tucker Center; Tallahassee, Florida
January 8, 2005; 7:00 pm, FSN		Arkansas	W 82–74	9–3 (1–0)	O'Connell Center; Gainesville, Florida
January 12, 2005; 7:00 pm, CBS		at Auburn	W 84–78	10–3 (2–0)	Beard–Eaves–Memorial Coliseum; Auburn, AL
January 15, 2005; 3:00 pm, FSN		at Vanderbilt	W 82–65	11–3 (3–0)	Memorial Gymnasium; Nashville, Tennessee
January 9, 2010; 12:00 pm, ESPN		Tennessee	L 76–83	11–4 (3–1)	O'Connell Center; Gainesville, Florida
January 25, 2005; 9:00 pm, FSN		Georgia	W 70–47	12–4 (4–1)	O'Connell Center; Gainesville, Florida
January 29, 2005; 8:00 pm, FSN		South Carolina	W 80–72	13–4 (5–1)	O'Connell Center; Gainesville, Florida
February 1, 2005; 9:00 pm, ESPN		at Mississippi State	L 57–71	13–5 (5–2)	Humphrey Coliseum; Starkville, Mississippi
February 5, 2005; 6:00 pm, Sun		No. 11 Alabama	W 85–54	14–5 (6–2)	O'Connell Center; Gainesville, Florida
February 8, 2005; 7:00 pm, ESPN		at No. 5 Kentucky	L 66–69	14–6 (6–3)	Rupp Arena; Lexington, Kentucky
February 12, 2005; 1:00 pm, CBS		at Tennessee	W 84–73	15–6 (7–3)	Thompson–Boling Arena; Knoxville, Tennessee
February 16, 2005; 7:00 pm, FSN		Ole Miss	W 90–53	16–6 (8–3)	O'Connell Center; Gainesville, Florida
February 19, 2005; 1:30 pm, SECN		at LSU	L 73–77	16–7 (8–4)	Maravich Assembly Center; Baton Rouge, Louisiana
February 23, 2005; 8:00 pm, SECN		Vanderbilt	W 69–61	17–7 (9–4)	O'Connell Center; Gainesville, Florida
February 27, 2005; 6:00 pm, CBS		at South Carolina	W 66–65	18–7 (10-4)	Colonial Life Arena; Columbia, South Carolina
March 2, 2005; 7:00 pm, SECN		at Georgia	W 50–38	19–7 (11–4)	Stegeman Coliseum; Athens, Georgia
March 6, 2005; 12:00 pm, CBS		No. 3 Kentucky	W 53–52	20–7 (12–4)	O'Connell Center; Gainesville, Florida
SEC tournament
March 11, 2005; 7:30 pm, SECN	(E2)	vs. (W3) Mississippi State; Quarterfinals	W 80–64	21–7	Georgia Dome; Atlanta
March 12, 2005; 7:30 pm, ESPN	(E2)	vs. (W1) No. 20 Alabama; Semifinals	W 68–62	22–7	Georgia Dome; Atlanta
March 12, 2005; 7:30 pm, ESPN	(E2)	vs. (E1) No. 4 Kentucky; SEC Championship Game	W 70–53	23–7	Georgia Dome; Atlanta
NCAA tournament
March 18, 2005; 12:20 pm, CBS	(4 S) No. 16	vs. (13 S) Ohio; First Round	W 67–62	24–7	Bridgestone Arena; Nashville, Tennessee
March 20, 2005; 4:30 pm, CBS	(4 S) No. 16	vs. (5 S) No. 19 Villanova; Second Round	L 65–76	24–8	Bridgestone Arena; Nashville, Tennessee
Tournament seedings in parentheses.
*Non-conference game. ^{#}Rankings from AP Poll. (#) Tournament seedings in parentheses. All times are in Eastern Time.
