= 2004–05 Kentucky Wildcats men's basketball team =

2004–05 season of University of Kentucky men's basketball team

2004–05 Kentucky Wildcats men's basketball

SEC regular season champions

NCAA tournament, Elite Eight
- Conference: Southeastern Conference
- Eastern

Ranking
- Coaches: No. 5
- AP: No. 7
- Record: 28–6 (14–2 SEC)
- Head coach: Tubby Smith (8th season)
- Assistant coaches: David Hobbs; Scott Rigot; Reggie Hanson
- Home arena: Rupp Arena

2004–05 Southeastern Conference men's basketball standings
	Conf.				Overall
Team	W		L	PCT	W		L	PCT
East
No. 7 Kentucky	14	–	2	.875	28	–	6	.824
No. 16 Florida †	12	–	4	.750	24	–	8	.750
Vanderbilt	8	–	8	.500	20	–	14	.588
South Carolina	7	–	9	.438	20	–	13	.606
Tennessee	6	–	10	.375	14	–	17	.452
Georgia	2	–	14	.125	8	–	20	.286
West
No. 21 Alabama	12	–	4	.750	24	–	8	.750
LSU	12	–	4	.750	20	–	10	.667
Mississippi State	9	–	7	.563	23	–	11	.676
Arkansas	6	–	10	.375	18	–	12	.600
Ole Miss	4	–	12	.250	14	–	17	.452
Auburn	4	–	12	.250	14	–	17	.452
† 2005 SEC tournament winner Rankings from AP Poll

The 2004–05 Kentucky Wildcats men's basketball team represented University of Kentucky. The head coach was Tubby Smith. The team was a member of the Southeast Conference and played their home games at Rupp Arena. For the season the Kentucky finished with an overall record of 28–6 (14–2 SEC).

In the 2005 NCAA Tournament the Wildcats advanced all the way to the Elite 8. In the opening round Kentucky defeated Eastern Kentucky 72–64. The second round Kentucky took care of Cincinnati 69–60 and in the Sweet Sixteen easily defeated Utah 62–52. But their season came to an end with a tough loss to Michigan State in double overtime 94–89.

== Roster ==
2004–05 Kentucky Wildcats men's basketball team
Players
Coaches
Walk-On

Pos.	#	Name	Height	Weight	Year	Hometown
G	1	Brandon Stockton	6 ft 2 in (1.88 m)	190 lb (86 kg)	Jr	Glasgow, KY
G	2	Ravi Moss	6 ft 2 in (1.88 m)	190 lb (86 kg)	Jr	Hopkinsville, KY
G	11	Eric Allen	6 ft 4 in (1.93 m)	170 lb (77 kg)	Fr	Decatur, AL
G	4	Rajon Rondo	6 ft 1 in (1.85 m)	175 lb (79 kg)	Fr	Louisville, KY
G	5	Josh Carrier	6 ft 4 in (1.93 m)	205 lb (93 kg)	Sr	Bowling Green, KY
C	10	Łukasz Obrzut	7 ft 1 in (2.16 m)	265 lb (120 kg)	So	Gliwice, PO
G	12	Preston LeMaster	6 ft 2 in (1.88 m)	180 lb (82 kg)	Jr	Paris, KY
F	13	Bobby Perry	6 ft 6 in (1.98 m)	215 lb (98 kg)	So	Durham, NC
C	21	Shagari Alleyne	7 ft 3 in (2.21 m)	270 lb (122 kg)	So	New York, NY
G	22	Patrick Sparks	6 ft 0 in (1.83 m)	180 lb (82 kg)	RS Jr	Central City, KY
F	23	Sheray Thomas	6 ft 8 in (2.03 m)	240 lb (109 kg)	So	Montreal, QB
F	24	Kelenna Azubuike	6 ft 5 in (1.96 m)	220 lb (100 kg)	Jr	Tulsa, OK
F	44	Chuck Hayes	6 ft 6 in (1.98 m)	240 lb (109 kg)	Sr	Modesto, CA
C	33	Randolph Morris	6 ft 10 in (2.08 m)	266 lb (121 kg)	Fr	Atlanta, GA
G	32	Joe Crawford	6 ft 5 in (1.96 m)	210 lb (95 kg)	Fr	Detroit, MI

Head coach

- Tubby Smith

Assistant coach(es)

- David Hobbs
- Scott Rigot
- Reggie Hanson

Legend

- (C) Team captain
- (S) Suspended
- (I) Ineligible
- (W) Walk-on
- Injured
- Current redshirt

== Schedule and results ==
Date time, TV	Rank^{#}	Opponent^{#}	Result	Record	Site (attendance) city, state
Non-conference regular season
November 20, 2005*; 4:00 pm, UKTV	No. 9	Coppin State	W 77–46	1–0	Rupp Arena (22,231); Lexington, KY
November 23, 2004*; 7:00 pm, UKTV	No. 8	vs. Ball State	W 73–53	2–0	US Bank Arena (15,563); Cincinnati, OH
November 26, 2004*; 7:00 pm, UKTV	No. 8	Georgia State	W 77–59	3–0	Rupp Arena (22,368); Lexington, KY
November 30, 2004*; 7:00 pm, UKTV	No. 8	Tennessee Tech	W 92–63	4–0	Rupp Arena (22,368); Lexington, KY
December 4, 2004*; 12:00 pm, CBS	No. 8	at No. 9 North Carolina	L 78–91	4–1	Dean Smith Center (21,750); Chapel Hill, NC
December 8, 2004*; 7:00 pm, UKTV	No. 10	Morehead State	W 71–40	5–1	Rupp Arena (20,652); Lexington, KY
December 11, 2004*; 2:00 pm, CBS	No. 10	vs. Indiana	W 73–58	6–1	Freedom Hall (20,084); Louisville, KY
December 18, 2004*; 12:00 pm, ESPN	No. 9	at No. 13 Louisville; Battle for the Bluegrass	W 60–58	7–1	Freedom Hall (20,088); Louisville, KY
December 22, 2004*; 7:00 pm, UKTV	No. 8	William & Mary	W 92–47	8–1	Rupp Arena (18,059); Lexington, KY
December 29, 2004*; 7:00 pm, UKTV	No. 8	Campbell	W 82–50	9–1	Rupp Arena (22,411); Lexington, KY
SEC Regular Season
January 5, 2005; 8:00 pm, JP Sports	No. 8	South Carolina	W 79–75	10–1 (1-0)	Rupp Arena (22,782); Lexington, KY
January 9, 2005*; 4:00 pm, CBS	No. 8	No. 2 Kansas	L 59–65	10–2	Rupp Arena (24,367); Lexington, KY
January 12, 2005; 7:00 pm, FSN	No. 9	Vanderbilt	W 69–54	11–2 (2-0)	Rupp Arena (22,174); Lexington, KY
January 15, 2005; 1:00 pm, JP Sports	No. 9	at Georgia	W 76–55	12–2 (3-0)	Stegeman Coliseum (9,014); Athens, GA
January 19, 2005; 8:00 pm, JP Sports	No. 8	at Ole Miss	W 53–50	13–2 (4-0)	Tad Smith Coliseum (8,451); Oxford, MS
January 22, 2005; 1:30 pm, CBS	No. 8	LSU	W 89–58	14–2 (5-0)	Rupp Arena (23,073); Lexington, KY
January 25, 2005; 9:00 pm, ESPN	No. 7	at Tennessee	W 84–62	15–2 (6-0)	Thompson-Boling Arena (16,183); Knoxville, TN
January 29, 2005; 3:30 pm, CBS	No. 7	at Arkansas	W 68–67	16–2 (7-0)	Bud Walton Arena (20,268); Fayetteville, AR
February 5, 2005; 3:00 pm, JP Sports	No. 6	at Vanderbilt	W 84–70	17–2 (8-0)	Memorial Gymnasium (14,316); Nashville, TN
February 8, 2005; 9:00 pm, ESPN	No. 5	Florida	W 69–66	18–2 (9-0)	Rupp Arena (24,191); Lexington, KY
February 12, 2005; 3:00 pm, JP Sports	No. 5	Georgia	W 60–51	19–2 (10-0)	Rupp Arena (23,897); Lexington, KY
February 15, 2005; 9:00 pm, ESPN	No. 3	at South Carolina	L 61–73	19–3 (10-1)	Colonial Center (16,107); Columbia, SC
February 19, 2005; 9:00 pm, ESPN	No. 3	Mississippi State; ESPN College GameDay	W 94–78	20–3 (11-1)	Rupp Arena (24,247); Lexington, KY
February 23, 2005; 8:00 pm, JP Sports	No. 5	Auburn	W 81–73	21–3 (12-1)	Rupp Arena (23,063); Lexington, KY
February 26, 2005; 1:30 pm, CBS	No. 5	Alabama	W 78–71	22–3 (13-1)	Coleman Coliseum (15,316); Tuscaloosa, AL
March 2, 2005; 8:00 pm, JP Sports	No. 3	Tennessee	W 73–61	23–3 (14-1)	Rupp Arena (24,205); Lexington, KY
March 6, 2005; 12:00 pm, CBS	No. 3	at Florida	L 52–53	23–4 (14-2)	O'Connell Center (12,602); Gainesville, FL
2005 SEC Tournament
March 11, 2005; 9:30 pm, JP Sports	(E1) No. 4	vs. (E5) Tennessee; Quarterfinals	W 76–62	24–4	Georgia Dome (22,024); Atlanta, GA
March 12, 2005; 3:30 pm, JP Sports	(E1) No. 4	vs. (W2) LSU; Semifinals	W 79–78 ^{OT}	25–4	Georgia Dome (24,214); Atlanta, GA
March 13, 2005; 1:30 pm, CBS	(E1) No. 4	vs. (E2) No. 16 Florida; Championship	L 53–70	25–5	Georgia Dome (24,408); Atlanta, GA
2005 NCAA Tournament
March 17, 2005; 12:45 pm, CBS	(2 A) No. 7	vs. (15 A) Eastern Kentucky; First Round	W 72–64	26–5	RCA Dome (27,284); Indianapolis, IN
March 19, 2005; 8:30 pm, CBS	(2 A) No. 7	vs. (7 A) No. 23 Cincinnati; Second Round	W 69–60	27–5	RCA Dome (40,331); Indianapolis, IN
March 25, 2005; 9:30 pm, CBS	(2 A) No. 7	vs. (6 A) No. 18 Utah; Sweet Sixteen	W 62–52	28–5	Frank Erwin Center (16,239); Austin, TX
March 27, 2005; 3:00 pm, CBS	(2 A) No. 7	vs. (5 A) No. 15 Michigan State; Elite Eight	L 88–94 ^{2OT}	28–6	Frank Erwin Center (16,239); Austin, TX
*Non-conference game. ^{#}Rankings from AP Poll. (#) Tournament seedings in parentheses. A=Austin Regional.
