= 2004–05 Arkansas Razorbacks men's basketball team =

American college basketball season

2004–05 Arkansas Razorbacks men's basketball
- Conference: Southeastern Conference
- West
- Record: 18–12 (6–10 SEC)
- Head coach: Stan Heath (3rd season)
- Home arena: Bud Walton Arena

2004–05 Southeastern Conference men's basketball standings
| | Conf. | | | | Overall |
| Team | W | | L | PCT | W | | L | PCT |
|---|---|---|---|---|---|---|---|---|
East
| No. 7 Kentucky | 14 | – | 2 | .875 | 28 | – | 6 | .824 |
| No. 16 Florida † | 12 | – | 4 | .750 | 24 | – | 8 | .750 |
| Vanderbilt | 8 | – | 8 | .500 | 20 | – | 14 | .588 |
| South Carolina | 7 | – | 9 | .438 | 20 | – | 13 | .606 |
| Tennessee | 6 | – | 10 | .375 | 14 | – | 17 | .452 |
| Georgia | 2 | – | 14 | .125 | 8 | – | 20 | .286 |
West
| No. 21 Alabama | 12 | – | 4 | .750 | 24 | – | 8 | .750 |
| LSU | 12 | – | 4 | .750 | 20 | – | 10 | .667 |
| Mississippi State | 9 | – | 7 | .563 | 23 | – | 11 | .676 |
| Arkansas | 6 | – | 10 | .375 | 18 | – | 12 | .600 |
| Ole Miss | 4 | – | 12 | .250 | 14 | – | 17 | .452 |
| Auburn | 4 | – | 12 | .250 | 14 | – | 17 | .452 |
† 2005 SEC tournament winner Rankings from AP Poll

The 2004–05 Arkansas Razorbacks men's basketball team represented the University of Arkansas in the 2004–05 college basketball season. The head coach was Stan Heath, serving for his third year. The team played its home games in Bud Walton Arena in Fayetteville, Arkansas.

== Schedule ==
| Date time, TV | Rank^{#} | Opponent^{#} | Result | Record | Site (attendance) city, state |
|---|---|---|---|---|---|
| 11/19/04*; 7:00 pm | | vs. Winthrop; Paradise Jam | W 72–49 | 1–0 | Sports and Fitness Center (1,287); St. Thomas, VI |
| 11/21/04*; 7:00 pm | | vs. Troy State; Paradise Jam | W 89–54 | 2–0 | Sports and Fitness Center (2,019); St. Thomas, VI |
| 11/22/04*; 7:00 pm, FSN | | Eastern Michigan; Paradise Jam | W 82–64 | 3–0 | Sports and Fitness Center (3,014); St. Thomas, VI |
| 11/27/04*; 2:05 pm | | Gardner-Webb | W 79–63 | 4–0 | Bud Walton Arena (10,343); Fayetteville, Arkansas |
| 11/30/04*; 7:05 pm, FSN | | Tulsa | W 85–73 | 5–0 | Bud Walton Arena (16,603); Fayetteville, Arkansas |
| 12/4/04*; 1:00 pm, ESPN | | No. 5 Illinois | L 60–72 | 5–1 | Alltel Arena (13,140); Little Rock, Arkansas |
| 12/7/04*; 7:00 pm, ARSN | | at Missouri | W 62–52 | 6–1 | Mizzou Arena (10,086); Columbia, Missouri |
| 12/16/04*; 7:05 pm, ARSN | | Tennessee State | W 96–68 | 7–1 | Bud Walton Arena (14,358); Fayetteville, Arkansas |
| 12/18/04*; 12:35 pm, ARSN | | Prairie View A&M | W 102–50 | 8–1 | Bud Walton Arena (11,648); Fayetteville, Arkansas |
| 12/20/04*; 7:05 pm | | Lipscomb | W 83–54 | 9–1 | Bud Walton Arena (11,289); Fayetteville, Arkansas |
| 12/23/04*; 7:05 pm, ARSN | | Hartford | W 87–55 | 10–1 | Bud Walton Arena (10,321); Fayetteville, Arkansas |
| 12/29/04*; 7:05 pm, ARSN | | Jacksonville State | W 73–67 | 11–1 | Bud Walton Arena (15,924); Fayetteville, Arkansas |
| 12/31/04*; 7:05 pm, ARSN | | Louisiana-Monroe | W 85–43 | 12–1 | Bud Walton Arena (14,205); Fayetteville, Arkansas |
| 1/5/05; 7:05 pm | | Mississippi | W 69–46 | 13–1 | Bud Walton Arena (18,016); Fayetteville, Arkansas |
| 1/8/05; 11:00 am, JP Sports | | at Florida | L 74–82 | 13–2 | O'Connell Center (11,021); Gainesville, Florida |
| 1/11/05; 8:05 pm, ESPN | | No. 21 Alabama | L 61–64 | 13–3 | Bud Walton Arena (18,533); Fayetteville, Arkansas |
| 1/15/05; 2:00 pm | | at No. 11 Mississippi State | L 55–80 | 13–4 | Humphrey Coliseum (9,636); Starkville, Mississippi |
| 1/19/05; 7:00 pm | | at LSU | L 63–66 ^{OT} | 13–5 | Maravich Assembly Center (9,577); Baton Rouge, Louisiana |
| 1/22/05; 1:05 pm, JP Sports | | Auburn | W 95–59 | 14–5 | Bud Walton Arena (19,162); Fayetteville, Arkansas |
| 1/29/05; 2:30 pm, CBS | | No. 6 Kentucky | L 67–68 | 14–6 | Bud Walton Arena (20,268); Fayetteville, Arkansas |
| 2/2/05; 6:30 pm | | at South Carolina | L 52–64 | 14–7 | Colonial Life Arena (10,010); Columbia, South Carolina |
| 2/5/05; 4:00 pm, FSN | | at Mississippi | W 66–65 | 15–7 | Tad Smith Coliseum (5,474); Oxford, Mississippi |
| 2/9/05; 7:05 pm, JP Sports | | Georgia | W 62–47 | 16–7 | Bud Walton Arena (16,234); Fayetteville, Arkansas |
| 2/12/05; 2:05 pm, JP Sports | | LSU | W 65–62 | 17–7 | Bud Walton Arena (20,273); Fayetteville, Arkansas |
| 2/16/05; 7:00 pm, JP Sports | | at No. 16 Alabama | L 63–72 | 17–8 | Coleman Coliseum (9,410); Tuscaloosa, AL |
| 2/19/05; 6:00 pm, FSN | | at Vanderbilt | L 65–79 | 17–9 | Memorial Gymnasium (13,577); Nashville, Tennessee |
| 2/26/05; 3:05 pm, JP Sports | | Tennessee | W 70–68 | 18–9 | Bud Walton Arena (19,084); Fayetteville, Arkansas |
| 3/1/05; 6:05 pm, ESPN | | Mississippi State | L 55–57 | 18–10 | Bud Walton Arena (16,347); Fayetteville, Arkansas |
| 3/5/05; 1:00 pm, JP Sports | | at Auburn | L 64–77 | 18–11 | Beard-Eaves-Memorial Coliseum (4,134); Auburn, AL |
2005 SEC men's basketball tournament
| 3/10/05; 6:30 pm, JP Sports | | vs. Tennessee | L 46–65 | 18–12 | Georgia Dome (N/A); Atlanta |
*Non-conference game. ^{#}Rankings from AP Poll. (#) Tournament seedings in parentheses. All times are in EST.
