= 2004–05 LSU Tigers basketball team =

American college basketball season

2004–05 LSU Tigers basketball

SEC West co-champions

NCAA tournament, first round
- Conference: Southeastern Conference
- Record: 20–10 (12–4 SEC)
- Head coach: John Brady (8th season)
- Home arena: Pete Maravich Assembly Center

2004–05 Southeastern Conference men's basketball standings
| | Conf. | | | | Overall |
| Team | W | | L | PCT | W | | L | PCT |
|---|---|---|---|---|---|---|---|---|
East
| No. 7 Kentucky | 14 | – | 2 | .875 | 28 | – | 6 | .824 |
| No. 16 Florida † | 12 | – | 4 | .750 | 24 | – | 8 | .750 |
| Vanderbilt | 8 | – | 8 | .500 | 20 | – | 14 | .588 |
| South Carolina | 7 | – | 9 | .438 | 20 | – | 13 | .606 |
| Tennessee | 6 | – | 10 | .375 | 14 | – | 17 | .452 |
| Georgia | 2 | – | 14 | .125 | 8 | – | 20 | .286 |
West
| No. 21 Alabama | 12 | – | 4 | .750 | 24 | – | 8 | .750 |
| LSU | 12 | – | 4 | .750 | 20 | – | 10 | .667 |
| Mississippi State | 9 | – | 7 | .563 | 23 | – | 11 | .676 |
| Arkansas | 6 | – | 10 | .375 | 18 | – | 12 | .600 |
| Ole Miss | 4 | – | 12 | .250 | 14 | – | 17 | .452 |
| Auburn | 4 | – | 12 | .250 | 14 | – | 17 | .452 |
† 2005 SEC tournament winner Rankings from AP Poll

The 2004–05 LSU Tigers basketball team represented Louisiana State University in the Southeastern Conference (SEC) during the 2004–05 NCAA Division I men's basketball season. The team was coached by John Brady and played their home games at Pete Maravich Assembly Center in Baton Rouge, Louisiana.

== Roster ==
2004–05 LSU Tigers men's basketball team
Players
Coaches

| Pos. | # | Name | Height | Weight | Year | Hometown |
|---|---|---|---|---|---|---|
| F | 1 | Tasmin Mitchell | 6 ft 7 in (2.01 m) | 240 lb (109 kg) | Fr | Baton Rouge, Louisiana |
| F | 0 | Glen Davis | 6 ft 9 in (2.06 m) | 310 lb (141 kg) | Fr | Baton Rouge, Louisiana |
| G | 10 | David Fleshman | 6 ft 0 in (1.83 m) | 180 lb (82 kg) | Fr | Baton Rouge, Louisiana |
| F | 35 | Darnell Lazare | 6 ft 8 in (2.03 m) | 229 lb (104 kg) | So | Baton Rouge, Louisiana |
| G | 2 | Dameon Mason | 6 ft 5 in (1.96 m) | 190 lb (86 kg) | So | Aurora, Illinois |
| G | 3 | Tack Minor | 5 ft 11 in (1.8 m) | 200 lb (91 kg) | So | Houston, Texas |
| G | 22 | Darrel Mitchell | 5 ft 11 in (1.8 m) | 176 lb (80 kg) | Jr | Saint Martinville, Louisiana |
| F | 30 | Brandon Bass | 6 ft 8 in (2.03 m) | 240 lb (109 kg) | So | Baton Rouge, Louisiana |

Head coach

- John Brady (Belhaven)

Assistant coach(es)

- Nikita Johnson (West Georgia)
- Butch Pierre (Mississippi State)
- John Treloar (Belhaven)

Legend

- (C) Team captain
- (S) Suspended
- (I) Ineligible
- (W) Walk-on
- Injured
- Current redshirt

Roster

== Schedule and results ==
| Date time, TV | Rank^{#} | Opponent^{#} | Result | Record | Site (attendance) city, state |
Regular season
| Nov 19, 2004* | | Tulane | W 83–58 | 1–0 | Maravich Assembly Center; Baton Rouge, Louisiana |
| Nov 21, 2004* | | Louisiana-Lafayette | W 83–69 | 2–0 | Maravich Assembly Center; Baton Rouge, Louisiana |
| Nov 24, 2004* | | New Orleans | W 95–79 | 3–0 | Maravich Assembly Center; Baton Rouge, Louisiana |
| Nov 27, 2004* | | West Virginia | L 69–84 | 3–1 | Maravich Assembly Center; Baton Rouge, Louisiana |
| Dec 11, 2004* | | Northwestern State | W 83–74 | 4–1 | Maravich Assembly Center; Baton Rouge, Louisiana |
| Dec 13, 2004* | | McNeese State | W 82–79 | 5–1 | Maravich Assembly Center; Baton Rouge, Louisiana |
| Dec 18, 2004* | | vs. Southern Miss | L 84–88 ^{OT} | 5–2 | Mississippi Coast Coliseum; Biloxi, Mississippi |
| Dec 21, 2004* | | at Houston | L 72–81 | 5–3 | Hofheinz Pavilion; Houston, Texas |
| Dec 30, 2004* | | vs. Florida State | W 67–50 | 6–3 | New Orleans Arena; New Orleans, Louisiana |
| Jan 3, 2005* | | at Utah | L 55–69 | 6–4 | Jon M. Huntsman Center; Salt Lake City, Utah |
| Jan 8, 2005 | | at No. 19 Alabama | L 58–73 | 6–5 (0–1) | Coleman Coliseum; Tuscaloosa, Alabama |
| Jan 12, 2005 | | South Carolina | W 79–64 | 7–5 (1–1) | Maravich Assembly Center; Baton Rouge, Louisiana |
| Jan 15, 2005* | | Ohio State | W 113–101 ^{2OT} | 8–5 | Maravich Assembly Center; Baton Rouge, Louisiana |
| Jan 19, 2005 | | Arkansas | W 66–63 ^{OT} | 9–5 (2–1) | Maravich Assembly Center; Baton Rouge, Louisiana |
| Jan 22, 2005 | | at No. 8 Kentucky | L 58–89 | 9–6 (2–2) | Rupp Arena; Lexington, Kentucky |
| Mar 5, 2005 | | Vanderbilt | W 81–69 | 19–8 (12–4) | Maravich Assembly Center; Baton Rouge, Louisiana |
SEC Tournament
| Mar 11, 2005* | | vs. Auburn; Quarterfinals | W 89–58 | 20–8 | Georgia Dome; Atlanta, Georgia |
| Mar 12, 2005* | | vs. No. 4 Kentucky; Semifinals | L 78–79 ^{OT} | 20–9 | Georgia Dome; Atlanta, Georgia |
NCAA Tournament
| Mar 17, 2005* | (6 CHI) | vs. (11 CHI) UAB; First Round | L 68–82 | 20–10 | Taco Bell Arena; Boise, Idaho |
*Non-conference game. ^{#}Rankings from AP Poll, NCAA tournament seeds shown in parentheses. (#) Tournament seedings in parentheses. All times are in Central Standard Time.

== NBA draft ==
| Round | Pick | Player | NBA club |
|---|---|---|---|
| 2 | 33 | Brandon Bass | New Orleans Hornets |
