= 2004–05 Mississippi State Bulldogs men's basketball team =

American college basketball season

2004–05 Mississippi State Bulldogs men's basketball

NCAA tournament, second round
- Conference: Southeastern Conference
- Record: 23–11 (9–7 SEC)
- Head coach: Rick Stansbury (7th season)
- Assistant coaches: Phil Cunningham; Robert Kirby; Mark White
- Home arena: Humphrey Coliseum

2004–05 Southeastern Conference men's basketball standings
	Conf.				Overall
Team	W		L	PCT	W		L	PCT
East
No. 7 Kentucky	14	–	2	.875	28	–	6	.824
No. 16 Florida †	12	–	4	.750	24	–	8	.750
Vanderbilt	8	–	8	.500	20	–	14	.588
South Carolina	7	–	9	.438	20	–	13	.606
Tennessee	6	–	10	.375	14	–	17	.452
Georgia	2	–	14	.125	8	–	20	.286
West
No. 21 Alabama	12	–	4	.750	24	–	8	.750
LSU	12	–	4	.750	20	–	10	.667
Mississippi State	9	–	7	.563	23	–	11	.676
Arkansas	6	–	10	.375	18	–	12	.600
Ole Miss	4	–	12	.250	14	–	17	.452
Auburn	4	–	12	.250	14	–	17	.452
† 2005 SEC tournament winner Rankings from AP Poll

The 2004–05 Mississippi State basketball team represented Mississippi State University as a member of the Southeastern Conference during the 2004–05 college basketball season. Under seventh-year head coach Rick Stansbury, the team played their home games at Humphrey Coliseum in Starkville, Mississippi. Mississippi State finished third in the SEC West Division regular season standings. The Bulldogs were knocked out in the quarterfinal round of the SEC tournament, losing to Florida. The team received an at-large bid to the NCAA tournament as No. 9 seed in the Austin region. After an opening round win over No. 8 seed Stanford, the Bulldogs were defeated by No. 1 seed Duke. Mississippi State finished the season with a record of 23–11 (9–7 SEC).

== Roster ==
2004–05 Mississippi State Bulldogs men's basketball team
Players
Coaches

Pos.	#	Name	Height	Weight	Year	Previous school	Hometown
G	0	Gary Ervin	6 ft 0 in (1.83 m)	182 lb (83 kg)	So		Brooklyn, NY
PF	4	Lawrence Roberts	6 ft 9 in (2.06 m)	240 lb (109 kg)	Sr	Baylor	Houston, TX
G	22	Dietric Slater	6 ft 3 in (1.91 m)	195 lb (88 kg)	So	Wayne County HS	Waynesboro, MS
F	23	Charles Rhodes	6 ft 8 in (2.03 m)	245 lb (111 kg)	Fr		Jackson, MS
F	41	Piotr Stelmach	6 ft 9 in (2.06 m)	240 lb (109 kg)	So	SMS Warka	Kamien Pomorski, Poland
PF	42	Walter Sharpe	6 ft 9 in (2.06 m)	245 lb (111 kg)	Fr		Birmingham, AL

Head coach

- Rick Stansbury (Campbellsville)

Assistant coach(es)

- Phil Cunningham (Campbellsville)
- Robert Kirby (UTPA)
- Mark White (Austin Peay)

Legend

- (C) Team captain
- (S) Suspended
- (I) Ineligible
- (W) Walk-on
- Injured
- Current redshirt

Roster

== Schedule and results ==
Date time, TV	Rank^{#}	Opponent^{#}	Result	Record	Site city, state
Non-conference Regular season
Nov 11, 2004*	No. 12	vs. Fairfield	W 53–49	1–0	Birmingham-Jefferson Civic Center; Birmingham, Alabama
Nov 18, 2004*	No. 12	vs. No. 5 Syracuse	L 58–71	2–1	Madison Square Garden; New York, New York
Nov 19, 2004*	No. 12	vs. Saint Mary's	W 67–54	3–1	Madison Square Garden; New York, New York
Dec 5, 2004*	No. 15	vs. No. 21 Arizona	L 64–68	6–2	Arrowhead Pond of Anaheim; Anaheim, California
SEC Regular season
Jan 5, 2005	No. 18	Auburn	W 90–53	13–2 (1–0)	Humphrey Coliseum; Starkville, Mississippi
Jan 8, 2005*	No. 18	at Ole Miss	W 87–76	14–2 (2–0)	Tad Smith Coliseum; Oxford, Mississippi
Jan 12, 2005	No. 11	at Tennessee	L 63–64	14–3 (2–1)	Thompson-Boling Arena; Knoxville, Tennessee
Jan 15, 2005	No. 11	Arkansas	W 80–55	15–3 (3–1)	Humphrey Coliseum; Starkville, Mississippi
Jan 18, 2005	No. 17	at No. 22 Alabama	L 49–98	15–4 (3–2)	Coleman Coliseum; Tuscaloosa, Alabama
Jan 22, 2005	No. 17	South Carolina	W 73–65	16–4 (4–2)	Humphrey Coliseum; Starkville, Mississippi
Jan 29, 2005	No. 24	at LSU	L 62–69	16–5 (4–3)	Maravich Assembly Center; Baton Rouge, Louisiana
Feb 1, 2005	No. 24	Florida	W 71–57	17–5 (5–3)	Humphrey Coliseum; Starkville, Mississippi
Mar 5, 2005		No. 21 Alabama	L 63–68	21–9 (9–7)	Humphrey Coliseum; Starkville, Mississippi
SEC Tournament
Mar 10, 2005*		vs. Georgia; First Round	W 76–65	22–9	Georgia Dome; Atlanta, Georgia
Mar 11, 2005*		vs. Florida; Quarterfinals	L 64–80	22–10	Georgia Dome; Atlanta, Georgia
NCAA Tournament
Mar 18, 2005*	(9 AUS)	vs. (8 AUS) Stanford; First Round	W 93–70	23–10	Charlotte Coliseum; Charlotte, North Carolina
Mar 20, 2005*	(9 AUS)	vs. (1 AUS) No. 3 Duke; Second Round	L 55–63	23–11	Charlotte Coliseum; Charlotte, North Carolina
*Non-conference game. ^{#}Rankings from AP poll. (#) Tournament seedings in parentheses. AUS=Austin.
