= 2004–05 Ivy League men's basketball season =

The 2004–05 Ivy League men's basketball season was the Ivy League's 51st season of basketball. The team with the best record (Penn Quakers) progressed to play in the 2005 NCAA Men's Division I Basketball Tournament. It would be their 23rd NCAA tournament appearance. Tim Begley, a senior shooting guard, won the Ivy League Men's Basketball Player of the Year. He was the eleventh player from the Penn Quakers to win the award.

== Standings ==
School	Coach	W	L
Penn	Fran Dunphy	13	1
Cornell	Steve Donahue	8	6
Harvard	Frank Sullivan	7	7
Yale	James Jones	7	7
Dartmouth	Terry Dunn	7	7
Princeton	Joe Scott	6	8
Brown	Glen Miller	5	9
Columbia	Joe Jones	3	11
