= 2004–05 South Carolina Gamecocks men's basketball team =

American college basketball season

2004–05 South Carolina Gamecocks men's basketball

NIT, Champions
- Conference: Southeastern Conference
- East
- Record: 20–13 (7–9 SEC)
- Head coach: Dave Odom (4th season)
- Home arena: Colonial Center

2004–05 Southeastern Conference men's basketball standings
| | Conf. | | | | Overall |
| Team | W | | L | PCT | W | | L | PCT |
|---|---|---|---|---|---|---|---|---|
East
| No. 7 Kentucky | 14 | – | 2 | .875 | 28 | – | 6 | .824 |
| No. 16 Florida † | 12 | – | 4 | .750 | 24 | – | 8 | .750 |
| Vanderbilt | 8 | – | 8 | .500 | 20 | – | 14 | .588 |
| South Carolina | 7 | – | 9 | .438 | 20 | – | 13 | .606 |
| Tennessee | 6 | – | 10 | .375 | 14 | – | 17 | .452 |
| Georgia | 2 | – | 14 | .125 | 8 | – | 20 | .286 |
West
| No. 21 Alabama | 12 | – | 4 | .750 | 24 | – | 8 | .750 |
| LSU | 12 | – | 4 | .750 | 20 | – | 10 | .667 |
| Mississippi State | 9 | – | 7 | .563 | 23 | – | 11 | .676 |
| Arkansas | 6 | – | 10 | .375 | 18 | – | 12 | .600 |
| Ole Miss | 4 | – | 12 | .250 | 14 | – | 17 | .452 |
| Auburn | 4 | – | 12 | .250 | 14 | – | 17 | .452 |
† 2005 SEC tournament winner Rankings from AP Poll

The 2004–05 South Carolina Gamecocks men's basketball team represented the University of South Carolina as a member of the Southeastern Conference during the 2003–04 men's college basketball season. The team was led by head coach Dave Odom and played their home games at the Colonial Center in Columbia, South Carolina. The team finished fourth in the SEC East regular season standings and lost in the opening round of the SEC tournament. The Gamecocks were invited to the 2005 NIT, and defeated Miami (FL), UNLV, Georgetown, Maryland, and Saint Joseph's to win the tournament and finish the season with a record of 20–13 (7–9 SEC).

== Roster ==
2004–05 South Carolina Gamecocks men's basketball team
Players
Coaches

| Pos. | # | Name | Height | Weight | Year | Hometown |
|---|---|---|---|---|---|---|
| G | 1 | Tre' Kelley | 6 ft 1 in (1.85 m) | 185 lb (84 kg) | So | Washington, D.C. |
| F | 15 | Carlos Powell | 6 ft 7 in (2.01 m) | 220 lb (100 kg) | Sr | Florence, South Carolina |
| G | 21 | Tarence Kinsey | 6 ft 6 in (1.98 m) | 185 lb (84 kg) | Jr | Tampa, Florida |
| G | 31 | Josh Gonner | 6 ft 3 in (1.91 m) | 180 lb (82 kg) | Sr | Fort Worth, Texas |
| C | 33 | Brandon Wallace | 6 ft 10 in (2.08 m) | 200 lb (91 kg) | So | Jackson, South Carolina |
| F | 34 | Renaldo Balkman | 6 ft 8 in (2.03 m) | 205 lb (93 kg) | So | Staten Island, New York |

Head coach

- Dave Odom

Assistant coach(es)

Legend

- (C) Team captain
- (S) Suspended
- (I) Ineligible
- (W) Walk-on
- Injured
- Current redshirt

Roster

== Schedule and results ==
| Date time, TV | Rank^{#} | Opponent^{#} | Result | Record | Site city, state |
Regular season
| Nov 21, 2004* | | Western Carolina | W 87–61 | 1–0 | Colonial Center; Columbia, South Carolina |
| Nov 24, 2004* | | Winthrop | W 62–52 | 2–0 | Colonial Center; Columbia, South Carolina |
| Nov 27, 2004* | | Temple | W 60–46 | 3–0 | Colonial Center; Columbia, South Carolina |
| Dec 1, 2004* | | Appalachian State | W 91–57 | 4–0 | Colonial Center; Columbia, South Carolina |
| Dec 4, 2004* | | Clemson | L 62–63 ^{OT} | 4–1 | Colonial Center; Columbia, South Carolina |
| Dec 14, 2004* | | South Florida | W 72–70 | 5–1 | Colonial Center; Columbia, South Carolina |
| Dec 18, 2004* | | at No. 2 Kansas | L 60–64 | 5–2 | Allen Fieldhouse (16,300); Lawrence, Kansas |
| Dec 20, 2004* | | vs. East Carolina | W 57–53 | 6–2 | Mobile Civic Center; Mobile, Alabama |
| Dec 22, 2004* | | South Carolina State | W 68–65 ^{OT} | 7–2 | Colonial Center; Columbia, South Carolina |
| Dec 29, 2004* | | at No. 10 Pittsburgh | L 68–72 | 7–3 | Petersen Events Center; Pittsburgh, Pennsylvania |
| Dec 31, 2004* | | Wofford | W 76–44 | 8–3 | Colonial Center; Columbia, South Carolina |
| Jan 5, 2005 | | at No. 8 Kentucky | L 75–79 | 8–4 (0–1) | Rupp Arena; Lexington, Kentucky |
| Jan 8, 2005 | | Georgia | W 74–54 | 9–4 (1–1) | Colonial Center; Columbia, South Carolina |
| Jan 12, 2005 | | at LSU | L 64–79 | 9–5 (1–2) | Maravich Assembly Center; Baton Rouge, Louisiana |
| Jan 15, 2005 | | Tennessee | W 66–63 | 10–5 (2–2) | Colonial Center; Columbia, South Carolina |
| Jan 22, 2005 | | at No. 17 Mississippi State | L 65–73 | 10–6 (2–3) | Humphrey Coliseum; Starkville, Mississippi |
| Jan 26, 2005 | | Vanderbilt | W 68–63 | 11–6 (3–3) | Colonial Center; Columbia, South Carolina |
| Jan 29, 2005 | | at Florida | L 72–80 | 11–7 (3–4) | Stephen C. O'Connell Center; Gainesville, Florida |
| Feb 2, 2005 | | Arkansas | W 64–52 | 12–7 (4–4) | Colonial Center; Columbia, South Carolina |
| Feb 5, 2005 | | at Georgia | W 60–53 | 13–7 (5–4) | Stegeman Coliseum; Athens, Georgia |
| Feb 12, 2005 | | Auburn | L 71–74 | 13–8 (5–5) | Colonial Center; Columbia, South Carolina |
| Feb 15, 2005 | | No. 3 Kentucky | W 73–61 | 14–8 (6–5) | Colonial Center; Columbia, South Carolina |
| Feb 19, 2005 | | at No. 16 Alabama | L 68–87 | 14–9 (6–6) | Coleman Coliseum; Tuscaloosa, Alabama |
| Feb 23, 2005 | | at Tennessee | L 72–80 | 14–10 (6–7) | Thompson-Boling Arena; Knoxville, Tennessee |
| Feb 27, 2005 | | Florida | L 65–66 | 14–11 (6–8) | Colonial Center; Columbia, South Carolina |
| Mar 2, 2005 | | at Vanderbilt | L 65–75 | 14–12 (6–9) | Memorial Gymnasium; Nashville, Tennessee |
| Mar 6, 2005 | | Ole Miss | W 76–70 ^{OT} | 15–12 (7–9) | Colonial Center; Columbia, South Carolina |
SEC Tournament
| Mar 10, 2005* | (E4) | vs. (W5) Ole Miss; First round | L 52–53 | 15–13 | Georgia Dome; Atlanta, Georgia |
NIT
| Mar 15, 2005* | | Miami (FL); First round | W 69–67 | 16–13 | Colonial Center; Columbia, South Carolina |
| Mar 22, 2005* | | UNLV; Second round | W 77–66 | 17–13 | Colonial Center; Columbia, South Carolina |
| Mar 24, 2005* | | Georgetown; Quarterfinals | W 69–66 | 18–13 | Colonial Center (10,662); Columbia, South Carolina |
| Mar 29, 2005* | | vs. Maryland; Semifinals | W 75–67 | 19–13 | Madison Square Garden; New York, New York |
| Mar 31, 2005* | | vs. Saint Joseph's; Championship game | W 60–57 | 20–13 | Madison Square Garden; New York, New York |
*Non-conference game. ^{#}Rankings from AP Poll. (#) Tournament seedings in parentheses. All times are in Eastern Time.
