= 2004–05 Delaware State Hornets men's basketball team =

American college basketball season

2004–05 Delaware State Hornets men's basketball

MEAC tournament champions MEAC regular season champions

NCAA tournament, First round
- Conference: Mid-Eastern Athletic Conference
- Record: 19–14 (14–4 MEAC)
- Head coach: Greg Jackson
- Home arena: Memorial Hall

2004–05 MEAC men's basketball standings
	Conf.				Overall
Team	W		L	PCT	W		L	PCT
Delaware State †	14	–	4	.778	19	–	14	.576
Hampton	13	–	5	.722	17	–	13	.567
Coppin State	13	–	5	.722	14	–	15	.483
South Carolina State	11	–	7	.611	19	–	12	.613
Norfolk State	11	–	7	.611	13	–	14	.481
Morgan State	11	–	7	.611	14	–	16	.467
Florida A&M	10	–	8	.556	14	–	15	.483
Bethune–Cookman	8	–	10	.444	13	–	17	.433
North Carolina A&T	5	–	13	.278	6	–	24	.200
Howard	2	–	16	.111	5	–	23	.179
Maryland Eastern Shore	1	–	17	.056	2	–	26	.071
† 2005 MEAC tournament winner Rankings from AP Poll

The 2004–05 Delaware State Hornets men's basketball team represented Delaware State University during the 2004–05 NCAA Division I men's basketball season. The Hornets, led by head coach Greg Jackson, played their home games at Memorial Hall and were members of the Mid-Eastern Athletic Conference. They finished the season 19–14, 14–4 in MEAC play to finish in first place. They defeated Bethune-Cookman, South Carolina State, and Hampton to win the MEAC tournament and secure the conference's automatic bid to the NCAA tournament – the first, and only, appearance in school history. Playing as No. 16 seed in the South region, the Hornets were beaten by No. 1 seed Duke in the opening round.

== Roster ==
2004–05 Delaware State Hornets men's basketball team
Players
Coaches

Pos.	#	Name	Height	Weight	Year	Hometown
G	0	Darrin Shine	5 ft 10 in (1.78 m)	170 lb (77 kg)	So	Augusta, Georgia
G	2	Aaron Williams	6 ft 2 in (1.88 m)	175 lb (79 kg)	Sr	New Rochelle, New York
G	33	Jahsha Bluntt	6 ft 5 in (1.96 m)	220 lb (100 kg)	So	Los Angeles, California

Head coach

- Greg Jackson

Assistant coach(es)

Legend

- (C) Team captain
- (S) Suspended
- (I) Ineligible
- (W) Walk-on
- Injured
- Current redshirt

== Schedule and results ==
Date time, TV	Rank^{#}	Opponent^{#}	Result	Record	Site (attendance) city, state
Regular season
Dec 18, 2004*		at No. 21 Michigan State	L 45–63	2–6	Breslin Student Events Center; East Lansing, Michigan
Mar 5, 2005		at Howard	W 64–57	16–13 (14–4)	Burr Gymnasium; Washington, D.C.
MEAC tournament
Mar 9, 2005*		vs. Bethune-Cookman; Quarterfinals	W 66–43	17–13	Arthur Ashe Athletic Center; Richmond, Virginia
Mar 11, 2005*		vs. South Carolina State; Semifinals	W 61–48	18–13	Arthur Ashe Athletic Center; Richmond, Virginia
Mar 12, 2005*		vs. Hampton; Championship game	W 55–53	19–13	Arthur Ashe Athletic Center; Richmond, Virginia
NCAA tournament
Mar 18, 2005*	(16 S)	vs. (1 S) No. 3 Duke; First round	L 46–57	19–14	Charlotte Coliseum; Charlotte, North Carolina
*Non-conference game. ^{#}Rankings from AP Poll. (#) Tournament seedings in parentheses. All times are in Eastern Time.
