= 2005 MEAC men's basketball tournament =

- Classification: Division I
- Season: 2004–05
- Teams: 11
- Site: Arthur Ashe Athletic Center; Richmond, Virginia
- Champions: Delaware State (1st title)
- Winning coach: Greg Jackson (1st title)
- MVP: Jahsha Bluntt (Delaware State)

2004–05 MEAC men's basketball standings
	Conf.				Overall
Team	W		L	PCT	W		L	PCT
Delaware State †	14	–	4	.778	19	–	14	.576
Hampton	13	–	5	.722	17	–	13	.567
Coppin State	13	–	5	.722	14	–	15	.483
South Carolina State	11	–	7	.611	19	–	12	.613
Norfolk State	11	–	7	.611	13	–	14	.481
Morgan State	11	–	7	.611	14	–	16	.467
Florida A&M	10	–	8	.556	14	–	15	.483
Bethune–Cookman	8	–	10	.444	13	–	17	.433
North Carolina A&T	5	–	13	.278	6	–	24	.200
Howard	2	–	16	.111	5	–	23	.179
Maryland Eastern Shore	1	–	17	.056	2	–	26	.071
† 2005 MEAC tournament winner Rankings from AP Poll

The 2005 Mid-Eastern Athletic Conference men's basketball tournament took place March 7–12, 2005, at the Arthur Ashe Athletic Center in Richmond, Virginia. Delaware State defeated Hampton, 55–53 in the championship game, to capture its first MEAC Tournament title. The Hornets earned an automatic bid to the 2005 NCAA tournament as No. 16 seed in the East region. In the round of 64 where they fell to No. 1 seed Duke 57–46.

== Format ==
All eleven conference members participated, with the top 5 teams receiving a bye to the quarterfinal round. After seeds 6 through 11 completed games in the first round, teams were re-seeded. The lowest remaining seed was slotted against the top seed, next lowest remaining faced the #2 seed, and third lowest remaining seed squared off against the #3 seed.

== Bracket ==
First round Tuesday-Wednesday, March 7–8
8	Bethune–Cookman	76
9	North Carolina A&T	62
6	Morgan State	77
11	Maryland Eastern Shore	56
7	Florida A&M	80
10	Howard	56

Quarterfinals; Wednesday-Thursday, March 9–10
1	Delaware State	66
8	Bethune–Cookman	43
4	South Carolina State	76
5	Norfolk State	59
6	Morgan State	43
3	Coppin State	60
2	Hampton	81
7	Florida A&M	72

Semifinals; Friday, March 11
1	Delaware State	61
4	South Carolina State	48
3	Coppin State	50
2	Hampton	62

Final; Saturday, March 12
1	Delaware State	55
2	Hampton	53
