= 2004–05 Auburn Tigers men's basketball team =

American college basketball season

2004–05 Auburn Tigers men's basketball

San Juan Shootout champions
- Conference: Southeastern Conference
- West
- Record: 14–17 (4–12 SEC)
- Head coach: Jeff Lebo (1st season)
- Captains: Nathan Watson; Ian Young; Quinnel Brown
- Home arena: Beard–Eaves–Memorial Coliseum

2004–05 Southeastern Conference men's basketball standings
	Conf.				Overall
Team	W		L	PCT	W		L	PCT
East
No. 7 Kentucky	14	–	2	.875	28	–	6	.824
No. 16 Florida †	12	–	4	.750	24	–	8	.750
Vanderbilt	8	–	8	.500	20	–	14	.588
South Carolina	7	–	9	.438	20	–	13	.606
Tennessee	6	–	10	.375	14	–	17	.452
Georgia	2	–	14	.125	8	–	20	.286
West
No. 21 Alabama	12	–	4	.750	24	–	8	.750
LSU	12	–	4	.750	20	–	10	.667
Mississippi State	9	–	7	.563	23	–	11	.676
Arkansas	6	–	10	.375	18	–	12	.600
Ole Miss	4	–	12	.250	14	–	17	.452
Auburn	4	–	12	.250	14	–	17	.452
† 2005 SEC tournament winner Rankings from AP Poll

The 2004–05 Auburn Tigers men's basketball team represented Auburn University in the 2004–05 college basketball season. The team's head coach was Jeff Lebo, who was in his first season at Auburn. The team played their home games at Beard–Eaves–Memorial Coliseum in Auburn, Alabama. They finished the season 14–17, 4–12 in SEC play. They defeated Vanderbilt to advance to the quarterfinals of the SEC tournament where they lost to LSU.
