= 2005 SEC men's basketball tournament =

- Classification: Division I
- Season: 2004–05
- Teams: 12
- Site: Georgia Dome; Atlanta, Georgia
- Champions: Florida (1st title)
- Winning coach: Billy Donovan (1st title)
- MVP: Matt Walsh, Florida

2004–05 Southeastern Conference men's basketball standings
| | Conf. | | | | Overall |
| Team | W | | L | PCT | W | | L | PCT |
|---|---|---|---|---|---|---|---|---|
East
| No. 7 Kentucky | 14 | – | 2 | .875 | 28 | – | 6 | .824 |
| No. 16 Florida † | 12 | – | 4 | .750 | 24 | – | 8 | .750 |
| Vanderbilt | 8 | – | 8 | .500 | 20 | – | 14 | .588 |
| South Carolina | 7 | – | 9 | .438 | 20 | – | 13 | .606 |
| Tennessee | 6 | – | 10 | .375 | 14 | – | 17 | .452 |
| Georgia | 2 | – | 14 | .125 | 8 | – | 20 | .286 |
West
| No. 21 Alabama | 12 | – | 4 | .750 | 24 | – | 8 | .750 |
| LSU | 12 | – | 4 | .750 | 20 | – | 10 | .667 |
| Mississippi State | 9 | – | 7 | .563 | 23 | – | 11 | .676 |
| Arkansas | 6 | – | 10 | .375 | 18 | – | 12 | .600 |
| Ole Miss | 4 | – | 12 | .250 | 14 | – | 17 | .452 |
| Auburn | 4 | – | 12 | .250 | 14 | – | 17 | .452 |
† 2005 SEC tournament winner Rankings from AP Poll

The 2005 SEC men's basketball tournament took place from March 10–13, 2005 in Atlanta, Georgia at the Georgia Dome. The SEC Championship Game was televised by CBS.

The top two teams in both the Eastern and Western Divisions receive byes in the first round, which were Kentucky, Alabama, LSU, and Florida and played their second-round games on March 11, 2005. The winner of the tournament, Florida, received the SEC's automatic bid to the NCAA Tournament. This was Florida's first SEC tournament championship.

== Bracket ==
First round
W5 | Mississippi | 53
E4 | South Carolina | 52
W3 | Mississippi State | 76
E6 | Georgia | 65
E5 | Tennessee | 65
W4 | Arkansas | 46
W6 | Auburn | 77
E3 | Vanderbilt | 73

Second Round
W1 | #20 Alabama | 69
W5 | Ole Miss | 52
E2 | #16 Florida | 80
W3 | Mississippi State | 64
E1 | #4 Kentucky | 76
E5 | Tennessee | 62
W2 | LSU | 89
W6 | Auburn | 58

Semifinals
E2 | #16 Florida | 68
W1 | #20 Alabama | 62
E1 | #4 Kentucky | 79*
W2 | LSU | 78

Championship game
E2 | #16 Florida | 70
E1 | #4 Kentucky | 53

Asterisk denotes game ended in overtime.
