= Greg Jackson (basketball, born 1959) =

Biographical details
- Born: December 29, 1959 (age 66); Augusta, Georgia, U.S.

Playing career
- 1976–1980: Saint Paul's

Coaching career (HC unless noted)
- 1984–1991: NC Central (asst.)
- 1991–2000: NC Central
- 2000–2014: Delaware State

Accomplishments and honors

Championships
- MEAC Regular Season championship (2005, 2006, 2007); MEAC Tournament championship (2005)

Awards
- MEAC Coach of the Year (2006, 2007)

Greg Jackson (born December 29, 1959) is the former head men's basketball coach at Delaware State University. He is an alumnus of Saint Paul's College in Lawrenceville, Virginia.

Jackson was at the helm as Delaware State from 2000–2014, and was the second winningest coach in the history of the men's basketball program. He led the Hornets to three straight Mid-Eastern Athletic Conference titles from 2004 to 2007. In 2005, Jackson led the Hornets to their first and, to date, only NCAA tournament bid., where the Hornets lost to number one seeded Duke University by the score of 57–46 in the first round of the 2005 NCAA Tournament. The Delaware Sportswriters and Broadcasters Association named him the 2005 winner of its Tubby Raymond Award for sustained excellence in coaching.

Prior to Delaware State, Jackson was on the coaching staff of the men's basketball team at North Carolina Central University from 1984 to 2000. He served as head coach at NCCU from 1991 to 2000. During his time at NCCU, he helped lead the Eagles to winning the NCAA Division II men's basketball national championship game in 1989. The entire 1989 championship winning team, including Jackson, was inducted into the North Carolina Central University Hall of Fame in 1997. Jackson led the NCCU Eagles to an overall record of 163–77. He led the Eagles to five Central Intercollegiate Athletic Association (CIAA) division titles, and three trips to the NCAA Division II playoffs.
