= 2005 WAC men's basketball tournament =

- Classification: Division I
- Season: 2004–05
- Teams: 8
- Site: Lawlor Events Center; Reno, Nevada
- Champions: UTEP (5th title)
- Winning coach: Doc Sadler (1st title)
- MVP: Filiberto Rivera (UTEP)

2004–05 WAC men's basketball standings
	Conf.				Overall
Team	W		L	PCT	W		L	PCT
Nevada	16	–	2	.889	25	–	7	.781
UTEP †	14	–	4	.778	27	–	8	.771
Rice	12	–	6	.667	19	–	12	.613
Fresno State	9	–	9	.500	16	–	14	.533
Louisiana Tech	9	–	9	.500	14	–	15	.483
SMU	9	–	9	.500	14	–	14	.500
Hawaii	7	–	11	.389	16	–	13	.552
Boise State	6	–	12	.333	16	–	18	.471
Tulsa	5	–	13	.278	9	–	20	.310
San Jose State	3	–	15	.167	6	–	23	.207
† 2005 WAC tournament winner

The 2005 WAC men's basketball tournament was held in the Lawlor Events Center in Reno, Nevada between Tuesday, March 8, and Saturday, March 12. The winners of the tournament were the #2 seeded UTEP. This was the final season before the conference was restructured before the 2005–06 season.

== Bracket ==
Play-In Round – March 8
10	San Jose State	48
7	Hawaii	72
9	Tulsa	73
8	Boise State	83

Quarterfinals – March 10–11
7	Hawaii	62
2	UTEP	80
6	SMU	47
3	Rice	63
5	Louisiana Tech	81
4	Fresno State	84
8	Boise State	73
1	Nevada	72

Semifinals – March 12
2	UTEP	85
3	Rice	77
4	Fresno State	85
8	Boise State	86

Finals – March 13
2	UTEP	91
8	Boise State	78
