= 2005 Big 12 men's basketball tournament =

- Classification: Division I
- Season: 2004–05
- Teams: 12
- Site: Kemper Arena; Kansas City, Missouri
- Champions: Oklahoma State (2nd title)
- Winning coach: Eddie Sutton (2nd title)
- MVP: Joey Graham (Oklahoma State)
- Attendance: 109,608 (overall); 18,268 (championship)
- Top scorer: Joey Graham (Oklahoma State) (65 points)
- Television: ESPN, ESPN2, ESPNU

2004–05 Big 12 men's basketball standings
| | Conf. | | | | Overall |
| Team | W | | L | PCT | W | | L | PCT |
|---|---|---|---|---|---|---|---|---|
| No. 17 Oklahoma | 12 | – | 4 | .750 | 25 | – | 8 | .758 |
| No. 12 Kansas | 12 | – | 4 | .750 | 23 | – | 7 | .767 |
| No. 6 Oklahoma State † | 11 | – | 5 | .688 | 26 | – | 7 | .788 |
| No. 24 Texas Tech | 10 | – | 6 | .625 | 22 | – | 11 | .667 |
| Iowa State | 9 | – | 7 | .563 | 19 | – | 12 | .613 |
| Texas | 9 | – | 7 | .563 | 20 | – | 11 | .645 |
| Texas A&M | 8 | – | 8 | .500 | 21 | – | 10 | .677 |
| Missouri | 7 | – | 9 | .438 | 16 | – | 17 | .485 |
| Nebraska | 7 | – | 9 | .438 | 14 | – | 14 | .500 |
| Kansas State | 6 | – | 10 | .375 | 17 | – | 12 | .586 |
| Colorado | 4 | – | 12 | .250 | 14 | – | 16 | .467 |
| Baylor | 1 | – | 15 | .063 | 9 | – | 19 | .321 |
† 2005 Big 12 Tournament winner Rankings from AP poll

The 2005 Big 12 men's basketball tournament was the postseason men's basketball tournament for the Big 12 Conference. It was played from March 10 to 13 in Kansas City, Missouri at Kemper Arena. Oklahoma State won the tournament for the 2nd time and received the conference's automatic bid to the 2005 NCAA tournament.

== Seeding ==
The Tournament consisted of a 12 team single-elimination tournament with the top 4 seeds receiving a bye.

2005 Big 12 Men's Basketball Tournament seeds
| Seed | School | Conf. | Over. |
| 1 | Oklahoma ‡# | 12–4 | 25–8 |
| 2 | Kansas c# | 12–4 | 23–7 |
| 3 | Oklahoma State # | 11–5 | 26–7 |
| 4 | Texas Tech # | 10–6 | 22–11 |
| 5 | Iowa State | 9–7 | 19–12 |
| 6 | Texas | 9–7 | 20–11 |
| 7 | Texas A&M | 8–8 | 21–10 |
| 8 | Missouri | 7–9 | 16–17 |
| 9 | Nebraska | 7–9 | 14–14 |
| 10 | Kansas State | 6–10 | 17–12 |
| 11 | Colorado | 4–12 | 14–16 |
| 12 | Baylor | 1–15 | 9–19 |
‡ – Big 12 Conference regular season champions, and tournament No. 1 seed. c – Big 12 Conference regular season co-champion, not tournament No. 1 seed. # – Received a single-bye in the conference tournament. Overall records include all games played in the Big 12 Conference tournament.

== Schedule ==
| Session | Game | Time | Matchup | Television | Attendance |
First Round – Thursday, March 10
| 1 | 1 | 11:30 am | #8 Missouri 70 vs #9 Nebraska 67 | ESPNU | 18,268 |
| 1 | 2 | 2:00 pm | #5 Iowa State 77 vs #12 Baylor 57 | ESPNU | 18,268 |
| 2 | 3 | 6:00 pm | #10 Kansas State 68 vs #7 Texas A&M 62 | ESPNU | 18,268 |
| 2 | 5 | 11:30 am | #1 Oklahoma 83 vs #8 Missouri 79 | ESPNU | 18,268 |
Quarterfinals – Friday, March 11
| 3 | 5 | 11:30 am | #1 Oklahoma 83 vs #8 Missouri 79 | ESPNU | 18,268 |
| 3 | 6 | 2:00 pm | #4 Texas Tech 64 vs #5 Iowa State 56 | ESPNU | 18,268 |
| 4 | 7 | 6:00 pm | #2 Kansas 80 vs #10 Kansas State 67 | ESPNU | 18,268 |
| 4 | 8 | 8:20 pm | #3 Oklahoma State 87 vs #11 Colorado 85 | ESPNU | 18,268 |
Semifinals – Saturday, March 12
| 5 | 9 | 1:00 pm | #4 Texas Tech 69 vs #1 Oklahoma 63 | ESPN2 | 18,268 |
| 5 | 10 | 3:20 pm | #3 Oklahoma State 78 vs #2 Kansas 75 | ESPN2 | 18,268 |
Final – Sunday, March 13
| 6 | 11 | 2:00 pm | #3 Oklahoma State 72 vs #4 Texas Tech 68 | ESPN | 18,268 |
Game times in CT. #-Rankings denote tournament seed

== Bracket ==
First Round; Thursday, March 10
8 | Missouri | 70
9 | Nebraska | 67
5 | Iowa St | 77
12 | Baylor | 57
6 | Texas | 69
11 | Colorado | 81
7 | Texas A&M | 62
10 | Kansas St | 68

Quarterfinals; Friday, March 11
8 | Missouri | 79
1 | #17 Oklahoma | 83
5 | Iowa St | 56
4 | Texas Tech | 64
11 | Colorado | 85
3 | #10 Oklahoma St | 87
2 | #9 Kansas | 80
10 | Kansas St | 67

Semifinals; Saturday, March 12
1 | #17 Oklahoma | 63
4 | Texas Tech | 69
3 | #10 Oklahoma St | 78
2 | #9 Kansas | 75

Finals; Sunday, March 13
4 | Texas Tech | 68
3 | #10 Oklahoma St | 72

== All-Tournament Team ==
Most Outstanding Player – Joey Graham, Oklahoma State

| Player | Team | Position | Class |
|---|---|---|---|
| Joey Graham | Oklahoma State | Sr. | F |
| John Lucas | Oklahoma State | Sr. | G |
| Linas Kleiza | Missouri | So. | F |
| Wayne Simien | Kansas | Sr. | F |
| Ronald Ross | Texas Tech | Sr. | G |

== See also ==
- 2005 Big 12 Conference women's basketball tournament
- 2005 NCAA Division I men's basketball tournament
- 2004–05 NCAA Division I men's basketball rankings
