= 2004–05 Oklahoma State Cowboys basketball team =

American college basketball season

2004–05 Oklahoma State Cowboys basketball

Big 12 tournament champions

NCAA tournament, Sweet Sixteen
- Conference: Big 12 Conference

Ranking
- Coaches: No. 8
- AP: No. 8
- Record: 26-7 (11–5 Big 12)
- Head coach: Eddie Sutton (15th season)
- Assistant coaches: Sean Sutton; James Dickey
- Home arena: Gallagher-Iba Arena (Capacity: 13,611)

2004–05 Big 12 men's basketball standings
| | Conf. | | | | Overall |
| Team | W | | L | PCT | W | | L | PCT |
|---|---|---|---|---|---|---|---|---|
| No. 17 Oklahoma | 12 | – | 4 | .750 | 25 | – | 8 | .758 |
| No. 12 Kansas | 12 | – | 4 | .750 | 23 | – | 7 | .767 |
| No. 6 Oklahoma State † | 11 | – | 5 | .688 | 26 | – | 7 | .788 |
| No. 24 Texas Tech | 10 | – | 6 | .625 | 22 | – | 11 | .667 |
| Iowa State | 9 | – | 7 | .563 | 19 | – | 12 | .613 |
| Texas | 9 | – | 7 | .563 | 20 | – | 11 | .645 |
| Texas A&M | 8 | – | 8 | .500 | 21 | – | 10 | .677 |
| Missouri | 7 | – | 9 | .438 | 16 | – | 17 | .485 |
| Nebraska | 7 | – | 9 | .438 | 14 | – | 14 | .500 |
| Kansas State | 6 | – | 10 | .375 | 17 | – | 12 | .586 |
| Colorado | 4 | – | 12 | .250 | 14 | – | 16 | .467 |
| Baylor | 1 | – | 15 | .063 | 9 | – | 19 | .321 |
† 2005 Big 12 Tournament winner Rankings from AP poll

The 2004–05 Oklahoma State Cowboys basketball team represented Oklahoma State University as a member of the Big 12 Conference during the 2004–05 NCAA Division I men's basketball season. The team was led by 15th-year head coach Eddie Sutton and played their home games at Gallagher-Iba Arena. The Cowboys followed the previous season’s Final Four appearance by finishing with a record of 27–6 (11–5 Big 12) and a No. 8 final ranking in each of the two major polls.

After winning the Big 12 tournament, Oklahoma State received an automatic bid to the NCAA tournament as No. 2 seed in the Chicago region. After defeating Southeastern Louisiana in the opening round, the Cowboys defeated No. 7 seed Southern Illinois to reach the Sweet Sixteen. The run ended in the regional semifinal, as Arizona defeated OSU 79–78. It would end up being Coach Sutton’s final Tournament appearance.

== Roster ==
2004–05 Oklahoma State Cowboys men's basketball team
Players
Coaches

| Pos. | # | Name | Height | Weight | Year | Previous school | Hometown |
|---|---|---|---|---|---|---|---|
| F | 14 | Joey Graham | 6 ft 7 in (2.01 m) | 225 lb (102 kg) | Sr | UCF | Brandon, Florida |
| G | 15 | John Lucas III | 5 ft 11 in (1.8 m) | 165 lb (75 kg) | Sr | Baylor | Bellaire, Texas |
| G/F | 21 | Stephen Graham | 6 ft 6 in (1.98 m) | 215 lb (98 kg) | Sr | UCF | Brandon, Florida |
| F | 23 | Ivan McFarlin | 6 ft 8 in (2.03 m) | 240 lb (109 kg) | Sr | | Houston, Texas |
| G | 24 | JamesOn Curry | 6 ft 3 in (1.91 m) | 190 lb (86 kg) | Fr | | Pleasant Grove, North Carolina |

Head coach

- Eddie Sutton

Assistant coach(es)

Legend

- (C) Team captain
- (S) Suspended
- (I) Ineligible
- (W) Walk-on
- Injured
- Current redshirt

== Schedule and results ==
| Date time, TV | Rank^{#} | Opponent^{#} | Result | Record | Site (attendance) city, state |
Regular season
| Nov 19, 2004* | No. 7 | Northwestern State | W 91–53 | 1–0 | Gallagher-Iba Arena; Stillwater, Oklahoma |
| Nov 23, 2004* | No. 6 | Arkansas-Little Rock | W 90–65 | 2–0 | Gallagher-Iba Arena; Stillwater, Oklahoma |
| Nov 27, 2004* | No. 6 | Sam Houston State | W 73–57 | 3–0 | Gallagher-Iba Arena; Stillwater, Oklahoma |
| Nov 29, 2004* | No. 6 | at Southern Methodist | W 76–57 | 4–0 | Moody Coliseum; Dallas, Texas |
| Dec 4, 2004* | No. 5 | Washington State | W 81–29 | 5–0 | Gallagher-Iba Arena; Stillwater, Oklahoma |
| Dec 7, 2004* | No. 5 | vs. No. 4 Syracuse; Jimmy V Classic | W 74–60 | 6–0 | Madison Square Garden; New York, New York |
| Dec 10, 2004* | No. 5 | UAB | W 86–73 | 7–0 | Gallagher-Iba Arena; Stillwater, Oklahoma |
| Dec 18, 2004* | No. 4 | at UNLV | W 79–67 | 8–0 | Thomas & Mack Center; Las Vegas, Nevada |
| Dec 21, 2004 | No. 3 | Northwestern Oklahoma State | W 92–35 | 9–0 | Gallagher-Iba Arena; Stillwater, Oklahoma |
| Dec 28, 2004* | No. 3 | vs. No. 12 Gonzaga; All-College Basketball Classic | L 75–78 | 9–1 | Ford Center (18,202); Oklahoma City, Oklahoma |
| Jan 3, 2005 | No. 7 | at Texas A&M | W 86–61 | 10–1 (1–0) | American Bank Center; College Station, Texas |
| Jan 8, 2005 | No. 7 | at Texas Tech | W 76–66 | 11–1 (2–0) | United Spirit Arena; Lubbock, Texas |
| Jan 11, 2005 | No. 6 | Missouri | W 78–68 | 12–1 (3–0) | Gallagher-Iba Arena; Stillwater, Oklahoma |
| Jan 15, 2005 | No. 6 | Iowa State | W 83–73 | 13–1 (4–0) | Gallagher-Iba Arena; Stillwater, Oklahoma |
| Jan 17, 2005 | No. 5 | at No. 15 Texas | L 61–75 | 13–2 (4–1) | Frank Erwin Center; Austin, Texas |
| Jan 22, 2005 | No. 5 | Baylor | W 82–53 | 14–2 (5–1) | Gallagher-Iba Arena; Stillwater, Oklahoma |
| Jan 24, 2005 | No. 9 | at No. 13 Oklahoma | L 57–67 | 14–3 (5–2) | Lloyd Noble Center; Norman, Oklahoma |
| Jan 30, 2005 | No. 9 | at Colorado | W 104–86 | 15–3 (6–2) | Coors Events Center; Boulder, Colorado |
| Feb 2, 2005 | No. 10 | Kansas State | W 77–57 | 16–3 (7–2) | Gallagher-Iba Arena; Stillwater, Oklahoma |
| Feb 5, 2005 | No. 10 | at Baylor | W 81–63 | 17–3 (8–2) | Ferrell Center; Waco, Texas |
| Feb 7, 2005 | No. 10 | No. 16 Oklahoma | W 79–67 | 18–3 (9–2) | Gallagher-Iba Arena; Stillwater, Oklahoma |
| Feb 12, 2005 | No. 10 | at Texas A&M | W 66–59 | 19–3 (10–2) | Reed Arena; College Station, Texas |
| Feb 19, 2005 | No. 8 | Texas Tech | W 85–56 | 20–3 (11–2) | Gallagher-Iba Arena; Stillwater, Oklahoma |
| Feb 22, 2005 | No. 4 | at Nebraska | L 67–74 | 20–4 (11–3) | Bob Devaney Sports Center; Lincoln, Nebraska |
| Feb 27, 2005 | No. 4 | at No. 8 Kansas | L 79–81 | 20–5 (11–4) | Allen Fieldhouse; Lawrence, Kansas |
| Mar 5, 2005 | No. 8 | Texas; College GameDay | L 73–74 | 21–6 (11–5) | Gallagher-Iba Arena; Stillwater, Oklahoma |
Big 12 Tournament
| Mar 11, 2005* | (3) No. 10 | vs. (11) Colorado; Quarterfinals | W 87–85 | 22–6 | Kemper Arena; Kansas City, Missouri |
| Mar 12, 2005* | (3) No. 10 | vs. (2) No. 9 Kansas; Semifinals | W 78–75 | 23–6 | Kemper Arena; Kansas City, Missouri |
| Mar 13, 2005* | (3) No. 10 | vs. (4) Texas Tech; Championship Game | W 72–68 | 24–6 | Kemper Arena; Kansas City, Missouri |
NCAA tournament
| Mar 18, 2005* | (2 C) No. 8 | vs. (15 C) Southeastern Louisiana; First round | W 63–50 | 25–6 | Ford Center; Oklahoma City, Oklahoma |
| Mar 20, 2005* | (2 C) No. 8 | vs. (7 C) Southern Illinois; Second Round | W 85–77 | 26–6 | Ford Center; Oklahoma City, Oklahoma |
| Mar 24, 2005* | (2 C) No. 8 | vs. (3 C) No. 9 Arizona; Regional semifinal – Sweet Sixteen | L 78–79 | 26–7 | Allstate Arena (16,957); Rosemont, Illinois |
*Non-conference game. ^{#}Rankings from AP poll. (#) Tournament seedings in parentheses. C=Chicago. All times are in Central Time.

== Awards and honors ==
- Joey Graham – Third-Team All-American (AP)
- John Lucas III – Honorable Mention All-American (AP)

== NBA draft ==
| Round | Pick | Player | NBA club |
|---|---|---|---|
| 1 | 16 | Joey Graham | Toronto Raptors |
