= 2004–05 Iowa State Cyclones men's basketball team =

American college basketball season

2004–05 Iowa State Cyclones men's basketball
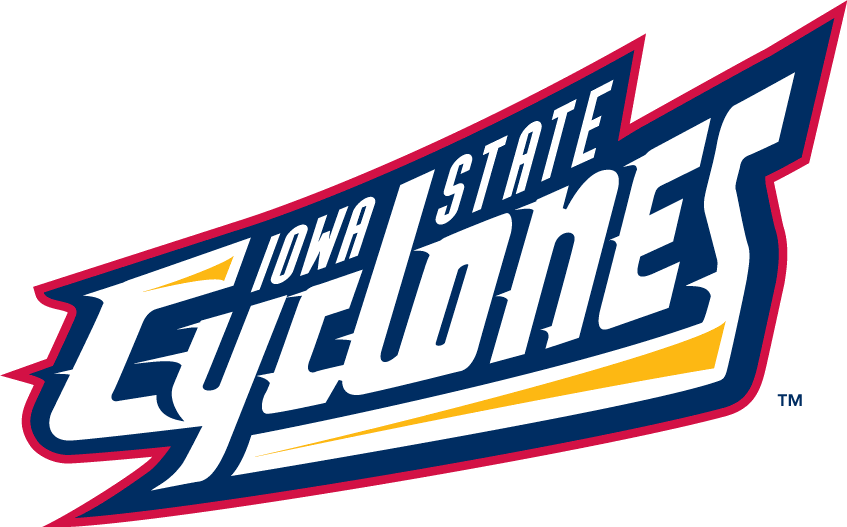

NCAA tournament, second round
- Conference: Big 12 Conference
- Record: 19–12 (9–7 Big 12)
- Head coach: Wayne Morgan (2nd season)
- Assistant coaches: Damon Archibald; Bob Sundvold; Darryl Sharp
- Home arena: Hilton Coliseum

2004–05 Big 12 men's basketball standings
	Conf.				Overall
Team	W		L	PCT	W		L	PCT
No. 17 Oklahoma	12	–	4	.750	25	–	8	.758
No. 12 Kansas	12	–	4	.750	23	–	7	.767
No. 6 Oklahoma State †	11	–	5	.688	26	–	7	.788
No. 24 Texas Tech	10	–	6	.625	22	–	11	.667
Iowa State	9	–	7	.563	19	–	12	.613
Texas	9	–	7	.563	20	–	11	.645
Texas A&M	8	–	8	.500	21	–	10	.677
Missouri	7	–	9	.438	16	–	17	.485
Nebraska	7	–	9	.438	14	–	14	.500
Kansas State	6	–	10	.375	17	–	12	.586
Colorado	4	–	12	.250	14	–	16	.467
Baylor	1	–	15	.063	9	–	19	.321
† 2005 Big 12 Tournament winner Rankings from AP poll

The 2004–05 Iowa State Cyclones men's basketball team represented Iowa State University during the 2004–05 NCAA Division I men's basketball season. The Cyclones were coached by Wayne Morgan, who was in his second season. They played their home games at Hilton Coliseum in Ames, Iowa, and competed in the Big 12 Conference.

== Previous season ==
The Cyclones finished 20–13, 7–9 in Big 12 play to finish 8th the regular season conference standings. They lost to Oklahoma State in the quarterfinals of the Big 12 tournament. They received an at-large bid to the NIT tournament, where they defeated Georgia, Florida State, and Marquette, and lost to Rutgers in the Final Four.

== Incoming players ==
Incoming players
Name	Position	Height	Weight	Previous school	Hometown
Tasheed Carr	Guard	6'4"	205 lbs.	Mount Zion Christian Academy	Philadelphia
Rahshon Clark	Forward	6'6"	190 lbs.	Queens, New York	Bridgton Academy
Anthony Davis	Forward	6'5"	220 lbs.	Los Angeles City College	Compton, California
Aaron Agnew	Center	6'10"	385 lbs.	Bridgeport, Ohio	Bellaire High
Robert Faulkner	Forward	6'8"	210 lbs.	Peoria, Illinois	South Plains College

== Roster ==
2004–05 Iowa State Cyclones men's basketball team
Players
Coaches

Pos.	#	Name	Height	Weight	Year	Previous school	Hometown
G	1	Curtis Stinson (C)	6 ft 2 in (1.88 m)	205 lb (93 kg)	So	Winchendon Prep	The Bronx
G	3	John Neal	6 ft 3 in (1.91 m)	180 lb (82 kg)	Jr	Winterset High	Winterset, Iowa
G	10	Tasheed Carr	6 ft 4 in (1.93 m)	205 lb (93 kg)	Fr	Mount Zion Christian Academy	Philadelphia, Pennsylvania
G	11	Will Blalock	5 ft 11 in (1.8 m)	185 lb (84 kg)	So	Notre Dame Prep	Boston
F	13	Rahshon Clark	6 ft 6 in (1.98 m)	190 lb (86 kg)	Fr	Bridgton Academy	Queens, New York
F	22	Damion Staple	6 ft 8 in (2.03 m)	230 lb (104 kg)	Sr	Southeastern Illinois	Kingston, Jamaica
F	24	Anthony Davis	6 ft 5 in (1.96 m)	220 lb (100 kg)	RS Jr	Los Angeles City College	Compton, California
C	30	Aaron Agnew	6 ft 10 in (2.08 m)	385 lb (175 kg)	Fr	Bellaire High	Bridgeport, Ohio
F	34	Jeff Bergstrom	6 ft 4 in (1.93 m)	190 lb (86 kg)	So	Kingwood High	Kingwood, Texas
G	40	Dave Braet	6 ft 3 in (1.91 m)	185 lb (84 kg)	RS Sr	Calamus–Wheatland	Calamus, Iowa
C	41	Reggie George	6 ft 9 in (2.06 m)	230 lb (104 kg)	So	Notre Dame Prep	Chicago
F	42	Robert Faulkner	6 ft 8 in (2.03 m)	210 lb (95 kg)	RS So	South Plains College	Peoria, Illinois
C	51	Jared Homan (C)	6 ft 9 in (2.06 m)	230 lb (104 kg)	Sr	St. Mary's	Remsen, Iowa

Head coach

- Wayne Morgan (St. Lawrence)

Assistant coach(es)

- Damon Archibald (Boise State)
- Bob Sundvold
- Darryl Sharp

Legend

- (C) Team captain
- (S) Suspended
- (I) Ineligible
- (W) Walk-on
- Injured
- Current redshirt

== Schedule and results ==
Date time, TV	Rank^{#}	Opponent^{#}	Result	Record	Site city, state
Exhibition
November 9, 2004*; 7:00 pm		Bemidji State	W 80–57		Hilton Coliseum; Ames, Iowa
November 15, 2004*; 7:00 pm		EA Sports All-Stars; Exhibition	W 81–54		Hilton Coliseum; Ames, Iowa
Regular season
November 23, 2004*; 7:00 pm, Cyclone Television Network		Drake	W 73–46	1–0	Hilton Coliseum; Ames, Iowa
November 26, 2004*; 8:00 pm, Mediacom		Northern Colorado; Cyclone Challenge	W 57–39	2–0	Hilton Coliseum; Ames, Iowa
November 27, 2004*; 8:00 pm, Mediacom		Bucknell; Cyclone Challenge	W 62–55	3–0	Hilton Coliseum; Ames, Iowa
December 1, 2004*; 7:00 pm, UNI		at UNI	L 82–99	3–1	McLeod Center; Cedar Falls, Iowa
December 6, 2004*; 6:00 pm, ESPN2		No. 19 Virginia	W 81–79	4–1	Hilton Coliseum; Ames, Iowa
December 10, 2004*; 7:00 pm, ITN		at No. 17 Iowa; Hy-Vee Cy-Hawk Series	L 63–70	4–2	Carver–Hawkeye Arena; Iowa City, Iowa
December 12, 2004*; 1:00 pm, Cyclone Television Network		Howard	W 92–75	5–2	Hilton Coliseum; Ames, Iowa
December 19, 2004*; 1:00 pm, Cyclone Television Network		Wagner	W 62–50	6–2	Hilton Coliseum; Ames, Iowa
December 28, 2004*; 7:00 pm, Cyclone Television Network		San Diego State	W 69–59	7–2	Hilton Coliseum; Ames, Iowa
December 31, 2004; 7:00 pm		Tennessee State	W 67–61	8–2	Hilton Coliseum; Ames, Iowa
January 3, 2005*; 6:30 pm, FS Ohio/Mediacom		at Xavier	L 59–72	8–3	Cintas Center; Cincinnati
January 8, 2005; 12:45 pm, ESPN Plus		at Missouri	L 59–62	8–4 (0–1)	Hearnes Center; Columbia, Missouri
January 12, 2005; 7:00 pm, Cyclone Television Network		No. 2 Kansas	L 66–71	8–5 (0–2)	Hilton Coliseum; Ames, Iowa
January 15, 2005; 12:30 pm, ABC		at No. 6 Oklahoma State	L 73–83	8–6 (0–3)	Gallagher-Iba Arena; Stillwater, Oklahoma
January 22, 2005; 7:00 pm, Cyclone Television Network		Colorado	L 52–54 ^{OT}	8–7 (0–4)	Hilton Coliseum; Ames, Iowa
January 26, 2005; 6:30 pm, Cyclone Television Network		at Kansas State	L 51–63	8–8 (0–5)	Bramlage Coliseum; Manhattan, Kansas
January 29, 2005; 3:00 pm, ESPN Plus		No. 13 Oklahoma	W 74–66	9–8 (1–5)	Hilton Coliseum; Ames, Iowa
February 1, 2005; 7:00 pm, Cyclone Television Network		Baylor	W 77–51	10–8 (2–5)	Hilton Coliseum; Ames, Iowa
February 5, 2005; 3:00 pm, ESPN Plus		at No. 20 Texas	W 92–80 ^{OT}	11–8 (3–5)	Frank Erwin Center; Austin, Texas
February 8, 2005; 7:00 pm, Cyclone Television Network		at Nebraska	W 65–60	12–8 (4–5)	Bob Devaney Sports Center; Lincoln, Nebraska
February 12, 2005; 3:00 pm, ESPN Plus		No. 25 Texas Tech	W 81–68	13–8 (5–5)	Hilton Coliseum; Ames, Iowa
February 15, 2005; 7:00 pm, Cyclone Television Network		Kansas State	W 57–42	14–8 (6–5)	Hilton Coliseum; Ames, Iowa
February 19, 2005; 12:00 pm, ABC		at No. 2 Kansas	W 63–61 ^{OT}	15–8 (7–5)	Allen Fieldhouse; Lawrence, Kansas
February 22, 2005; 8:00 pm, Cyclone Television Network		at Texas A&M	L 59–75	15–9 (7–6)	Reed Arena; College Station, Texas
February 27, 2005; 1:00 pm, ESPN Plus		Nebraska	L 69–76	15–10 (7–7)	Hilton Coliseum; Ames, Iowa
March 2, 2005; 7:00 pm, Cyclone Television Network		Missouri	W 67–49	16–10 (8–7)	Hilton Coliseum; Ames, Iowa
March 5, 2005; 3:00 pm, ESPN Plus		at Colorado	W 78–73	17–10 (9–7)	Coors Events Center; Boulder, Colorado
Big 12 Tournament
March 10, 2005; 2:00 pm, ESPNU		vs. Baylor	W 77–57	18–10	Kemper Arena; Kansas City, Missouri
March 11, 2005; 2:00 pm, ESPNU		vs. Texas Tech	L 56–64	18–11	Kemper Arena; Kansas City, Missouri
NCAA Tournament
March 18, 2005; 11:30 am, CBS		vs. Minnesota; First round	W 64–53	19–11	Charlotte Coliseum; Charlotte, North Carolina
March 20, 2005; 1:30 pm, CBS		vs. North Carolina; Second round	L 65–92	19–12	Charlotte Coliseum; Charlotte, North Carolina
*Non-conference game. ^{#}Rankings from AP poll. (#) Tournament seedings in parentheses. All times are in Central Time.

== Awards and honors ==
- All-American

Curtis Stinson (Honorable Mention)

- All-Conference Selections

Curtis Stinson (2nd Team)
Jared Homan (3rd Team)

- Ralph A. Olsen Award

Jared Homan (2004)
Curtis Stinson(2004)
