= 2004–05 Texas Tech Red Raiders basketball team =

American college basketball season

2004–05 Texas Tech Red Raiders basketball

NCAA tournament Sweet Sixteen, L 60–65 vs. West Virginia
- Conference: Big 12 Conference
- South

Ranking
- Coaches: No. 16
- AP: No. 24
- Record: 22–11 (10–6 Big 12)
- Head coach: Bob Knight (4th season)
- Assistant coaches: Chris Beard (4th season); Pat Knight (4th season); Stew Robinson (2nd season)
- Home arena: United Spirit Arena

2004–05 Big 12 men's basketball standings
	Conf.				Overall
Team	W		L	PCT	W		L	PCT
No. 17 Oklahoma	12	–	4	.750	25	–	8	.758
No. 12 Kansas	12	–	4	.750	23	–	7	.767
No. 6 Oklahoma State †	11	–	5	.688	26	–	7	.788
No. 24 Texas Tech	10	–	6	.625	22	–	11	.667
Iowa State	9	–	7	.563	19	–	12	.613
Texas	9	–	7	.563	20	–	11	.645
Texas A&M	8	–	8	.500	21	–	10	.677
Missouri	7	–	9	.438	16	–	17	.485
Nebraska	7	–	9	.438	14	–	14	.500
Kansas State	6	–	10	.375	17	–	12	.586
Colorado	4	–	12	.250	14	–	16	.467
Baylor	1	–	15	.063	9	–	19	.321
† 2005 Big 12 Tournament winner Rankings from AP poll

The 2004–05 Texas Tech Red Raiders men's basketball team represented Texas Tech University in the Big 12 Conference during the 2004–05 NCAA Division I men's basketball season. The head coach was Bob Knight, his 4th year with the team. The Red Raiders played their home games in the United Spirit Arena in Lubbock, Texas.

== Roster ==
2004–05 Texas Tech Red Raiders men's basketball team
Players
Coaches

Pos.	#	Name	Height	Weight	Year	Hometown
G	3	Martin Zeno	6 ft 5 in (1.96 m)	200 lb (91 kg)	Fr	Sulphur, Louisiana
G	15	Ronald Ross	6 ft 2 in (1.88 m)	185 lb (84 kg)	Sr	Hobbs, New Mexico
G	22	Jarrius Jackson	6 ft 1 in (1.85 m)	175 lb (79 kg)	So	Monroe, Louisiana

Head coach

- Bob Knight

Assistant coach(es)

- Chris Beard
- Pat Knight

Legend

- (C) Team captain
- (S) Suspended
- (I) Ineligible
- (W) Walk-on
- Injured
- Current redshirt

== Schedule and results ==
Date time, TV	Rank^{#}	Opponent^{#}	Result	Record	Site city, state
Non-conference regular season
Nov 19, 2004*; 7:00 pm		UNC Asheville	W 119–55	1–0	United Spirit Arena; Lubbock, TX
Nov 23, 2004*; 7:00 pm		at TCU	L 68–83	1–1	Daniel–Meyer Coliseum; Fort Worth, TX
Nov 27, 2004*; 8:00 pm		Centenary College	W 93–41	2–1	United Spirit Arena; Lubbock, TX
Dec 1, 2004*; 7:00 pm		SMU	W 105–67	3–1	United Spirit Arena; Lubbock, TX
Dec 4, 2004*; 8:00 pm		UTEP	W 72–57	4–1	Special Events Center; El Paso, TX
Dec 7, 2004*; 7:00 pm		Northern Arizona	W 81–65	5–1	United Spirit Arena; Lubbock, TX
Dec 16, 2004*; 8:00 pm		vs. Ohio State	L 71–77	5–2	American Airlines Arena (9,624); Dallas, TX
Dec 21, 2004*; 6:00 pm		vs. No. 17 Iowa	L 53–83	5–3	United Center (7,176); Chicago, IL
Dec 29, 2004*; 7:00 pm		Georgia State	W 98–56	6–3	United Spirit Arena; Lubbock, TX
Jan 1, 2005*; 2:00 pm		San Francisco	W 97–53	7–3	United Spirit Arena; Lubbock, TX
Jan 4, 2005*; 7:00 pm		Northern Colorado	W 88–68	8–3	United Spirit Arena; Lubbock, TX
Big 12 Regular Season
Jan 8, 2005; 7:00 pm		No. 7 Oklahoma State	L 66–76	8–4 (0–1)	United Spirit Arena; Lubbock, TX
Jan 12, 2005; 7:00 pm		at Kansas State	W 79–76	9–4 (1–1)	Bramlage Coliseum; Manhattan, KS
Jan 15, 2005; 6:00 pm		Texas A&M	W 70–56	10–4 (2–1)	United Spirit Arena; Lubbock, TX
Jan 19, 2005; 7:00 pm		at Missouri	W 78–62	11–4 (3–1)	Hearnes Center; Columbia, MO
Jan 25, 2005; 8:00 pm		at No. 16 Texas	L 73–80	11–5 (3–2)	Frank Erwin Center; Austin, TX
Jan 29, 2005; 12:30 pm		Nebraska	W 84–68	12–5 (4–2)	United Spirit Arena; Lubbock, TX
Feb 2, 2005; 7:00pm		Colorado	W 97–90	13–5 (5–2)	United Spirit Arena; Lubbock, TX
Feb 5, 2005; 8:00 pm		at No. 15 Oklahoma	W 88–81	14–5 (6–2)	Lloyd Noble Center; Norman, OK
Feb 9, 2005; 8:00 pm		Baylor	W 83–67	15–5 (7–2)	United Spirit Arena; Lubbock, TX
Feb 12, 2005; 3:00 pm		at Iowa State	L 68–81	15–6 (7–3)	Hilton Coliseum; Ames, IA
Feb 14, 2005; 8:00 pm		No. 3 Kansas	W 80–79 ^{2OT}	16–6 (8–3)	United Spirit Arena; Lubbock, TX
Feb 19, 2005; 2:30 pm		at No. 8 Oklahoma State	L 56–85	16–7 (8–4)	Gallagher-Iba Arena; Stillwater, OK
Feb 22, 2005; 7:00 pm		Texas	W 69–65	17–7 (9–4)	United Spirit Arena; Lubbock, TX
Feb 26, 2005; 3:00 pm		at Texas A&M	L 63–85	17–8 (9–5)	Reed Arena; College Station, TX
Mar 2, 2005; 7:00 pm		at Baylor	W 72–66	18–8 (10–5)	Ferrell Center; Waco, TX
Mar 5, 2005; 5:00 pm		No. 20 Oklahoma	L 54–74	18–9 (10–6)	United Spirit Arena; Lubbock, TX
Big 12 Tournament
Mar 11, 2005*		vs. Iowa State; Quarterfinal	W 64–56	19–9	Kemper Arena; Kansas City, MO
Mar 12, 2005*		vs. No. 17 Oklahoma; Semifinal	W 69–63	20–9	Kemper Arena; Kansas City, MO
Mar 13, 2005*		vs. No. 10 Oklahoma State; Championship Game	L 68–72	20–10	Kemper Arena; Kansas City, MO
NCAA Tournament
Mar 17, 2005*	(6 W) No. 24	vs. (11 W) UCLA; First Round	W 78–66	21–10	McKale Center; Tucson, AZ
Mar 19, 2005*	(6 W) No. 24	vs. (3 W) No. 10 Gonzaga; Second Round	W 71–69	22–10	McKale Center; Tucson, AZ
Mar 24, 2005*	(6 W) No. 24	vs. (7 W) West Virginia; Sweet Sixteen	L 60–65	22–11	University Arena; Albuquerque, NM
*Non-conference game. ^{#}Rankings from AP Poll. (#) Tournament seedings in parentheses. W=West. All times are in Central Time.
