= 2004–05 NCAA Division I men's basketball season =

Basketball season

- Preseason AP No. 1: Kansas Jayhawks
- Regular season: November 10, 2004– March 13, 2005
- NCAA Tournament: 2005
- Tournament dates: March 15 – April 4, 2005
- National Championship: Edward Jones Dome; St. Louis, Missouri
- NCAA Champions: North Carolina Tar Heels
- Other champions: South Carolina Gamecocks (NIT)
- Player of the Year (Naismith, Wooden): Andrew Bogut, Utah Utes

The 2004–05 NCAA Division I men's basketball season began on November 10, 2004, progressed through the regular season and conference tournaments, and concluded with the 2005 NCAA Division I men's basketball tournament championship game on April 4, 2005, at the Edward Jones Dome in Saint Louis, Missouri. The North Carolina Tar Heels won their fourth NCAA national championship with a 75–70 victory over the Illinois Fighting Illini.

== Season headlines ==
- The preseason AP All-American team was named on November 9. Chris Paul of Wake Forest was the leading vote-getter (55 of 72 votes). The rest of the team included Lawrence Roberts of Mississippi State (50 votes), Wayne Simien of Kansas (50), Julius Hodge of NC State (41) and Hakim Warrick of Syracuse (33).
- In the 2005 NCAA tournament, Rick Pitino of Louisville became the first head coach to take three different teams to the NCAA tournament Final Four. He had done it previously with Providence in 1987 and Kentucky in 1993.

== Season outlook ==
=== Pre-season polls ===
The top 25 from the AP and ESPN/USA Today Coaches Polls November 11, 2004.

'Associated Press'
Ranking	Team
1	Kansas (25)
2	Wake Forest (22)
3	Georgia Tech (10)
4	North Carolina (10)
5	Illinois (2)
6	Syracuse
7	Oklahoma State (2)
8	Connecticut
9	Kentucky (1)
10	Arizona
11	Duke
12	Mississippi State
13	Michigan State
14	Louisville
15	Maryland
16	Texas
17	Pittsburgh
18	Alabama
19	North Carolina State
20	Notre Dame
21	Wisconsin
22	Washington
23	Florida
24	Memphis
25	Gonzaga

ESPN/USA Today coaches
Ranking	Team
1	Kansas (8)
2	Wake Forest (12)
3	North Carolina (6)
4	Georgia Tech (1)
5	Illinois (1)
6	Syracuse
7	Connecticut
8	Oklahoma State (1)
9	Kentucky
10	Michigan State
11	Arizona (1)
12	Duke
13	Louisville (1)
14	Mississippi State
15	Texas
16	Maryland
17	Pittsburgh
18	Alabama
19	North Carolina State
20	Wisconsin
21	Notre Dame
22	Florida
23	Memphis
24	Washington
25	Stanford

== Conference membership changes ==
These schools joined new conferences for the 2004–05 season.

School	Former conference	New conference
UC Davis Aggies	CCAA (D-II)	NCAA Division I Independent
Longwood Lancers	NCAA Division II independent	NCAA Division I independent
Miami (Fla.) Hurricanes	Big East Conference	Atlantic Coast Conference
North Dakota State Bison	North Central Conference (D-II)	NCAA Division I independent
Northern Colorado Bears	North Central Conference (D-II)	NCAA Division I Independent
South Dakota State Jackrabbits	North Central Conference (D-II)	NCAA Division I independent
Virginia Tech Hokies	Big East Conference	Atlantic Coast Conference

== Regular season ==
=== Conferences ===
==== Conference winners and tournaments ====
Thirty conference seasons concluded with a single-elimination tournament. Generally, all member schools were eligible to participate in their conference tournament regardless of their records, but the Big East did not invite its teams with the worst records to its 2005 tournament. Conference tournament winners received an automatic bid to the 2005 NCAA Division I men's basketball tournament, while a school that won its conference regular season title but did not win its conference tournament was guaranteed a bid to the 2005 National Invitation Tournament unless it received an at-large bid to the NCAA tournament. The Ivy League was the only NCAA Division I conference that did not hold a conference tournament, instead sending its regular-season champion to the NCAA tournament.

Conference	Regular season Winner	Conference Player of the Year	Conference Tournament	Tournament Venue (City)	Tournament Winner
America East Conference	Vermont	Taylor Coppenrath, Vermont	2005 America East men's basketball tournament	Events Center (Vestal, New York) (Except Finals)	Vermont
Atlantic 10 Conference	St. Joseph's (East); George Washington (West)	Pat Carroll, St. Joseph's & Steven Smith, La Salle	2005 Atlantic 10 men's basketball tournament	U.S. Bank Arena (Cincinnati)	George Washington
Atlantic Coast Conference	North Carolina	JJ Redick, Duke	2005 ACC men's basketball tournament	MCI Center (Washington, D.C.)	Duke
Atlantic Sun Conference	Central Florida & Gardner–Webb	Mike Bell, Florida Atlantic	2005 Atlantic Sun men's basketball tournament	Curb Event Center (Nashville, Tennessee)	Central Florida
Big 12 Conference	Kansas & Oklahoma	Wayne Simien, Kansas	2005 Big 12 men's basketball tournament	Kemper Arena (Kansas City, Missouri)	Oklahoma State
Big East Conference	Boston College & Connecticut	Hakim Warrick, Syracuse	2005 Big East men's basketball tournament	Madison Square Garden (New York City)	Syracuse
Big Sky Conference	Portland State	Seamus Boxley, Portland State	2005 Big Sky men's basketball tournament	Memorial Coliseum (Portland, Oregon) (Semifinals and Finals)	Montana
Big South Conference	Winthrop	Pele Paelay, Coastal Carolina	2005 Big South Conference men's basketball tournament	Winthrop Coliseum (Rock Hill, South Carolina) (Semifinals and Finals)	Winthrop
Big Ten Conference	Illinois	Dee Brown, Illinois	2005 Big Ten Conference men's basketball tournament	United Center (Chicago)	Illinois
Big West Conference	Pacific	David Doubley, Pacific	2005 Big West Conference men's basketball tournament	Anaheim Convention Center (Anaheim, California)	Utah State
Colonial Athletic Association	Old Dominion	Alex Loughton, Old Dominion	2005 CAA men's basketball tournament	Richmond Coliseum (Richmond, Virginia)	Old Dominion
Conference USA	Louisville	Eddie Basden, Charlotte	2005 Conference USA men's basketball tournament	FedExForum (Memphis, Tennessee)	Louisville
Horizon League	Wisconsin-Milwaukee	Ed McCants, Wisconsin-Milwaukee	2005 Horizon League men's basketball tournament	U.S. Cellular Arena (Milwaukee, Wisconsin) (Except First Round)	Wisconsin-Milwaukee
Ivy League	Penn	Tim Begley, Penn	No Tournament		
Metro Atlantic Athletic Conference	Niagara & Rider	Juan Mendez, Niagara	2005 MAAC men's basketball tournament	HSBC Arena (Buffalo, New York)	Niagara
Mid-American Conference	Miami (OH) (East); Western Michigan & Toledo (West)	Turner Battle, Buffalo	2005 MAC men's basketball tournament	Gund Arena (Cleveland, Ohio)	Ohio
Mid-Continent Conference	Oral Roberts	Caleb Green, Oral Roberts	2005 Mid-Continent Conference men's basketball tournament	John Q. Hammons Arena (Tulsa, Oklahoma)	Oakland
Mid-Eastern Athletic Conference	Delaware State	Chakowby Hicks, Norfolk State	2005 Mid-Eastern Athletic Conference men's basketball tournament	Richmond Coliseum (Richmond, Virginia)	Delaware State
Missouri Valley Conference	Southern Illinois	Darren Brooks, Southern Illinois	2005 Missouri Valley Conference men's basketball tournament	Savvis Center (St. Louis, Missouri)	Southern Illinois
Mountain West Conference	Utah	Andrew Bogut, Utah	2005 MWC men's basketball tournament	Pepsi Center (Denver, Colorado)	New Mexico
Northeast Conference	Monmouth	Blake Hamilton, Monmouth	2005 Northeast Conference men's basketball tournament	Campus Sites	Fairleigh Dickinson
Ohio Valley Conference	Tennessee Tech	Willie Jenkins, Tennessee Tech	2005 Ohio Valley Conference men's basketball tournament	Gaylord Entertainment Center (Nashville, Tennessee) (Semifinals and Finals)	Eastern Kentucky
Pacific-10 Conference	Arizona	Ike Diogu, Arizona State	2005 Pacific-10 Conference men's basketball tournament	Staples Center (Los Angeles)	Washington
Patriot League	Holy Cross	Kevin Hamilton, Holy Cross	2005 Patriot League men's basketball tournament	Campus Sites	Bucknell
Southeastern Conference	Kentucky (East); Alabama & LSU (West)	Brandon Bass, LSU	2005 SEC men's basketball tournament	Gaylord Entertainment Center (Nashville, Tennessee)	Florida
Southern Conference	Chattanooga (North); Davidson (South)	Brendan Winters, Davidson	2005 Southern Conference men's basketball tournament	McKenzie Arena (Chattanooga, Tennessee)	Chattanooga
Southland Conference	Southeastern Louisiana & Northwestern State	Joe Thompson, Sam Houston State	2005 Southland Conference men's basketball tournament	Prather Coliseum (Natchitoches, Louisiana) (Finals)	Southeastern Louisiana
Southwestern Athletic Conference	Alabama A&M	Obie Trotter, Alabama A&M	2005 Southwestern Athletic Conference men's basketball tournament	Birmingham Jefferson Convention Complex (Birmingham, Alabama)	Alabama A&M
Sun Belt Conference	Arkansas-Little Rock (East); Denver (West)	Yemi Nicholson, Denver	2005 Sun Belt men's basketball tournament	UNT Coliseum (Denton, Texas)	Louisiana-Lafayette
West Coast Conference	Gonzaga	Ronny Turiaf, Gonzaga	2005 West Coast Conference men's basketball tournament	Leavey Center (Santa Clara, California)	Gonzaga
Western Athletic Conference	Nevada	Nick Fazekas, Nevada	2005 WAC men's basketball tournament	Lawlor Events Center (Reno, Nevada)	UTEP

==== Conference standings ====
2004–05 America East Conference men's basketball standings
	Conf.				Overall
Team	W		L	PCT	W		L	PCT
Vermont †	16	–	2	.889	25	–	7	.781
Northeastern	15	–	3	.833	21	–	10	.677
Boston University	14	–	4	.778	20	–	9	.690
Albany	9	–	9	.500	13	–	15	.464
Binghamton	8	–	10	.444	12	–	17	.414
Maine	8	–	10	.444	14	–	15	.483
Stony Brook	6	–	12	.333	12	–	17	.414
New Hampshire	5	–	13	.278	9	–	19	.321
UMBC	5	–	13	.278	11	–	18	.379
Hartford	4	–	14	.222	8	–	20	.286
† 2005 America East tournament winner

2004–05 ACC men's basketball standings
	Conf.				Overall
Team	W		L	PCT	W		L	PCT
No. 2 North Carolina	14	–	2	.875	33	–	4	.892
No. 5 Wake Forest	13	–	3	.813	27	–	6	.818
No. 3 Duke†	11	–	5	.688	27	–	6	.818
Virginia Tech	8	–	8	.500	16	–	14	.533
No. 25 Georgia Tech	8	–	8	.500	20	–	12	.625
Miami (FL)	7	–	9	.438	16	–	13	.552
NC State	7	–	9	.438	21	–	14	.600
Maryland	7	–	9	.438	19	–	13	.594
Clemson	5	–	11	.313	16	–	16	.500
Florida State	4	–	12	.250	14	–	15	.483
Virginia	4	–	12	.250	14	–	15	.483
† 2005 ACC tournament winner Rankings from AP Poll

2004–05 Atlantic 10 men's basketball standings
	Conf.				Overall
Team	W		L	PCT	W		L	PCT
East
Saint Joseph's	14	–	2	.875	24	–	12	.667
Temple	11	–	5	.688	16	–	14	.533
UMass	9	–	7	.563	16	–	12	.571
Fordham	8	–	8	.500	13	–	16	.448
Rhode Island	4	–	12	.250	6	–	22	.214
St. Bonaventure	1	–	15	.063	2	–	26	.071
West
George Washington †	11	–	5	.688	22	–	8	.733
Dayton	10	–	6	.625	18	–	11	.621
Xavier	10	–	6	.625	17	–	12	.586
Richmond	8	–	8	.500	14	–	15	.483
La Salle	5	–	11	.313	10	–	19	.345
Duquesne	5	–	11	.313	8	–	22	.267
† 2005 Atlantic 10 Tournament winner Rankings from AP Poll

2004–05 Atlantic Sun men's basketball standings
	Conf.				Overall
Team	W		L	PCT	W		L	PCT
UCF †	13	–	7	.650	24	–	9	.727
Gardner-Webb	13	–	7	.650	18	–	12	.600
Belmont	12	–	8	.600	14	–	16	.467
Lipscomb	11	–	9	.550	16	–	12	.571
Mercer	11	–	9	.550	16	–	12	.571
Jacksonville	11	–	9	.550	16	–	13	.552
Georgia State	11	–	9	.550	14	–	15	.483
Troy State	10	–	10	.500	12	–	18	.400
Florida Atlantic	10	–	10	.500	10	–	17	.370
Stetson	8	–	12	.400	10	–	17	.370
Campbell	0	–	20	.000	2	–	25	.074
† 2005 Atlantic Sun Tournament winner As of March 1, 2005; Rankings from AP Poll

2004–05 Big 12 men's basketball standings
	Conf.				Overall
Team	W		L	PCT	W		L	PCT
No. 17 Oklahoma	12	–	4	.750	25	–	8	.758
No. 12 Kansas	12	–	4	.750	23	–	7	.767
No. 6 Oklahoma State †	11	–	5	.688	26	–	7	.788
No. 24 Texas Tech	10	–	6	.625	22	–	11	.667
Iowa State	9	–	7	.563	19	–	12	.613
Texas	9	–	7	.563	20	–	11	.645
Texas A&M	8	–	8	.500	21	–	10	.677
Missouri	7	–	9	.438	16	–	17	.485
Nebraska	7	–	9	.438	14	–	14	.500
Kansas State	6	–	10	.375	17	–	12	.586
Colorado	4	–	12	.250	14	–	16	.467
Baylor	1	–	15	.063	9	–	19	.321
† 2005 Big 12 Tournament winner Rankings from AP poll

2004–05 Big East men's basketball standings
	Conf.				Overall
Team	W		L	PCT	W		L	PCT
No. 14 Boston College	13	–	3	.813	25	–	5	.833
No. 13 Connecticut	13	–	3	.813	23	–	8	.742
No. 19 Villanova	11	–	5	.688	24	–	8	.750
Pittsburgh	10	–	6	.625	20	–	9	.690
Notre Dame	9	–	7	.563	17	–	12	.586
Georgetown	8	–	8	.500	19	–	13	.594
West Virginia	8	–	8	.500	24	–	11	.686
Providence	4	–	12	.250	14	–	17	.452
Seton Hall	4	–	12	.250	12	–	16	.429
Rutgers	2	–	14	.125	10	–	19	.345
St. John's*	3	–	13	.188	9	–	18	.333
No. 11 Syracuse†**	0	–	5	.000	12	–	7	.632
† 2005 Big East tournament winner As of April 4, 2005; Rankings from AP Poll; *Not eligible for the 2005 Big East tournament due to sanctions against the program. **Syracuse had 15 regular season games vacated due to sanctions against the program; Syracuse′s disputed record was 27–7, 11–5.

2004–05 Big Sky men's basketball standings
	Conf.				Overall
Team	W		L	PCT	W		L	PCT
Portland State	11	–	3	.786	19	–	9	.679
Montana State	9	–	5	.643	14	–	14	.500
Montana †	9	–	5	.643	18	–	13	.581
Sacramento State	8	–	6	.571	12	–	16	.429
Weber State	7	–	7	.500	14	–	16	.467
Eastern Washington	5	–	9	.357	8	–	20	.286
Northern Arizona	4	–	10	.286	11	–	17	.393
Idaho State	3	–	11	.214	9	–	18	.333
† Conference tournament winner

2004–05 Big South Conference men's basketball standings
	Conf.				Overall
Team	W		L	PCT	W		L	PCT
Winthrop †	15	–	1	.938	27	–	6	.818
Liberty	11	–	5	.688	13	–	15	.464
UNC Asheville	8	–	8	.500	11	–	17	.393
Birmingham–Southern	7	–	9	.438	16	–	14	.533
Charleston Southern	7	–	9	.438	13	–	17	.433
Radford	7	–	9	.438	12	–	16	.429
High Point	7	–	9	.438	13	–	18	.419
Coastal Carolina	7	–	9	.438	10	–	19	.345
VMI	3	–	13	.188	9	–	18	.333
† 2005 Big South tournament winner Rankings from AP Poll

2004–05 Big Ten Conference men's basketball standings
	Conf.				Overall
Team	W		L	PCT	W		L	PCT
No. 1 Illinois †	15	–	1	.938	37	–	2	.949
No. 15 Michigan State	13	–	3	.813	26	–	6	.813
No. 20 Wisconsin	11	–	5	.688	25	–	9	.735
Indiana	10	–	6	.625	15	–	14	.517
Minnesota	10	–	6	.625	21	–	11	.656
Ohio State	8	–	8	.500	20	–	12	.625
Iowa	7	–	9	.438	21	–	12	.636
Northwestern	6	–	10	.375	15	–	16	.484
Michigan	4	–	12	.250	13	–	18	.419
Purdue	3	–	13	.188	7	–	21	.250
Penn State	1	–	15	.063	7	–	23	.233
† 2005 Big Ten tournament winner As of March 15, 2005; Rankings from AP Poll

2004–05 Big West men's basketball standings
	Conf.				Overall
Team	W		L	PCT	W		L	PCT
No. 22 Pacific	18	–	0	1.000	27	–	4	.871
Utah State †	13	–	5	.722	24	–	8	.750
Cal State Fullerton	12	–	6	.667	21	–	11	.656
Cal State Northridge	12	–	6	.667	18	–	13	.581
UC Irvine	8	–	10	.444	16	–	13	.552
Long Beach State	7	–	11	.389	10	–	20	.333
UC Santa Barbara	7	–	11	.389	11	–	18	.379
Idaho	6	–	12	.333	8	–	22	.267
UC Riverside	4	–	14	.222	9	–	19	.321
Cal Poly	3	–	15	.167	5	–	22	.185
† 2005 Big West tournament winner As of April 10, 2005; Rankings from AP poll

2004–05 CAA men's basketball standings
	Conf.				Overall
Team	W		L	PCT	W		L	PCT
Old Dominion †	15	–	3	.833	28	–	6	.824
UNC Wilmington	13	–	5	.722	19	–	10	.655
VCU	13	–	5	.722	19	–	13	.594
Hofstra	12	–	6	.667	21	–	9	.700
Drexel	12	–	6	.667	17	–	12	.586
George Mason	10	–	8	.556	16	–	13	.552
Delaware	7	–	11	.389	11	–	20	.355
William & Mary	3	–	15	.167	8	–	21	.276
James Madison	3	–	15	.167	6	–	22	.214
Towson	2	–	16	.111	5	–	24	.172
† 2005 CAA tournament winner Rankings from AP poll

2004–05 Conference USA men's basketball standings
	Conf.				Overall
Team	W		L	PCT	W		L	PCT
No. 4 Louisville †	14	–	2	.875	33	–	5	.868
Charlotte	12	–	4	.750	21	–	8	.724
No. 23 Cincinnati	12	–	4	.750	25	–	8	.758
UAB	10	–	6	.625	22	–	11	.667
DePaul	10	–	6	.625	20	–	11	.645
Houston	9	–	7	.563	18	–	14	.563
Memphis	9	–	7	.563	22	–	16	.579
TCU	8	–	8	.500	21	–	14	.600
Marquette	7	–	9	.438	19	–	12	.613
Saint Louis	6	–	10	.375	9	–	21	.300
South Florida	5	–	11	.313	14	–	16	.467
Tulane	4	–	12	.250	10	–	18	.357
East Carolina	4	–	12	.250	9	–	19	.321
Southern Miss	2	–	14	.125	11	–	17	.393
† 2005 Conference USA Tournament winner Rankings from AP Poll

2004–05 Horizon League men's basketball standings
	Conf.				Overall
Team	W		L	PCT	W		L	PCT
Milwaukee †	14	–	2	.875	26	–	6	.813
Green Bay	10	–	6	.625	17	–	11	.607
Detroit	9	–	7	.563	14	–	16	.467
Loyola Chicago	8	–	8	.500	13	–	17	.433
Illinois-Chicago	8	–	8	.500	15	–	14	.517
Wright State	8	–	8	.500	15	–	15	.500
Butler	7	–	9	.438	13	–	15	.464
Cleveland State	6	–	10	.375	9	–	17	.346
Youngstown State	2	–	14	.125	5	–	23	.179
† 2005 Horizon League Tournament winner

2004–05 Ivy League men's basketball standings
	Conf.				Overall
Team	W		L	PCT	W		L	PCT
Penn	13	–	1	.929	20	–	9	.690
Cornell	8	–	6	.571	13	–	14	.481
Harvard	7	–	7	.500	12	–	15	.444
Yale	7	–	7	.500	11	–	16	.407
Dartmouth	7	–	7	.500	10	–	17	.370
Princeton	6	–	8	.429	15	–	13	.536
Brown	5	–	9	.357	12	–	16	.429
Columbia	3	–	11	.214	12	–	15	.444
Rankings from AP Poll

2004–05 MAAC men's basketball standings
	Conf.				Overall
Team	W		L	PCT	W		L	PCT
Niagara †	13	–	5	.722	20	–	10	.667
Rider	13	–	5	.722	19	–	11	.633
Fairfield	11	–	7	.611	15	–	15	.500
Saint Peter's	10	–	8	.556	15	–	13	.536
Iona	9	–	9	.500	15	–	16	.484
Manhattan	9	–	9	.500	15	–	14	.517
Canisius	8	–	10	.444	11	–	18	.379
Marist	8	–	10	.444	11	–	17	.393
Loyola (MD)	5	–	13	.278	6	–	22	.214
Siena	4	–	14	.222	6	–	24	.200
† 2005 MAAC tournament winner Rankings from AP Poll

2004–05 Mid-American Conference men's basketball standings
	Conf.				Overall
Team	W		L	PCT	W		L	PCT
East
Miami (OH)	12	–	6	.667	19	–	11	.633
Buffalo	11	–	7	.611	23	–	10	.697
Ohio †	11	–	7	.611	21	–	11	.656
Akron	11	–	7	.611	19	–	10	.655
Kent State	11	–	7	.611	20	–	13	.606
Marshall	3	–	15	.167	6	–	22	.214
West
Western Michigan	11	–	7	.611	20	–	13	.606
Toledo	11	–	7	.611	16	–	13	.552
Bowling Green	10	–	8	.556	18	–	11	.621
Ball State	10	–	8	.556	15	–	13	.536
Northern Illinois	7	–	11	.389	11	–	17	.393
Eastern Michigan	5	–	13	.278	12	–	18	.400
Central Michigan	4	–	14	.222	10	–	18	.357
† 2005 MAC tournament winner Rankings from AP Poll

2004–05 Mid-Continent Conference men's basketball standings
	Conf.				Overall
Team	W		L	PCT	W		L	PCT
Oral Roberts	13	–	3	.813	25	–	8	.758
UMKC	12	–	4	.750	16	–	12	.571
Valparaiso	10	–	6	.625	15	–	16	.484
IUPUI	9	–	7	.563	16	–	13	.552
Western Illinois	7	–	9	.438	11	–	17	.393
Chicago State	7	–	9	.438	9	–	19	.321
Oakland †	7	–	9	.438	13	–	19	.406
Southern Utah	6	–	10	.375	13	–	15	.464
Centenary	1	–	15	.063	3	–	24	.111
† 2005 Mid-Con Tournament winner Rankings from AP Poll

2004–05 MEAC men's basketball standings
	Conf.				Overall
Team	W		L	PCT	W		L	PCT
Delaware State †	14	–	4	.778	19	–	14	.576
Hampton	13	–	5	.722	17	–	13	.567
Coppin State	13	–	5	.722	14	–	15	.483
South Carolina State	11	–	7	.611	19	–	12	.613
Norfolk State	11	–	7	.611	13	–	14	.481
Morgan State	11	–	7	.611	14	–	16	.467
Florida A&M	10	–	8	.556	14	–	15	.483
Bethune–Cookman	8	–	10	.444	13	–	17	.433
North Carolina A&T	5	–	13	.278	6	–	24	.200
Howard	2	–	16	.111	5	–	23	.179
Maryland Eastern Shore	1	–	17	.056	2	–	26	.071
† 2005 MEAC tournament winner Rankings from AP Poll

2004–05 Missouri Valley Conference men's basketball standings
	Conf.				Overall
Team	W		L	PCT	W		L	PCT
Southern Illinois	15	–	3	.833	27	–	8	.771
Wichita State	12	–	6	.667	22	–	10	.688
Creighton †	11	–	7	.611	23	–	11	.676
Northern Iowa	11	–	7	.611	21	–	11	.656
Southwest Missouri State	10	–	8	.556	19	–	13	.594
Illinois State	8	–	10	.444	17	–	13	.567
Drake	7	–	11	.389	13	–	16	.448
Bradley	6	–	12	.333	13	–	15	.464
Indiana State	5	–	13	.278	11	–	20	.355
Evansville	5	–	13	.278	11	–	17	.393
† 2005 Missouri Valley Tournament winner Rankings from AP Poll

2004–05 Mountain West Conference men's basketball standings
	Conf.				Overall
Team	W		L	PCT	W		L	PCT
No. 18 Utah	13	–	1	.929	29	–	6	.829
New Mexico †	10	–	4	.714	26	–	7	.788
Air Force	9	–	5	.643	18	–	12	.600
UNLV	7	–	7	.500	17	–	14	.548
Wyoming	7	–	7	.500	15	–	13	.536
San Diego State	4	–	10	.286	11	–	18	.379
BYU	3	–	11	.214	9	–	21	.300
Colorado State	3	–	11	.214	11	–	17	.393
† 2005 Mountain West tournament winner Rankings from AP Poll

2004–05 Northeast Conference men's basketball standings
	Conf.				Overall
Team	W		L	PCT	W		L	PCT
Monmouth	14	–	4	.778	16	–	13	.552
Fairleigh Dickinson †	13	–	5	.722	20	–	13	.606
Robert Morris	11	–	7	.611	14	–	15	.483
Long Island	10	–	8	.556	14	–	15	.483
Saint Francis (PA)	10	–	8	.556	15	–	13	.536
Wagner	10	–	8	.556	13	–	17	.433
St. Francis (NY)	9	–	9	.500	13	–	15	.464
Central Connecticut	8	–	10	.444	12	–	16	.429
Quinnipiac	6	–	12	.333	10	–	17	.370
Mount St. Mary's	5	–	13	.278	7	–	20	.259
Sacred Heart	3	–	15	.167	4	–	23	.148
† 2005 NEC tournament winner

2004–05 Ohio Valley Conference men's basketball standings
	Conf.				Overall
Team	W		L	PCT	W		L	PCT
Tennessee Tech	12	–	4	.750	18	–	11	.621
Eastern Kentucky †	11	–	5	.688	22	–	9	.710
Murray State	11	–	5	.688	17	–	11	.607
Samford	10	–	6	.625	15	–	13	.536
Austin Peay	9	–	7	.563	13	–	19	.406
Southeast Missouri State	9	–	7	.563	15	–	14	.517
Tennessee State	9	–	7	.563	14	–	17	.452
Eastern Illinois	7	–	9	.438	12	–	16	.429
Morehead State	5	–	11	.313	11	–	16	.407
UT Martin	3	–	13	.188	6	–	21	.222
Jacksonville State	2	–	14	.125	7	–	22	.241
† 2005 Ohio Valley Conference tournament winner Rankings from AP Poll

2004–05 Pacific-10 Conference men's basketball standings
	Conf.				Overall
Team	W		L	PCT	W		L	PCT
No. 9 Arizona	15	–	3	.833	30	–	7	.811
Washington†	14	–	4	.778	29	–	6	.829
No. 18 UCLA ^{1}	11	–	7	.611	18	–	11	.621
Stanford	11	–	7	.611	18	–	13	.581
Oregon State	8	–	10	.444	17	–	15	.531
Arizona State ^{1}	7	–	11	.389	18	–	14	.563
Washington State	7	–	11	.389	12	–	16	.429
Oregon ^{1}	6	–	12	.333	14	–	13	.519
California	6	–	12	.333	13	–	16	.448
USC	5	–	13	.278	12	–	17	.414
† Conference tournament winner As of April 8, 2005; Rankings from Coaches Poll^{1} Holds tie-breaker

2004–05 Patriot League men's basketball standings
	Conf.				Overall
Team	W		L	PCT	W		L	PCT
Holy Cross	13	–	1	.929	25	–	7	.781
Bucknell †	10	–	4	.714	23	–	10	.697
American	8	–	6	.571	16	–	12	.571
Lehigh	7	–	7	.500	14	–	15	.483
Colgate	7	–	7	.500	12	–	16	.429
Navy	5	–	9	.357	9	–	19	.321
Lafayette	5	–	9	.357	9	–	19	.321
Army	1	–	13	.071	3	–	24	.111
† 2005 Patriot League tournament winner

2004–05 Southeastern Conference men's basketball standings
	Conf.				Overall
Team	W		L	PCT	W		L	PCT
East
No. 7 Kentucky	14	–	2	.875	28	–	6	.824
No. 16 Florida †	12	–	4	.750	24	–	8	.750
Vanderbilt	8	–	8	.500	20	–	14	.588
South Carolina	7	–	9	.438	20	–	13	.606
Tennessee	6	–	10	.375	14	–	17	.452
Georgia	2	–	14	.125	8	–	20	.286
West
No. 21 Alabama	12	–	4	.750	24	–	8	.750
LSU	12	–	4	.750	20	–	10	.667
Mississippi State	9	–	7	.563	23	–	11	.676
Arkansas	6	–	10	.375	18	–	12	.600
Ole Miss	4	–	12	.250	14	–	17	.452
Auburn	4	–	12	.250	14	–	17	.452
† 2005 SEC tournament winner Rankings from AP Poll

2004–05 Southern Conference men's basketball standings
	Conf.				Overall
Team	W		L	PCT	W		L	PCT
North
Chattanooga †	10	–	6	.625	20	–	11	.645
UNC Greensboro	9	–	7	.563	18	–	12	.600
Appalachian State	9	–	7	.563	18	–	12	.600
Elon	5	–	11	.313	8	–	23	.258
East Tennessee State	4	–	12	.250	10	–	19	.345
Western Carolina	3	–	13	.188	8	–	22	.267
South
Davidson	16	–	0	1.000	23	–	9	.719
College of Charleston	10	–	6	.625	18	–	10	.643
Georgia Southern	10	–	6	.625	18	–	13	.581
Furman	9	–	7	.563	16	–	13	.552
Wofford	7	–	9	.438	14	–	14	.500
The Citadel	4	–	12	.250	12	–	16	.429
† SoCon Tournament winner As of April 30, 2005; Rankings from AP poll

2004–05 Southland Conference men's basketball standings
	Conf.				Overall
Team	W		L	PCT	W		L	PCT
Southeastern Louisiana †	13	–	3	.813	24	–	9	.727
Northwestern State	13	–	3	.813	21	–	12	.636
Sam Houston State	11	–	5	.688	18	–	12	.600
UTSA	10	–	6	.625	15	–	13	.536
Lamar	9	–	7	.563	18	–	11	.621
Texas State	8	–	8	.500	14	–	14	.500
McNeese State	8	–	8	.500	13	–	15	.464
Texas–Arlington	7	–	9	.438	13	–	15	.464
Stephen F. Austin	6	–	10	.375	12	–	15	.444
Louisiana–Monroe	2	–	14	.125	8	–	19	.296
Nicholls State	1	–	15	.063	6	–	21	.222
† 2005 Southland tournament winner

2004–05 SWAC men's basketball standings
	Conf.				Overall
Team	W		L	PCT	W		L	PCT
Alabama A&M †	12	–	6	.667	18	–	14	.563
Grambling State	11	–	7	.611	14	–	12	.538
Alabama State	11	–	7	.611	15	–	15	.500
Mississippi Valley State	11	–	7	.611	13	–	15	.464
Jackson State	10	–	8	.556	15	–	17	.469
Southern	10	–	8	.556	14	–	15	.483
Alcorn State	6	–	12	.333	7	–	22	.241
Texas Southern	9	–	9	.500	11	–	15	.423
Arkansas–Pine Bluff	5	–	13	.278	7	–	21	.250
Prairie View A&M	5	–	13	.278	5	–	23	.179
† 2005 SWAC tournament winner Rankings from AP Poll

2004–05 Sun Belt Conference men's basketball standings
	Conf.				Overall
Team	W		L	PCT	W		L	PCT
East
Little Rock	10	–	4	.714	18	–	10	.643
Western Kentucky	9	–	5	.643	22	–	9	.710
Middle Tennessee	7	–	7	.500	19	–	12	.613
Arkansas State	7	–	7	.500	16	–	13	.552
Florida International	4	–	10	.286	13	–	17	.433
West
Denver	12	–	3	.800	20	–	11	.645
Louisiana–Lafayette †	11	–	4	.733	20	–	11	.645
New Orleans	7	–	8	.467	13	–	17	.433
South Alabama	6	–	9	.400	10	–	18	.357
North Texas	6	–	9	.400	14	–	14	.500
New Mexico State	1	–	14	.067	6	–	24	.200
† 2005 Sun Belt Conference tournament winner Rankings from AP poll

2004–05 West Coast Conference men's basketball standings
	Conf.				Overall
Team	W		L	PCT	W		L	PCT
No. 10 Gonzaga	12	–	2	.857	26	–	5	.839
Saint Mary's	11	–	3	.786	25	–	9	.735
Santa Clara	7	–	7	.500	15	–	16	.484
San Diego	7	–	7	.500	16	–	13	.552
Pepperdine	6	–	8	.429	17	–	14	.548
San Francisco	6	–	8	.429	17	–	14	.548
Portland	4	–	10	.286	15	–	15	.500
Loyola Marymount	3	–	11	.214	11	–	17	.393
† 2005 WCC tournament winner Rankings from AP Poll

2004–05 WAC men's basketball standings
	Conf.				Overall
Team	W		L	PCT	W		L	PCT
Nevada	16	–	2	.889	25	–	7	.781
UTEP †	14	–	4	.778	27	–	8	.771
Rice	12	–	6	.667	19	–	12	.613
Fresno State	9	–	9	.500	16	–	14	.533
Louisiana Tech	9	–	9	.500	14	–	15	.483
SMU	9	–	9	.500	14	–	14	.500
Hawaii	7	–	11	.389	16	–	13	.552
Boise State	6	–	12	.333	16	–	18	.471
Tulsa	5	–	13	.278	9	–	20	.310
San Jose State	3	–	15	.167	6	–	23	.207
† 2005 WAC tournament winner

=== Division I independents ===
Ten schools played as Division I independents. However, Longwood, North Dakota State, Northern Colorado, South Dakota State, UC Davis, and Utah Valley were making a transition from NCAA Division II to NCAA Division I during the season and were not yet considered full Division I schools.

2004–05 NCAA Division I men's basketball independents standings
	Conf.				Overall
Team	W		L	PCT	W		L	PCT
Texas A&M–Corpus Christi	-	–	-	–	20	–	8	.714
North Dakota State		–		–	16	–	12	.571
Utah Valley	-	–	-	–	16	–	12	.571
Texas–Pan American	-	–	-	–	12	–	16	.429
UC Davis	-	–	-	–	11	–	17	.393
South Dakota State		–		–	9	–	20	.310
Northern Colorado	-	–	-	–	8	–	21	.276
IPFW	-	–	-	–	7	–	22	.241
Longwood	-	–	-	–	1	–	30	.032
Savannah State	-	–	-	–	0	–	28	.000
Rankings from AP Poll

=== Informal championships ===
Conference	Regular season winner	Most Valuable Player
Philadelphia Big 5	Temple & Villanova	Pat Carroll, Saint Joseph's

Temple and Villanova finished with 3–1 records in head-to-head competition among the Philadelphia Big 5.

=== Statistical leaders ===
Source for additional stats categories

Points per game			Rebounds per game			Assists per game			Steals per game		
Player	School	PPG	Player	School	RPG	Player	School	APG	Player	School	SPG
Keydren Clark	St. Peter's	25.8	Paul Millsap	LA Tech	12.4	Damitrius Coleman	Mercer	8.0*	Obie Trotter	Alabama A&M	3.9
Taylor Coppenrath	Vermont	25.1	Andrew Bogut	Utah	12.2	Will Funn	Portland St.	8.0*	Chakowby Hicks	Norfolk St.	3.4
Juan Mendez	Niagara	23.5	Lance Allred	Weber St.	12.0	Marcus Williams	UConn	7.8	Keydren Clark	St. Peter's	3.3
Rob Monroe	Quinnipiac	22.7	Michael Harris	Rice	11.7	Walker Russell	Jacksonville St.	7.3	Hosea Butler	Miss. Valley St.	3.3
Bo McCalebb	New Orleans	22.6	Dwayne Jones	St. Joseph's	11.6	José Juan Barea	Northeastern	7.3	Eddie Basden	Charlotte	3.2

Blocked shots per game			Field goal percentage			Three-point FG percentage			Free throw percentage		
Player	School	BPG	Player	School	FG%	Player	School	3FG%	Player	School	FT%
Deng Gai	Fairfield	5.5	Bruce Brown	Hampton	66.2	Salim Stoudamire	Arizona	50.4	Blake Ahearn	Missouri St.	94.7
Shawn James	Northeastern	5.4	Nate Harris	Utah St.	65.2	Will Whittington	Marist	49.2	JJ Redick	Duke	93.8
Shelden Williams	Duke	3.7	Eric Williams	Wake Forest	63.0	Dennis Trammell	Ball St.	48.4	Vince Greene	Illinois St.	92.0
Kyle Hines	UNC-Greensboro	3.5	Chad McKnight	Morehead St.	63.0	Chris Lofton	Tennessee	46.5	Salim Stoudamire	Arizona	91.0
Dwayne Jones	St. Joseph's	3.0	Aaron Andrews	Morgan St.	62.5	Drake Diener	DePaul	46.2	Jamaal Hilliard	Lafayette	91.0

* Coleman and Funn tied for the national assists lead. Each player had 224 assists in 28 games.

== Post-season tournaments ==
=== NCAA tournament ===
The NCAA Tournament tipped off on March 15, 2005 with the opening round game in Dayton, Ohio, and concluded on April 4 at the Edward Jones Dome in St. Louis, MO. A total of 65 teams entered the tournament. Thirty of the teams earned automatic bids by winning their conference tournaments. The automatic bid of the Ivy League, which does not conduct a post-season tournament, went to its regular season champion. The remaining 34 teams were granted "at-large" bids, which are extended by the NCAA Selection Committee. The Big East Conference led the way with eight bids. North Carolina won their fourth NCAA title, beating Illinois 75–70 in the final. North Carolina forward Sean May was named the tournament's Most Outstanding Player.

==== Final Four – St. Louis, Missouri – Edward Jones Dome ====
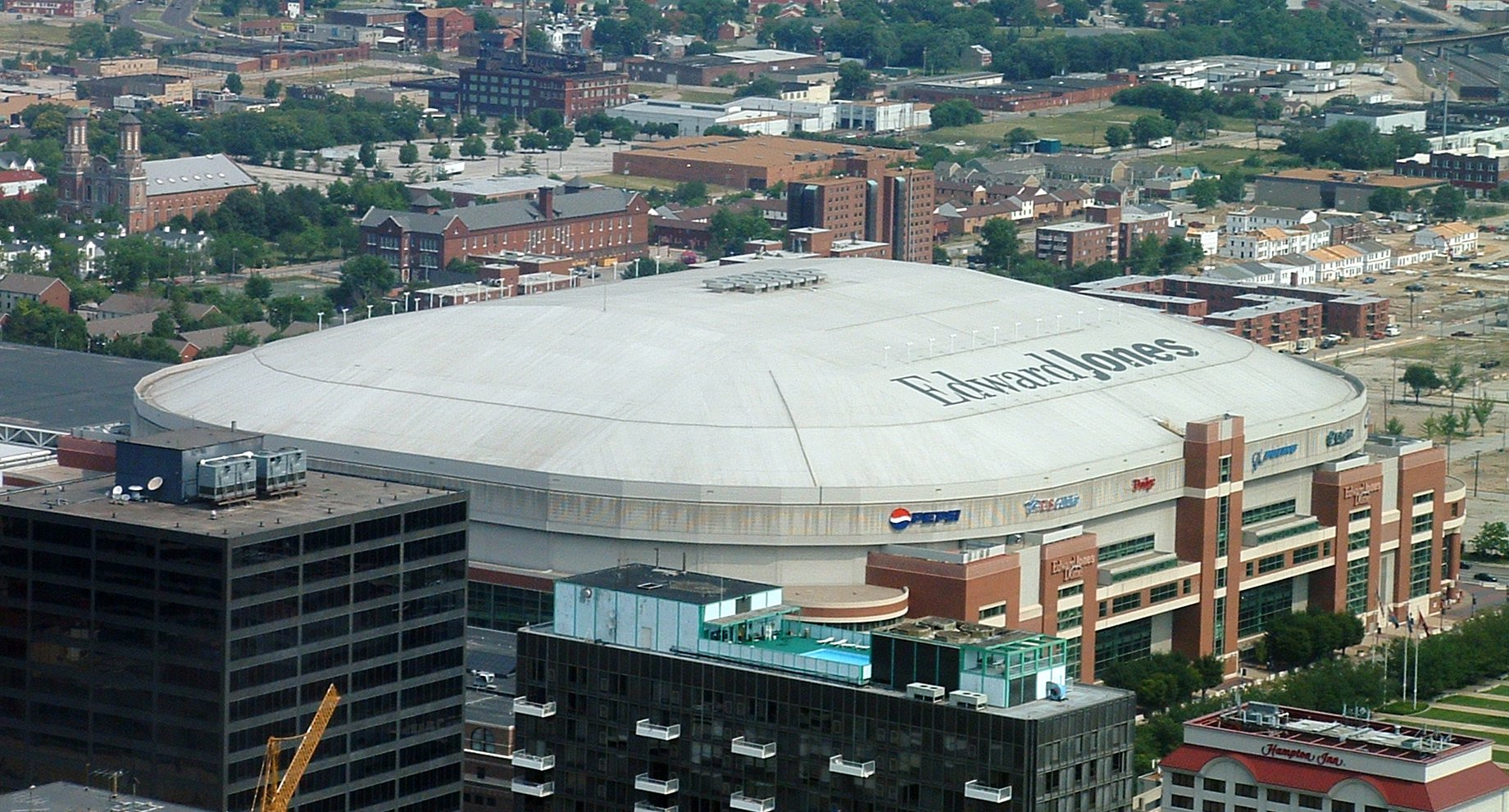
The Edward Jones Dome in St. Louis, Missouri, was the site of the Final Four and Championship game to end the 2004–05 season.

National semifinals
M1	Illinois	72
W4	Louisville	57
E1	North Carolina	87
S5	Michigan State	71

National championship game
M1	Illinois	70
E1	North Carolina	75

=== National Invitation tournament ===
After the NCAA Tournament field was announced, the National Invitation Tournament invited 32 teams to participate, reducing the field's size from 40. Eight teams were given automatic bids for winning their conference regular seasons, and 24 other teams were also invited. Dave Odom's South Carolina Gamecocks won the title, defeating the Saint Joseph's Hawks 60–57 in the championship game. The Gamecocks' Carlos Powell was named tournament MVP.

==== NIT Semifinals & Final ====
Semifinals
Maryland	67
South Carolina	75
Saint Joseph's	70
Memphis	58

Final
South Carolina	60
Saint Joseph's	57

== Award winners ==
=== Consensus All-American teams ===
Consensus First Team
Player	Position	Class	Team
Andrew Bogut	C	Sophomore	Utah
Wayne Simien	F	Senior	Kansas
Hakim Warrick	F	Senior	Syracuse
JJ Redick	G	Junior	Duke
Chris Paul	G	Sophomore	Wake Forest
Dee Brown	G	Junior	Illinois

Consensus Second Team
Player	Position	Class	Team
Luther Head	G	Senior	Illinois
Sean May	C	Junior	North Carolina
Salim Stoudamire	G	Senior	Arizona
Ike Diogu	F	Junior	Arizona State
Deron Williams	G	Junior	Illinois

=== Major player of the year awards ===
- Wooden Award: Andrew Bogut, Utah
- Naismith Award: Andrew Bogut, Utah
- Associated Press Player of the Year: Andrew Bogut, Utah
- NABC Player of the Year: Andrew Bogut, Utah
- Oscar Robertson Trophy (USBWA): Andrew Bogut, Utah
- Adolph Rupp Trophy: JJ Redick, Duke
- CBS/Chevrolet Player of the Year: Andrew Bogut, Utah
- Sporting News Player of the Year: Dee Brown, Illinois

=== Major freshman of the year awards ===
- USBWA Freshman of the Year: Marvin Williams, North Carolina
- Sporting News Freshman of the Year: Marvin Williams, North Carolina

=== Major coach of the year awards ===
- Associated Press Coach of the Year: Bruce Weber, Illinois
- Henry Iba Award (USBWA): Bruce Weber, Illinois
- NABC Coach of the Year: Bruce Weber, Illinois
- Naismith College Coach of the Year: Bruce Weber, Illinois
- CBS/Chevrolet Coach of the Year: Bruce Weber, Illinois
- Adolph Rupp Cup: Bruce Weber, Illinois
- Sporting News Coach of the Year: Bruce Weber, Illinois

=== Other major awards ===
- Bob Cousy Award (Best point guard): Raymond Felton, North Carolina
- Pete Newell Big Man Award (Best big man): Andrew Bogut, Utah
- NABC Defensive Player of the Year: Shelden Williams, Duke
- Frances Pomeroy Naismith Award (Best player under 6'0): Nate Robinson, Washington
- Lowe's Senior CLASS Award (top senior): Wayne Simien, Kansas
- Robert V. Geasey Trophy (Top player in Philadelphia Big 5): Pat Carroll, St. Joseph's
- NIT/Haggerty Award (Top player in New York City metro area): Keydren Clark, Saint Peter's
- Chip Hilton Player of the Year Award (Strong personal character): Ronald Ross, Texas Tech

== Coaching changes ==
A number of teams changed coaches throughout the season and after the season ended.

Team	Former Coach	Interim Coach	New Coach	Reason
Air Force	Chris Mooney		Jeff Bzdelik	Mooney left for Richmond after only one year.
Alabama State	Rob Spivery		Lewis Jackson	Spivery jumped jobs within the SWAC.
BYU	Steve Cleveland		Dave Rose	Cleveland left to take the coaching position at Fresno State, Associate head coach Rose was elevated to the top spot.
Centenary	Kevin Johnson		Rob Flaska	
Charleston Southern	Jim Platt		Barclay Radebaugh	
Cincinnati	Bob Huggins	Andy Kennedy	Mick Cronin	Huggins resigned after a power struggle with Cincinnati's Athletic Director. Assistant Kennedy coached the season but was replaced by Cronin after the 2005–06 season's end.
Coastal Carolina	Pete Strickland		Buzz Peterson	Coastal scored a high-profile hire, bringing in fired Tennessee coach Peterson.
DePaul	Dave Leitao		Jerry Wainwright	Leitao left for Virginia, paving the way for Chicago native Wainwright to return home.
East Carolina	Bill Herrion		Ricky Stokes	ECU Athletic Director Terry Holland hired his former player to lead the Pirates.
Eastern Illinois	Rick Samuels		Mike Miller	
Eastern Kentucky	Travis Ford		Jeff Neubauer	EKU hires West Virginia's top assistant after Ford leaves for UMass.
Eastern Michigan	Jim Boone		Charles Ramsey	
Florida Atlantic	Sidney Green		Matt Doherty	FAU fires Green and hires deposed North Carolina coach Doherty.
Fresno State	Ray Lopes		Steve Cleveland	
IPFW	Doug Noll	Joe Pechota	Dane Fife	IPFW makes the 25-year-old Fife the youngest head coach in Division I.
Jacksonville	Hugh Durham		Cliff Warren	Durham retired after 37 seasons and 633 victories.
Louisiana-Monroe	Mike Vining		Orlando Early	
Loyola Marymount	Steve Aggers		Rodney Tention	
Massachusetts	Steve Lappas		Travis Ford	Lappas was fired after UMass missed the postseason in all four of his seasons there.
Mississippi Valley State	Lafayette Stribling		James Green	
New Hampshire	Phil Rowe		Bill Herrion	
New Mexico State	Lou Henson	Tony Stubblefield	Reggie Theus	Henson officially retired on January 22, 2005 for health reasons. After the season, Louisville assistant and former NBA All-Star Theus was hired.
Portland State	Heath Schroyer		Ken Bone	
Purdue	Gene Keady		Matt Painter	Purdue executed their succession plan as Keady stepped aside for top assistant (and former Purdue player) Painter.
Richmond	Jerry Wainwright		Chris Mooney	Richmond turned to Princeton offense disciple Mooney after Wainwright left for DePaul
Rider	Don Harnum		Tommy Dempsey	Dempsey took over as Harnum became Rider AD.
San Jose State	Phil L. Johnson		George Nessman	
Savannah State	Ed Daniels		Horace Broadnax	
Siena	Rob Lanier		Fran McCaffery	
Southeastern Louisiana	Billy Kennedy		Jim Yarbrough	
Southern California	Henry Bibby	Jim Saia	Tim Floyd	Bibby was fired four games into the season. Coaching veteran Floyd was hired after the season.
Stony Brook	Nick Macarchuk		Steve Pikiell	
St. Francis (NY)	Ron Ganulin		Brian Nash	
Tennessee	Buzz Peterson		Bruce Pearl	Pearl parlayed Wisconsin-Milwaukee's Sweet 16 run into a Southeastern Conference head coaching job.
Tulane	Shawn Finney		Dave Dickerson	Tulane hired top Maryland assistant Dickerson.
Tulsa	John Phillips		Doug Wojcik	Tulsa tapped Tom Izzo assistant Wojcik.
UC Riverside	John Masi		David Spencer	
UNC Greensboro	Fran McCaffery		Mike Dement	
Vermont	Tom Brennan		Mike Lonergan	Colorful coach Brennan retired after 19 years.
Virginia	Pete Gillen		Dave Leitao	Gillen steps down after seven years (but only one NCAA bid) at the helm.
VMI	Bart Bellairs		Duggar Baucom	
Western Carolina	Steve Shurina		Larry Hunter	
Wisconsin-Milwaukee	Bruce Pearl		Rob Jeter	UWM brought back former Panther assistant Jeter after Pearl left for Tennessee.
Youngstown State	John Robic		Jerry Slocum	
