= 2004–05 Texas Longhorns men's basketball team =

American college basketball season

2004–05 Texas Longhorns men's basketball

NCAA Tournament, Round of 64
- Conference: Big 12
- South
- Record: 20–11 (9–7 Big 12)
- Head coach: Rick Barnes
- Home arena: Frank Erwin Center

2004–05 Big 12 men's basketball standings
	Conf.				Overall
Team	W		L	PCT	W		L	PCT
No. 17 Oklahoma	12	–	4	.750	25	–	8	.758
No. 12 Kansas	12	–	4	.750	23	–	7	.767
No. 6 Oklahoma State †	11	–	5	.688	26	–	7	.788
No. 24 Texas Tech	10	–	6	.625	22	–	11	.667
Iowa State	9	–	7	.563	19	–	12	.613
Texas	9	–	7	.563	20	–	11	.645
Texas A&M	8	–	8	.500	21	–	10	.677
Missouri	7	–	9	.438	16	–	17	.485
Nebraska	7	–	9	.438	14	–	14	.500
Kansas State	6	–	10	.375	17	–	12	.586
Colorado	4	–	12	.250	14	–	16	.467
Baylor	1	–	15	.063	9	–	19	.321
† 2005 Big 12 Tournament winner Rankings from AP poll

The 2004–05 Texas Longhorns men's basketball team represented The University of Texas at Austin in the 2004–05 NCAA Division I men's basketball season as a member of the Big 12 Conference. They were coached by Rick Barnes in his seventh season as head coach and played their home games at the Frank Erwin Center. The Longhorns finished the season with are record of 20–11, 9–7 in Big 12 play in a tie for fifth place. They lost to Colorado in the first round of the Big 12 Tournament. They received an at-large bid to the NCAA Tournament as a No. 8 seed where they lost to Nevada in the first round.

== Previous season ==
The Longhorns finished the 2003–04 season with an overall record of 25–8, 12–4 in Big East play to finish in a tie for second place in conference. They lost to Oklahoma State in the finals of the Big 12 Tournament. They received an at-large bid as a No. 3 seed to the NCAA Tournament. In the Tournament, they defeated Princeton and North Carolina to advance to the Sweet Sixteen. there they lost to Xavier.

== Roster ==
	#	Position	Height	Weight	Year	Home Town
LaMarcus Aldridge	23	Forward	6–11	240	Freshman	Seagoville, Texas
Bradley Buckman	22	Forward	6-8	235	Junior	Austin, Texas
Dion Dowell	1	Forward	6–7	205	Freshman	Texas City, Texas
Daniel Gibson	1	Guard	6–2	190	Freshman	Houston, Texas
Adam Gracely	5	Guard	5-9	150	Freshman	Houston, Texas
Sydmill Harris	13	Guard	6–5	200	Senior	Hoofddorp, Netherlands
Jason Klotz	21	Center	6–9	245	Senior	Klein, Texas
Kenton Paulino	12	Guard	6–1	185	Junior	Los Angeles, California
Chris Price	31	Forward	6–11	240	Freshman	Houston, Texas
Kenny Taylor	10	Guard	6–6	230	Senior	Sugar Land, Texas
P. J. Tucker	2	Forward	6–5	225	Sophomore	Raleigh, North Carolina
Mike Williams	21	Forward	6–7	240	Freshman	Camden, Alabama

== Schedule and results ==
Date time, TV	Rank^{#}	Opponent^{#}	Result	Record	Site (attendance) city, state
Exhibition
Nov 9, 2004*; 7:00 pm	No. 16	Lenoir-Rhyne	W 92–47		Frank Erwin Center; Austin, TX
Nov 15, 2004*; 7:00 pm	No. 16	Tarleton State	W 86–53		Frank Erwin Center; Austin, TX
Non-conference regular season
Nov 19, 2004*; 7:00 pm	No. 16	Texas State	W 95–63	1–0	Frank Erwin Center (10,221); Austin, TX
Nov 22, 2004*; 1:30 pm, ESPN2	No. 15	vs. Chaminade; Maui Invitational	W 84–62	2–0	Lahaina Civic Center; Lahaina, HI
Nov 23, 2004*; 6:00 pm, ESPN	No. 15	vs. Iowa; Maui Invitational	L 80–82	2–1	Lahaina Civic Center; Lahaina, HI
Nov 24, 2004*; 3:30 pm, ESPN2	No. 15	vs. Tennessee; Maui Invitational	W 90–75	3–1	Lahaina Civic Center; Lahaina, HI
Nov 29, 2004*; 7:00 pm, FSNW	No. 18	Coppin State	W 91–60	4–1	Frank Erwin Center (6,093); Austin, TX
Dec 4, 2004*; 1:00 pm	No. 18	at Seton Hall	W 70–62	5–1	Continental Airlines Arena; East Rutherford, NJ
Dec 7, 2004*; 7:00 pm, FSNW	No. 18	North Texas	W 86–57	6–1	Frank Erwin Center (6,482); Austin, TX
Dec 15, 2004*; 7:00 pm, FSNW	No. 14	Texas-Arlington	W 85–70	7–1	Frank Erwin Center (6,617); Austin, TX
Dec 18, 2004*; 1:00 pm, ESPN	No. 14	Wake Forest	L 88–89	7–2	Lawrence Joel Coliseum; Winston-Salem, NC
Dec 22, 2004*; 7:00 pm, FSNW	No. 15	Centenary	W 97–52	8–2	Frank Erwin Center (7,052); Austin, TX
Dec 29, 2004*; 7:00 pm, FSNW	No. 15	Texas-San Antonio	W 100–82	9–2	Frank Erwin Center (8,057); Austin, TX
Jan 2, 2005*; 7:00 pm	No. 15	UNLV	W 89–82	10–2	Frank Erwin Center (8,138); Austin, TX
Jan 6, 2005*; 8:00 pm, ESPN2	No. 15	Memphis	W 74–67	11–2	Frank Erwin Center (12,022); Austin, TX
Big 12 regular season
Jan 9, 2005; 2:00 pm, FSNW	No. 15	Baylor	W 79–60	12–2 (1–0)	Frank Erwin Center (11,463); Austin, TX
Jan 12, 2005; 7:00 pm, FSNW	No. 10	at Texas A&M	L 63–74	12–3 (1–1)	Reed Arena; College Station, TX
Jan 15, 2005; 12:30 pm, ESPN Plus	No. 10	at Nebraska	W 63–53	13–3 (2–1)	Devaney Center; Lincoln, NE
Jan 17, 2005; 8:00 pm, ESPN	No. 15	No. 5 Oklahoma State	W 75–61	14–3 (3–1)	Frank Erwin Center (16,755); Austin, TX
Jan 22, 2005; 2:45 pm, CBS	No. 11	at No. 18 Oklahoma	L 60–64	14–4 (3–2)	Lloyd Noble Center; Norman, OK
Jan 25, 2005; 8:00 pm, ESPN Plus	No. 16	Texas Tech	W 80–73	15–4 (4–2)	Frank Erwin Center (16,080); Austin, TX
Jan 29, 2005; 8:00 pm, ESPN2	No. 16	at No. 6 Kansas; College GameDay	L 65–90	15–5 (4–3)	Allen Fieldhouse; Lawrence, KS
Feb 5, 2005; 3:00 pm, ESPN Plus	No. 20	Iowa State	L 80–92 ^{OT}	15–6 (4–4)	Frank Erwin Center (13,066); Austin, TX
Feb 8, 2005; 8:30 pm, FSNSW	No. 23	at Colorado	L 79–88	15–7 (4–5)	Coors Events Center; Boulder, CO
Feb 12, 2005; 12:45 pm, ESPN Plus	No. 23	Kansas State	W 75–72 ^{OT}	16–7 (5–5)	Frank Erwin Center (13,355); Austin, TX
Feb 16, 2005; 7:00 pm, FSNSW		Texas A&M	W 75–40	17–7 (6–5)	Frank Erwin Center (14,018); Austin, TX
Feb 19, 2005; 8:00 pm, ESPN Plus		Baylor	W 75–60	18–7 (7–5)	Ferrell Center; Waco, TX
Feb 22, 2005; 7:00 pm, ESPN2		at Texas Tech	L 65–69	18–8 (7–6)	United Spirit Arena; Lubbock, TX
Feb 26, 2005; 12:00 pm, ABC		Missouri	W 63–51	19–8 (8–6)	Frank Erwin Center (13,756); Austin, TX
Feb 28, 2005; 8:00 pm, ESPN		No. 20 Oklahoma	L 58–74	19–9 (9–7)	Frank Erwin Center (15,036); Austin, TX
Mar 5, 2005; 8:00 pm, ESPN		at No. 8 Oklahoma State; College GameDay	W 74–73	20–9 (9–7)	Gallagher Iba Arena; Stillwater, OK
Big 12 tournament
Mar 10, 2005; 8:20 pm, ESPNU	(6)	vs. (11) Colorado first round	L 69–81	20–10	Kemper Arena; Kansas City, MO
NCAA tournament
Mar 10, 2005; 6:10 pm, CBS	(8 Chicago)	vs. (9 Chicago) Nevada; First Round	L 57–61	20–11	RCA Dome; Indianapolis, IN
*Non-conference game. ^{#}Rankings from AP Poll. (#) Tournament seedings in parentheses. All times are in Central Time.
