= 2004–05 Kansas Jayhawks men's basketball team =

American college basketball season

2004–05 Kansas Jayhawks men's basketball

Big 12 regular season co-champions

NCAA Tournament, Round of 64
- Conference: Big 12 Conference

Ranking
- Coaches: No. 15
- AP: No. 12
- Record: 23–7 (12–4 Big 12)
- Head coach: Bill Self (2nd season)
- Assistant coaches: Joe Dooley (2nd season); Tim Jankovich (2nd season); Kurtis Townsend (1st season)
- Captains: Keith Langford; Michael Lee; Aaron Miles; Wayne Simien
- Home arena: Allen Fieldhouse

2004–05 Big 12 men's basketball standings
| | Conf. | | | | Overall |
| Team | W | | L | PCT | W | | L | PCT |
|---|---|---|---|---|---|---|---|---|
| No. 17 Oklahoma | 12 | – | 4 | .750 | 25 | – | 8 | .758 |
| No. 12 Kansas | 12 | – | 4 | .750 | 23 | – | 7 | .767 |
| No. 6 Oklahoma State † | 11 | – | 5 | .688 | 26 | – | 7 | .788 |
| No. 24 Texas Tech | 10 | – | 6 | .625 | 22 | – | 11 | .667 |
| Iowa State | 9 | – | 7 | .563 | 19 | – | 12 | .613 |
| Texas | 9 | – | 7 | .563 | 20 | – | 11 | .645 |
| Texas A&M | 8 | – | 8 | .500 | 21 | – | 10 | .677 |
| Missouri | 7 | – | 9 | .438 | 16 | – | 17 | .485 |
| Nebraska | 7 | – | 9 | .438 | 14 | – | 14 | .500 |
| Kansas State | 6 | – | 10 | .375 | 17 | – | 12 | .586 |
| Colorado | 4 | – | 12 | .250 | 14 | – | 16 | .467 |
| Baylor | 1 | – | 15 | .063 | 9 | – | 19 | .321 |
† 2005 Big 12 Tournament winner Rankings from AP poll

The 2004–05 Kansas Jayhawks men's basketball team represented the University of Kansas Jayhawks for the NCAA Division I men's 2004–05 NCAA Division I men's basketball season. The team was led by Bill Self in his second season as head coach. The team played its home games at Allen Fieldhouse in Lawrence, Kansas. The Jayhawks finished the season with a record of 23–7, 12–4 in Big 12 play to finish in a tie for first place in conference. The season marked the first of an NCAA record-setting 14 consecutive conference championships for Kansas. They lost to Oklahoma State in the semifinals of the Big 12 tournament. They received an at-large bid to the NCAA tournament as a No. 3 seed in the Syracuse Region. The Jayhawks were upset in the first round by Bucknell on a last second shot.

== Recruiting class ==
College recruiting information
| Name | Hometown | School | Height | Weight | Commit date |
|---|---|---|---|---|---|
| Alex Galindo; SF | Newark, NJ | St. Benedict's Prep | 6 ft 7 in (2.01 m) | 205 lb (93 kg) | May 17, 2004 |
| Alex Galindo; SF | Recruit ratings: Scout: Rivals: (N/A) | | | | |
| C.J. Giles; C | Seattle, WA | Rainier Beach HS | 6 ft 10 in (2.08 m) | 240 lb (110 kg) | May 19, 2004 |
| C.J. Giles; C | Recruit ratings: Scout: Rivals: (N/A) | | | | |
| Darnell Jackson; PF | Oklahoma City, OK | Midwest City HS | 6 ft 8 in (2.03 m) | 205 lb (93 kg) | Jul 17, 2003 |
| Darnell Jackson; PF | Recruit ratings: Scout: Rivals: (N/A) | | | | |
| Sasha Kaun; C | Tumsk, Russia | Florida Air Academy | 6 ft 11 in (2.11 m) | 250 lb (110 kg) | Oct 6, 2003 |
| Sasha Kaun; C | Recruit ratings: Scout: Rivals: (N/A) | | | | |
| Russell Robinson; SG | New York, NY | Rice HS | 6 ft 1 in (1.85 m) | 205 lb (93 kg) | Sep 29, 2003 |
| Russell Robinson; SG | Recruit ratings: Scout: Rivals: (N/A) | | | | |
Overall recruit ranking: Scout: 5 Rivals: 2 ESPN: N/A
Note: In many cases, Scout, Rivals, 247Sports, On3, and ESPN may conflict in their listings of height and weight.; In these cases, the average was taken. ESPN grades are on a 100-point scale.; Sources: "Kansas 2004 Basketball Commitments". Rivals.; "2004 Kansas Basketball Commits". Scout.; "ESPN". ESPN.; "Scout.com Team Recruiting Rankings". Scout.; "2004 Team Ranking". Rivals.

== Roster ==
| Name | # | Position | Height | Weight | Year | Home town |
|---|---|---|---|---|---|---|
| Nick Bahe | 21 | Guard | 6–2 | 185 | Sophomore | Lincoln, NE |
| Jeremy Case | 10 | Guard | 6–0 | 165 | Sophomore | McAlester, OK |
| Alex Galindo | 2 | Forward | 6–7 | 205 | Freshman | Newark, NJ |
| J.R. Giddens | 15 | Guard | 6–5 | 200 | Sophomore | Oklahoma City, OK |
| C.J. Giles | 33 | Center | 6–10 | 220 | Freshman | Seattle, WA |
| Jeff Hawkins | 1 | Guard | 5–11 | 180 | Junior | Kansas City, KS |
| Darnell Jackson | 32 | Forward | 6–8 | 240 | Freshman | Oklahoma City, OK |
| Sasha Kaun | 24 | Center | 6–11 | 235 | Freshman | Tomsk, Russia |
| Matt Kleinmann | 44 | Center | 6–10 | 230 | Freshman | Overland Park, KS |
| Keith Langford | 5 | Guard | 6–4 | 215 | Senior | Fort Worth, TX |
| Michael Lee | 25 | Guard | 6–3 | 215 | Senior | Portland, OR |
| Aaron Miles | 11 | Guard | 6–1 | 175 | Senior | Portland, OR |
| Christian Moody | 34 | Forward | 6–8 | 220 | Junior | Asheville, NC |
| Moulaye Niang | 55 | Forward | 6–10 | 220 | Junior | El Cajon, CA |
| Russell Robinson | 3 | Guard | 6–1 | 185 | Freshman | New York City, NY |
| Wayne Simien | 23 | Forward | 6–9 | 255 | Senior | Leavenworth, KS |
| Stephen Vinson | 20 | Guard | 6–2 | 190 | Junior | Lawrence, KS |

== Schedule ==
| Date time, TV | Rank^{#} | Opponent^{#} | Result | Record | Site (attendance) city, state |
Summer Canadian exhibition
| 09/04/04*; 2:00 pm | | British Columbia | W 82–51 | | UBC War Memorial Gymnasium (2,200); Vancouver, B.C. |
| 09/05/04*; 1:00 pm | | Langara College | W 101–46 | | UBC War Memorial Gymnasium (550); Vancouver, B.C. |
| 09/05/04*; 9:00 pm | | University College of Fraser Valley | W 106–71 | | Mennonite Education Institute Secondary Gym (1,400); Abbotsford, B.C. |
| 09/06/04*; 1:00 pm | | Burnaby Mountain All-Stars | W 98–76 | | Chancellor's Gymnasium (2,300); Burnaby, B.C. |
Exhibition
| 11/07/04*; 7:00 pm, J-TV | No. 1 | Emporia State | W 115–70 | | Allen Fieldhouse (16,300); Lawrence, KS |
| 11/14/04*; 7:00 pm, J-TV | No. 1 | Washburn | W 79–70 | | Allen Fieldhouse (16,300); Lawrence, KS |
Regular season
| 11/19/04*; 7:00 pm, J-TV | No. 1 | Vermont | W 68–61 | 1–0 | Allen Fieldhouse (16,300); Lawrence, KS |
| 11/23/04*; 9:00 pm, ESPN2 | No. 2 | Saint Joseph's | W 91–51 | 2–0 | Allen Fieldhouse (16,300); Lawrence, KS |
| 11/29/04*; 8:00 pm, ESPN2 | No. 2 | Nevada | W 85–52 | 3–0 | Allen Fieldhouse (16,300); Lawrence, KS |
| 12/04/04*; 2:00 pm, J-TV | No. 2 | Pacific | W 81–70 | 4–0 | Allen Fieldhouse (16,300); Lawrence, KS |
| 12/09/04*; 8:00 pm, ESPN | No. 2 | TCU | W 93-74 | 5–0 | Allen Fieldhouse (16,300); Lawrence, KS |
| 12/11/04*; 7:00 pm, J-TV | No. 2 | Louisiana-Lafayette | W 96–51 | 6–0 | Allen Fieldhouse (16,300); Lawrence, KS |
| 12/18/04*; 7:00 pm, J-TV | No. 2 | South Carolina | W 64–60 | 7–0 | Allen Fieldhouse (16,300); Lawrence, KS |
| 12/22/04*; 7:00 pm, J-TV | No. 2 | UW-Milwaukee; Yellow Book Shootout | W 73–62 | 8–0 | Kemper Arena (17,843); Kansas City, MO |
| 01/01/05*; 1:30 pm, ESPN | No. 2 | No. 9 Georgia Tech | W 70–68 ^{OT} | 9–0 | Allen Fieldhouse (16,300); Lawrence, KS |
| 01/05/05; 8:00 pm, ESPN+ | No. 2 | Texas A&M | W 65–60 | 10–0 (1–0) | Allen Fieldhouse (16,300); Lawrence, KS |
| 01/09/05*; 3:30 pm, CBS | No. 2 | at No. 8 Kentucky | W 65–59 | 11–0 | Rupp Arena (24,367); Lexington, KY |
| 01/12/05; 7:00 pm, J-TV | No. 2 | at Iowa State | W 71–66 | 12–0 (2–0) | Hilton Coliseum (13,009); Ames, IA |
| 01/15/05; 3:00 pm, ESPN+ | No. 2 | at Colorado | W 76–61 | 13–0 (3–0) | Coors Events Center (11,057); Boulder, CO |
| 01/19/05; 7:00 pm, J-TV | No. 2 | Nebraska | W 59–57 | 14–0 (4–0) | Allen Fieldhouse (16,300); Lawrence, KS |
| 01/22/05*; 12:00 pm, ESPN | No. 2 | at Villanova | L 62–83 | 14–1 | Wachovia Center (13,684); Philadelphia, PA |
| 01/25/05; 6:30 pm, J-TV | No. 6 | at Baylor | W 86–66 | 15–1 (5–0) | Ferrell Center (7,280); Waco, TX |
| 01/29/05; 8:00 pm, ESPN2 | No. 6 | No. 16 Texas; College GameDay | W 90–65 | 16–1 (6–0) | Allen Fieldhouse (16,300); Lawrence, KS |
| 01/31/05; 6:00 pm, ESPN | No. 6 | Missouri | W 73–61 | 17–1 (7–0) | Allen Fieldhouse (16,300); Lawrence, KS |
| 02/05/05; 11:00 am, ESPN | No. 3 | at Nebraska | W 78–65 | 18–1 (8–0) | Bob Devaney Sports Center (13,821); Lincoln, NE |
| 02/09/05; 8:00 pm, ESPN+ | No. 3 | at Kansas State | W 74–65 | 19–1 (9–0) | Bramlage Coliseum (13,340); Manhattan, KS |
| 02/12/05; 2:30 pm, ABC | No. 3 | Colorado | W 89–60 | 20–1 (10–0) | Allen Fieldhouse (16,300); Lawrence, KS |
| 02/14/05; 8:00 pm, ESPN | No. 3 | at No. 25 Texas Tech | L 79–80 ^{2OT} | 20–2 (10–1) | United Spirit Arena (12,298); Lubbock, TX |
| 02/19/05; 12:00 pm, ABC | No. 2 | Iowa State | L 61–63 ^{OT} | 20–3 (10–2) | Allen Fieldhouse (16,300); Lawrence, KS |
| 02/21/05; 8:00 pm, ESPN | No. 2 | at No. 21 Oklahoma | L 63–71 | 20–4 (10–3) | Lloyd Noble Center (12,403); Norman, OK |
| 02/28/05; 3:00 pm, CBS | No. 8 | No. 4 Oklahoma State | W 81–79 | 21–4 (11–3) | Allen Fieldhouse (16,300); Lawrence, KS |
| 03/02/05; 8:00 pm, ESPN2 | No. 7 | Kansas State | W 72–65 | 22–4 (12–3) | Allen Fieldhouse (16,300); Lawrence, KS |
| 03/06/05; 1:00 pm, CBS | No. 7 | at Missouri | L 68–72 | 22–5 (12–4) | Mizzou Arena (15,061); Columbia, MO |
Big 12 Tournament
| 03/11/05; 6:00 pm, ESPN | (2) No. 9 | vs. (10) Kansas State quarterfinals | W 80–67 | 23–5 | Kemper Arena (18,268); Kansas City, MO |
| 03/12/05; 3:30 pm, ESPN | (2) No. 9 | vs. (3) No. 10 Oklahoma State semifinals | L 75–78 | 23–6 | Kemper Arena (18,268); Kansas City, MO |
NCAA tournament
| 03/18/05; 8:30 pm, CBS | (3 S) No. 12 | vs. (14 S) Bucknell; First round | L 63–64 | 23–7 | Ford Center (18,567); Oklahoma City, OK |
*Non-conference game. ^{#}Rankings from AP Poll. (#) Tournament seedings in parentheses. S=Syracuse Regional. All times are in Central Standard Time.

== Awards ==
2004–05 Phillips 66 Big 12 Player of the Year
Wayne Simien (Senior, Forward)
Bayer Advantage Senior CLASS Award
Wayne Simien (Senior, Forward)
All-Big 12 Second Team
Keith Langford (Senior, Guard)
All-Big 12 Third Team
Aaron Miles (Senior, Guard)
Phillips 66 Big 12 Player of the Week
Wayne Simien (Senior, Forward), November 22 and January 17
Keith Langford (Senior, Guard), January 3 (co-winner)
CBS Player of the Game vs Kentucky
Christian Moody (Junior, Forward), January 9
Academic All-Big 12
Michael Lee (Senior, Guard)
Christian Moody (Junior, Forward)
