= 2004–05 Oklahoma Sooners men's basketball team =

American college basketball season

2004–05 Oklahoma Sooners men's basketball

Big 12 Regular season co-champions

NCAA tournament, second round
- Conference: Big 12 Conference

Ranking
- Coaches: No. 20
- AP: No. 17
- Record: 25–8 (12–4 Big 12)
- Head coach: Kelvin Sampson (11th season)
- Assistant coaches: Ray Lopes; Bennie Seltzer; Jim Shaw
- Home arena: Lloyd Noble Center (Capacity: 12,000)

2004–05 Big 12 men's basketball standings
	Conf.				Overall
Team	W		L	PCT	W		L	PCT
No. 17 Oklahoma	12	–	4	.750	25	–	8	.758
No. 12 Kansas	12	–	4	.750	23	–	7	.767
No. 6 Oklahoma State †	11	–	5	.688	26	–	7	.788
No. 24 Texas Tech	10	–	6	.625	22	–	11	.667
Iowa State	9	–	7	.563	19	–	12	.613
Texas	9	–	7	.563	20	–	11	.645
Texas A&M	8	–	8	.500	21	–	10	.677
Missouri	7	–	9	.438	16	–	17	.485
Nebraska	7	–	9	.438	14	–	14	.500
Kansas State	6	–	10	.375	17	–	12	.586
Colorado	4	–	12	.250	14	–	16	.467
Baylor	1	–	15	.063	9	–	19	.321
† 2005 Big 12 Tournament winner Rankings from AP poll

The 2004–05 Oklahoma Sooners men's basketball team represented the University of Oklahoma as a member of the Big 12 Conference during the 2004–05 NCAA Division I men's basketball season. The team was led by head coach Kelvin Sampson and played its home games in the Lloyd Noble Center. Oklahoma finished tied atop the Big 12 regular season standings with Kansas, and OU won the only regular season meeting between the teams. The Sooners fell in the semifinal round of the Big 12 Conference tournament, but received an at-large bid to the NCAA tournament No. 3 seed in the South region. After beating No. 14 seed Niagara in the opening round, the Sooners fell to No. 6 seed Utah in the round of 32 to finish the season 25–8 (12–4 Big 12).

== Roster ==
2004–05 Oklahoma Sooners men's basketball team
Players
Coaches

Pos.	#	Name	Height	Weight	Year	Hometown
F	21	Taj Gray	6 ft 9 in (2.06 m)	238 lb (108 kg)	Jr	Wichita, Kansas
F	34	Kevin Bookout	6 ft 8 in (2.03 m)	270 lb (122 kg)	Jr	Stroud, Oklahoma
G	24	Drew Lavender	5 ft 7 in (1.7 m)	153 lb (69 kg)	So	Columbus, Ohio

Head coach

- Kelvin Sampson (UNC Pembroke)

Assistant coach(es)

Legend

- (C) Team captain
- (S) Suspended
- (I) Ineligible
- (W) Walk-on
- Injured
- Current redshirt

== Schedule and results ==
Date time, TV	Rank^{#}	Opponent^{#}	Result	Record	Site (attendance) city, state
Regular season
Nov 20, 2004*		Cal State Northridge	W 82–72	1–0	Lloyd Noble Center; Norman, Oklahoma
Nov 25, 2004*		vs. High Point; Great Alaska Shootout	W 93–65	2–0	Sullivan Arena; Anchorage, Alaska
Nov 26, 2004*		vs. No. 22 Washington; Great Alaska Shootout	L 91–96	2–1	Sullivan Arena; Anchorage, Alaska
Nov 27, 2004*		vs. Minnesota; Great Alaska Shootout	W 67–54	3–1	Sullivan Arena; Anchorage, Alaska
Dec 1, 2004*		Coppin State	W 67–44	4–1	Lloyd Noble Center; Norman, Oklahoma
Dec 8, 2004*		at Purdue	W 66–48	5–1	Mackey Arena; West Lafayette, Indiana
Dec 11, 2004*		Northern Colorado	W 80–44	6–1	Lloyd Noble Center; Norman, Oklahoma
Dec 18, 2004*		vs. No. 7 Duke; Dreyfus Classic	L 67–78	6–2	Madison Square Garden; New York, New York
Dec 23, 2004*		Missouri State	W 61–53	7–2	Lloyd Noble Center; Norman, Oklahoma
Dec 28, 2004*		vs. Tulsa; All-College Basketball Classic	W 70–64	8–2	Ford Center; Oklahoma City, Oklahoma
Dec 30, 2004*		Florida A&M	W 104–45	9–2	Lloyd Noble Center; Norman, Oklahoma
Jan 2, 2005*		Texas-Rio Grande Valley	W 94–54	10–2	Lloyd Noble Center; Norman, Oklahoma
Jan 8, 2005		Colorado	W 85–55	11–2 (1–0)	Lloyd Noble Center; Norman, Oklahoma
Jan 10, 2005*	No. 25	No. 12 Connecticut	W 77–65	12–2	Lloyd Noble Center; Norman, Oklahoma
Jan 15, 2005	No. 25	at Baylor	W 65–61	13–2 (2–0)	Ferrell Center; Waco, Texas
Jan 18, 2005	No. 18	at Texas A&M	W 70-54	14–2 (3–0)	Reed Arena; College Station, Texas
Jan 22, 2005	No. 18	No. 15 Texas	W 64-60	15–2 (4–0)	Lloyd Noble Center; Norman, Oklahoma
Jan 24, 2005	No. 13	No. 9 Oklahoma State	W 67-57	16–2 (5–0)	Lloyd Noble Center; Norman, Oklahoma
Jan 29, 2005	No. 13	at Iowa State	L 66-74	16–3 (5–1)	Hilton Coliseum; Ames, Iowa
Feb 2, 2005	No. 15	Texas A&M	W 69-65	17–3 (6–1)	Lloyd Noble Center; Norman, Oklahoma
Feb 5, 2005	No. 15	Texas Tech	L 81-88	17–4 (6–2)	Lloyd Noble Center; Norman, Oklahoma
Feb 7, 2005	No. 16	No. 10 Oklahoma State	L 67-79	17–5 (6–3)	Gallagher-Iba Arena; Stillwater, Oklahoma
Mar 5, 2005	No. 20	at Texas Tech	W 74–54	23–6 (12–4)	United Spirit Arena; Lubbock, Texas
Big 12 tournament
Mar 11, 2005*	(1) No. 17	vs. Missouri; Quarterfinals	W 83–79	24–6	Kemper Arena; Kansas City, Missouri
Mar 12, 2005*	(1) No. 17	vs. Texas Tech; Semifinals	L 63–69	24–7	Kemper Arena; Kansas City, Missouri
NCAA tournament
Mar 17, 2005*	(3 S) No. 17	vs. (14 S) Niagara; First Round	W 84–67	25–7	McKale Center; Tucson, Arizona
Mar 19, 2005*	(3 S) No. 17	vs. (6 S) No. 18 Utah; Second Round	L 58–67	25–8	McKale Center; Tucson, Arizona
*Non-conference game. ^{#}Rankings from AP poll. (#) Tournament seedings in parentheses. All times are in Central Time. (#) during NCAA Tournament is seed within region S=South.
