= Wayne Simien =

American basketball player (born 1983)

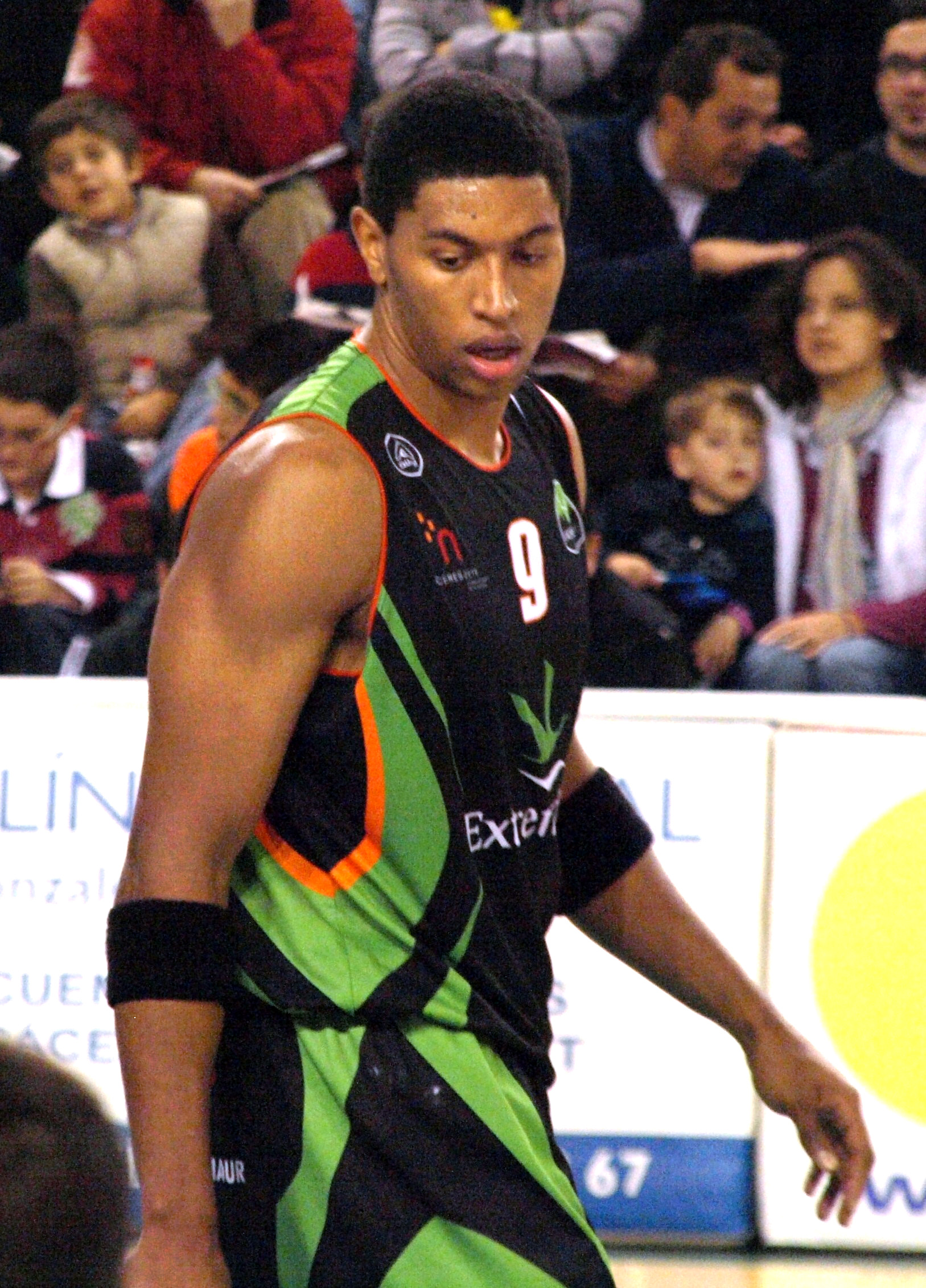
- Simien in 2009

Personal information
- Born: March 9, 1983 (age 43) Leavenworth, Kansas, U.S.
- Listed height: 6 ft 9 in (2.06 m)
- Listed weight: 260 lb (118 kg)

Career information
- High school: Leavenworth (Leavenworth, Kansas)
- College: Kansas (2001–2005)
- NBA draft: 2005: 1st round, 29th overall pick
- Drafted by: Miami Heat
- Playing career: 2005–2009
- Position: Power forward
- Number: 25

Career history
- 2005–2007: Miami Heat
- 2008–2009: Cáceres Ciudad del Baloncesto

Career highlights
- NBA champion (2006); Consensus first-team All-American (2005); Third-team All-American – AP (2004); Big 12 Player of the Year (2005); No. 23 jersey retired by Kansas Jayhawks; McDonald's All-American (2001); Second-team Parade All-American (2001); Mr. Kansas Basketball (2001)

Career NBA statistics
- Points: 169
- Rebound: 99
- Assists/Steals: 11/15
- Stats at NBA.com
- Stats at Basketball Reference

Wayne Anthony Simien Jr. (born March 9, 1983) is an American former professional basketball player. He was a member of the Miami Heat when they won the 2006 NBA championship. Simien played in college at the University of Kansas, where he was a consensus first-team All-American his senior year in 2005.

== High school career ==
Growing up, Simien was a University of Kansas fan due to his proximity to Lawrence. He committed to play for Roy Williams and the University of Kansas as early as the 8th or 9th grade, and was later named to the 2001 McDonald's All-American Team. He played for the Leavenworth Pioneers in high school with Coach Larry Hogan and led the Pioneers to a 6A-State Championship his junior year in high school. During his high school career, he began working with world-renowned conditioning coach Istvan Javorek.

== College career ==
At Kansas, Simien received All-American honors his junior and senior years. He was a Wooden Award finalist both years, and was the Big 12 Player of the Year his senior year. His college career ended when Kansas was defeated by 14th-seeded Bucknell in the first round of the 2005 NCAA tournament. While at Kansas he won three Big 12 Championships and earned four NCAA Tournament berths including two Final Four appearances (one national runner-up finish) and one Elite 8 finish. Simien finished his college career with 110 wins and a 12–4 NCAA Tournament record. Simien was the Lowe's Senior CLASS Award winner his final year, recognizing him as the nation's top senior men's basketball player. He finished his career as the 12th leading all-time scorer at Kansas with 1,593 points. Kansas retired his number 23 jersey on January 29, 2011.

=== College statistics ===
| Year | Team | GP | GS | MPG | FG% | 3P% | FT% | RPG | APG | SPG | BPG | PPG |
|---|---|---|---|---|---|---|---|---|---|---|---|---|
| 2001–02 | Kansas | 32 | - | 15.3 | .553 | - | .738 | 5.3 | .3 | .6 | .8 | 8.1 |
| 2002–03 | Kansas | 16 | - | 24.4 | .646 | - | .676 | 8.2 | .6 | .9 | .3 | 14.8 |
| 2003–04 | Kansas | 32 | - | 32.7 | .532 | .182 | .811 | 9.3 | 1.2 | .9 | .9 | 17.8 |
| 2004–05 | Kansas | 26 | - | 34.3 | .552 | .286 | .816 | 11.0 | 1.4 | .6 | .6 | 20.3 |
| Career | | 106 | - | 26.6 | .566 | .24 | .784 | 8.3 | 0.9 | .7 | .7 | 15.0 |

== Professional career ==
Simien was selected with the 29th overall selection of the 2005 NBA draft by the Miami Heat, with whom he won a championship in 2006. During the regular season, he appeared in 43 games (about 10 minutes per game), averaging 3 points and 2 rebounds, but only managed two postseason appearances.

Simien could not participate in the Heat's 2006 Summer League program because of a salmonella infection. His contribution during the season consisted of eight games.

Simien was traded from the Heat along with Antoine Walker and Michael Doleac to the Minnesota Timberwolves on October 24, 2007, for Ricky Davis and Mark Blount. However, on October 29, Simien was waived by the Wolves in order for them to keep their roster at the 15-player limit.

He was given a Summer League invitation by the Cleveland Cavaliers, but did not play due to a hamstring injury. He later received a training camp invitation from the Atlanta Hawks which was subsequently withdrawn. Simien joined, in October 2008, Spain's Cáceres 2016 Basket, in the country's second level.

Simien decided to retire from professional basketball on May 5, 2009, to pursue his Christian ministry called Called To Greatness. In August 2021, he took a position with the University of Kansas Athletic Department as the Associate Athletics Director for Engagement and Outreach.

== Personal life ==
Simien is a Christian. Simien married his wife, Katie, on July 8, 2006. They have 5 children.
