= 2004–05 NCAA Division I men's basketball rankings =

- Season: 2004–05
- NCAA Tournament: 2005
- Preseason No. 1: Kansas
- NCAA Tournament Champions: North Carolina
NCAA Division I men's basketball rankings


The 2004–05 NCAA Division I men's basketball rankings was made up of two human polls, the AP Poll and the Coaches Poll, in addition to various other preseason polls.

== Legend ==
	Increase in ranking
	Decrease in ranking
	New to rankings from previous week
Italics	Number of first place votes
(#–#)	Win–loss record
т	Tied with team above or below also with this symbol

== AP Poll ==
	Preseason	Week 2 Nov. 16	Week 3 Nov. 23	Week 4 Nov. 30	Week 5 Dec. 7	Week 6 Dec. 14	Week 7 Dec. 21	Week 8 Dec. 28	Week 9 Jan. 4	Week 10 Jan. 11	Week 11 Jan. 18	Week 12 Jan. 25	Week 13 Feb. 1	Week 14 Feb. 8	Week 15 Feb. 15	Week 16 Feb. 22	Week 17 Mar. 1	Week 18 Mar. 8	Final Mar. 15	
1.	Kansas (25)	Kansas (0–0)	Wake Forest (2–0) (25)	Wake Forest (5–0) (40)	Illinois (6–0) (25)	Illinois (9–0) (35)	Illinois (10–0) (50)	Illinois (11–0) (55)	Illinois (14–0) (62)	Illinois (16–0) (58)	Illinois (18–0) (58)	Illinois (19–0) (71)	Illinois (21–0) (72)	Illinois (23–0) (72)	Illinois (25–0) (72)	Illinois (27–0) (72)	Illinois (28–0) (71)	Illinois (29–1) (71)	Illinois (32–1) (72)	1.
2.	Wake Forest (22)	Wake Forest (0–0)	Kansas (1–0) (26)	Kansas (2–0) (18)	Kansas (4–0) (23)	Kansas (6–0) (22)	Kansas (7–0) (15)	Kansas (8–0) (13)	Kansas (9–0) (10)	Kansas (11–0) (13)	Kansas (13–0) (13)	Duke (15–0) (1)	North Carolina (17–2)	North Carolina (19–2)	Kansas (20–1)	North Carolina (22–3)	North Carolina (24–3)	North Carolina (26–3)	North Carolina (27–4)	2.
3.	Georgia Tech (10)	Georgia Tech (0–0)	Georgia Tech (1–0) (11)	Syracuse (5–0) (4)	Georgia Tech (5–0) (12)	Georgia Tech (6–0) (12)	Oklahoma State (8–0) (5)	Oklahoma State (9–0) (4)	North Carolina (12–1)	North Carolina (13–1) (1)	Wake Forest (15–1)	North Carolina (16–2)	Kansas (16–1)	Kansas (18–1)	Kentucky (19–2)	Boston College (22–1)	Kentucky (22–3)	Wake Forest (26–4)	Duke (25–5)	3.
4.	North Carolina (10)	North Carolina (0–0)	Syracuse (4–0) (4)	Georgia Tech (3–0) (7)	Syracuse (7–0) (9)	Oklahoma State (7–0) (3)	North Carolina (8–1)	North Carolina (9–1)	Wake Forest (12–1)	Wake Forest (13–1)	Duke (13–0)	Syracuse (19–1)	Duke (16–1)	Boston College (20–0)	North Carolina (20–3)	Oklahoma State (20–3)	Wake Forest (24–4)	Kentucky (23–4)	Louisville (29–4)	4.
5.	Illinois (2)	Syracuse (2–0)	Illinois (2–0) (1)	Illinois (4–0) (1)	Oklahoma State (5–0) (2)	North Carolina (7–1)	Wake Forest (9–1)	Wake Forest (10–1)	Duke (9–0)	Duke (11–0)	Oklahoma State (13–1)	Wake Forest (16–2)	Boston College (18–0)	Kentucky (17–2)	Wake Forest (21–3)	Kentucky (20–3)	Boston College (23–2)	Duke (22–5)	Wake Forest (26–5)	5.
6.	Syracuse	Illinois (0–0)	Oklahoma State (1–0) (2)	Oklahoma State (3–0) (2)	Wake Forest (6–1)	Wake Forest (6–1)	Duke (8–0)	Duke (8–0)	Syracuse (13–1)	Oklahoma State (11–1)	North Carolina (14–2)	Kansas (14–1)	Kentucky (16–2)	Wake Forest (19–3)	Boston College (20–1)	Wake Forest (22–4)	Duke (21–4)	Louisville (26–4)	Oklahoma State (24–6)	6.
7.	Oklahoma State (2)	Oklahoma State (0–0)	Connecticut (1–0)	Connecticut (1–0)	Connecticut (3–0) (1)	Duke (6–0)	Syracuse (9–1)	Syracuse (11–1)	Oklahoma State (9–1)	Syracuse (15–1)	Syracuse (17–1)	Kentucky (14–2)	Wake Forest (17–3)	Duke (17–2)	Duke (18–3)	Duke (19–4)	Kansas (21–4)	Boston College (24–3)	Kentucky (25–5)	7.
8.	Connecticut	Connecticut (0–0)	Kentucky (1–0) (1)	Kentucky (3–0)	North Carolina (6–1)	Syracuse (8–1)	Kentucky (7–1)	Kentucky (8–1)	Kentucky (9–1)	Georgia Tech (11–2)	Kentucky (12–2)	Boston College (16–0)	Syracuse (20–2)	Syracuse (21–2)	Oklahoma State (19–3)	Kansas (20–3)	Oklahoma State (20–5)	Arizona (25–5)	Washington (27–5)	8.
9.	Kentucky (1)	Kentucky (0–0)	Duke (1–0)	North Carolina (4–1)	Duke (5–0)	Kentucky (6–1)	Georgia Tech (7–1)	Georgia Tech (8–1)	Georgia Tech (9–2)	Kentucky (10–2)	Boston College (14–0)	Oklahoma State (14–2)	Louisville (18–3)	Louisville (20–3)	Syracuse (22–3)	Arizona (23–4)	Louisville (24–4)	Kansas (22–5)	Arizona (27–6)	9.
10.	Arizona	Arizona (0–0)	Michigan State (1–0)	Duke (3–0)	Kentucky (4–1)	Pittsburgh (7–0)	Pittsburgh (8–0)	Pittsburgh (9–0)	Connecticut (8–1)	Texas (11–2)	Washington (15–2)	Washington (16–2)	Oklahoma State (15–3)	Oklahoma State (17–3)	Arizona (21–4)	Michigan State (19–4)	Washington (23–4)	Oklahoma State (21–6)	Gonzaga (25–4)	10.
11.	Duke	Duke (0–0)	North Carolina (0–1)	Michigan State (3–0)	Pittsburgh (5–0)	Connecticut (4–1)	Connecticut (5–1)	Connecticut (6–1)	Gonzaga (10–2)	Mississippi State (14–2)	Gonzaga (13–3)	Arizona (16–3)	Alabama (17–3)	Washington (19–3)	Michigan State (17–4)	Louisville (23–4)	Arizona (24–5)	Gonzaga (24–4)	Syracuse (27–6)	11.
12.	Mississippi State	Mississippi State (2–0)	Louisville (1–0)	Maryland (3–0)	NC State (6–0)	NC State (7–0)	Washington (8–1)	Gonzaga (9–1)	Washington (12–1)	Connecticut (9–2)	Georgia Tech (11–4)	Louisville (16–3)	Michigan State (14–3)	Arizona (19–4)	Louisville (21–4)	Gonzaga (21–4)	Gonzaga (22–4)	Connecticut (21–6)	Kansas (23–6)	12.
13.	Michigan State	Michigan State (0–0)	Maryland (1–0)	Pittsburgh (3–0)	Louisville (4–1)	Louisville (5–1)	Gonzaga (8–1)	Washington (10–1)	Arizona (11–2)	Boston College (13–0)	Arizona (14–3)	Oklahoma (15–2)	Washington (17–3)	Michigan State (15–4)	Gonzaga (19–4)	Utah (23–3)	Syracuse (24–5)	Michigan State (22–5)	Connecticut (22–7)	13.
14.	Louisville	Louisville (0–0)	Mississippi State (4–1)	Washington (4–0)	Texas (5–1)	Texas (6–1)	Arizona (7–2)	Arizona (8–2)	Iowa (12–1)	Washington (13–2)	Louisville (14–3)	Alabama (15–3)	Arizona (17–4)	Gonzaga (17–4)	Utah (21–3)	Washington (21–4)	Michigan State (20–5)	Washington (24–5)	Boston College (24–4)	14.
15.	Maryland	Maryland (0–0)	Texas (1–0)	Mississippi State (5–1)	Arizona (5–2)	Arizona (6–2)	Texas (7–2)	Texas (8–2)	Texas (10–2)	Michigan State (10–2)	Texas (13–3)	Michigan State (12–3)	Oklahoma (16–3)	Utah (19–3)	Washington (20–4)	Syracuse (22–5)	Connecticut (19–6)	Utah (25–4)	Michigan State (26–6)	15.
16.	Texas	Texas (0–0)	Pittsburgh (1–0)	NC State (4–0)	Washington (5–1)	Iowa (8–1)	NC State (8–1)	Iowa (10–1)	Pittsburgh (10–1)	Gonzaga (11–3)	Connecticut (10–3)	Texas (14–4)	Pittsburgh (14–3)	Oklahoma (17–4)	Alabama (19–4)	Alabama (21–4)	Utah (24–4)	Syracuse (24–6)	Florida (23–7)	16.
17.	Pittsburgh	Pittsburgh (0–0)	NC State (3–0)	Louisville (3–1)	Iowa (6–1)	Alabama (8–1)	Iowa (9–1)	NC State (9–1)	Louisville (11–2)	Arizona (12–3)	Mississippi State (15–3)	Gonzaga (14–4)	Gonzaga (15–4)	Alabama (17–4)	Pittsburgh (17–4)	Connecticut (17–6)	Pacific (23–2)	Oklahoma (23–6)	Oklahoma (24–7)	17.
18.	Alabama	Alabama (0–0)	Arizona (2–1)	Texas (3–1)	Alabama (6–1)	Washington (7–1)	Louisville (6–2)	Alabama (10–1)	Mississippi State (12–2)	Cincinnati (13–1)	Oklahoma (13–2)	Wisconsin (13–3)	Cincinnati (17–3)	Pittsburgh (15–4)	Connecticut (15–6)	Pittsburgh (18–5)	Charlotte (21–4)	Pacific (25–2)	Utah (27–5)	18.
19.	NC State	NC State (0–0)	Alabama (2–0)	Florida (3–0)	Virginia (6–0)	George Washington (6–1)	Alabama (9–1)	Louisville (8–2)	Alabama (11–2)	Louisville (12–3)	Michigan State (10–3)	Connecticut (11–4)	Wisconsin (14–4)	Connecticut (14–5)	Pacific (20–2)	Pacific (22–2)	Villanova (19–6)	Villanova (21–6)	Villanova (22–7)	19.
20.	Notre Dame	Notre Dame (0–0)	Wisconsin (1–0)	Notre Dame (3–0)	Michigan State (4–2)	Mississippi State (7–2)	George Washington (7–1)	George Washington (8–1)	Michigan State (8–2)	Pittsburgh (11–2)	Cincinnati (14–2)	Pittsburgh (13–3)	Texas (15–5)	Wisconsin (15–5)	Wisconsin (16–6)	Wisconsin (17–6)	Oklahoma (21–6)	Alabama (23–6)	Wisconsin (22–8)	20.
21.	Wisconsin	Wisconsin (0–0)	Notre Dame (1–0)	Arizona (3–2)	George Washington (5–1)	Michigan State (5–2)	Mississippi State (9–2)	Mississippi State (11–2)	West Virginia (10–0)	George Washington (10–2)	Pittsburgh (12–2)	Cincinnati (15–3)	Utah (17–3)	Cincinnati (17–5)	Oklahoma (17–6)	Charlotte (19–4)	Alabama (21–6)	Cincinnati (24–6)	Alabama (24–7)	21.
22.	Washington	Washington (0–0)	Washington (1–0)	Alabama (4–1)	Mississippi State (6–2)	Gonzaga (7–1)	Cincinnati (7–0)	Cincinnati (9–0)	Maryland (8–2)	Marquette (13–1)	Alabama (13–3)	Georgia Tech (11–5)	Maryland (13–5)	Villanova (13–5)	Maryland (15–7)	Oklahoma (19–6)	Cincinnati (22–6)	Pittsburgh (20–7)	Pacific (26–3)	22.
23.	Florida	Florida (0–0)	Florida (1–0)	Iowa (3–1)	Maryland (4–2)	Maryland (5–2)	Michigan State (6–2)	Michigan State (7–2)	Cincinnati (11–1)	Alabama (12–3)	Iowa (13–3)	Iowa (14–4)	Connecticut (12–5)	Texas (15–6)	Charlotte (17–4)	Villanova (17–6)	Wisconsin (18–7)	Wisconsin (20–7)	Cincinnati (24–7)	23.
24.	Memphis	Memphis (2–0)	Gonzaga (2–0)	Virginia (4–0)	Wisconsin (4–1)	Virginia (7–1)	Maryland (6–2)	Maryland (7–2)	George Washington (8–2)	Iowa (12–3)	Wisconsin (12–3)	Mississippi State (16–4)	Villanova (12–4)	Pacific (18–2)	Cincinnati (18–6)	Cincinnati (20–6)	Pittsburgh (18–7)	Nevada (–)	Texas Tech (20–10)	24.
25.	Gonzaga	Gonzaga (0–0)	Memphis (3–1)	Wisconsin (2–1)	Gonzaga (5–1)	Cincinnati (6–0)	Virginia (7–1)	Virginia (8–1)	Boston College (11–0)	Oklahoma (11–2)	Marquette (14–2)	Utah (16–3)	Georgia Tech (12–6)	Texas Tech (14–5)	Villanova (14–6)	Nevada (20–5)	Nevada (22–5)	Charlotte (21–6)	Georgia Tech (19–11)	25.
	Preseason	Week 2 Nov. 16	Week 3 Nov. 23	Week 4 Nov. 30	Week 5 Dec. 7	Week 6 Dec. 14	Week 7 Dec. 21	Week 8 Dec. 28	Week 9 Jan. 4	Week 10 Jan. 11	Week 11 Jan. 18	Week 12 Jan. 25	Week 13 Feb. 1	Week 14 Feb. 8	Week 15 Feb. 15	Week 16 Feb. 22	Week 17 Mar. 1	Week 18 Mar. 8	Final Mar. 15	
		None	None	Dropped: Gonzaga; Memphis	Dropped: Florida; Notre Dame	Dropped: Wisconsin	None	None	Dropped: NC State; Virginia	Dropped: West Virginia; Maryland	Dropped: George Washington	Dropped: Marquette	Dropped: Iowa; Mississippi State	Dropped: Maryland; Georgia Tech	Dropped: Texas; Texas Tech	Dropped: Maryland	None	None	Dropped: Pittsburgh (20–8); Nevada (24–6); Charlotte (21–7)	

== Coaches Poll ==
	Preseason	Week 2 Nov. 23	Week 3 Nov. 30	Week 4 Dec. 7	Week 5 Dec. 14	Week 6 Dec. 21	Week 7 Dec. 28	Week 8 Jan. 4	Week 9 Jan. 11	Week 10 Jan. 18	Week 11 Jan. 25	Week 12 Feb. 1	Week 13 Feb. 8	Week 14 Feb. 15	Week 15 Feb. 22	Week 16 Mar. 1	Week 17 Mar. 8	Week 18 Mar. 15	Final Apr. 5	
1.	Kansas (8)	Wake Forest (2–0) (15)	Wake Forest (5–0) (22)	Illinois (6–0) (18)	Illinois (9–0) (21)	Illinois (10–0) (24)	Illinois (11–0) (25)	Illinois (14–0) (27)	Illinois (16–0) (25)	Illinois (18–0) (27)	Illinois (19–0) (31)	Illinois (21–0) (31)	Illinois (23–0) (31)	Illinois (25–0) (31)	Illinois (27–0) (31)	Illinois (28–0) (31)	Illinois (29–1) (21)	Illinois (32–1) ()	North Carolina (33–4)	1.
2.	Wake Forest (12)	Kansas (1–0) (12)	Kansas (2–0) (5)	Kansas (4–0) (10)	Kansas (6–0) (6)	Kansas (7–0) (5)	Kansas (8–0) (4)	Kansas (9–0) (4)	Kansas (11–0) (4)	Kansas (13–0) (4)	Duke (15–0)	North Carolina (17–2)	North Carolina (19–2)	Kansas (20–1)	North Carolina (22–3)	North Carolina (24–3)	North Carolina (26–3) (10)	Duke (25–5)	Illinois (37–2)	2.
3.	North Carolina (6)	Georgia Tech (1–0) (1)	Illinois (4–0) (1)	Georgia Tech (5–0) (2)	Georgia Tech (6–0) (2)	Oklahoma State (8–0) (2)	Oklahoma State (9–0) (2)	Wake Forest (12–1)	Wake Forest (13–1)	Wake Forest (15–1)	North Carolina (16–2)	Kansas (16–1)	Kansas (18–1)	Kentucky (19–2)	Boston College (22–1)	Kentucky (22–3)	Wake Forest (26–4)	North Carolina (27–4)	Louisville (33–5)	3.
4.	Georgia Tech (1)	Illinois (2–0) (1)	Georgia Tech (3–0) (1)	Syracuse (7–0)	Oklahoma State (7–0) (2)	Wake Forest (9–1)	Wake Forest (10–1)	North Carolina (12–1)	North Carolina (13–1) (2)	Duke (13–0)	Syracuse (19–1)	Kentucky (16–2)	Boston College (20–0)	North Carolina (20–3)	Oklahoma State (20–3)	Wake Forest (24–4)	Kentucky (23–4)	Louisville (29–4)	Michigan State (26–7)	4.
5.	Illinois (1)	Syracuse (4–0)	Syracuse (5–0)	Oklahoma State (5–0) (1)	Wake Forest (6–1)	North Carolina (8–1)	North Carolina (9–1)	Duke (9–0)	Duke (11–0)	Oklahoma State (13–1)	Wake Forest (16–2)	Boston College (18–0)	Kentucky (17–2)	Wake Forest (21–3)	Kentucky (20–3)	Boston College (23–2)	Duke (22–5)	Kentucky (25–5)	Kentucky (28–6)	5.
6.	Syracuse	Connecticut (1–0)	Connecticut (1–0)	Connecticut (3–0)	North Carolina (7–1)	Duke (8–0)	Duke (8–0)	Oklahoma State (9–1)	Oklahoma State (11–1)	North Carolina (14–2)	Kentucky (14–2)	Duke (16–1)	Wake Forest (19–3)	Boston College (20–1)	Wake Forest (22–4)	Duke (21–4)	Louisville (26–4)	Wake Forest (26–5)	Arizona (30–7)	6.
7.	Connecticut	Oklahoma State (1–0) (1)	Oklahoma State (3–0) (1)	Wake Forest (6–1)	Duke (6–0)	Pittsburgh (8–0)	Pittsburgh (9–0)	Syracuse (13–1)	Syracuse (15–1)	Syracuse (17–1)	Kansas (14–1)	Wake Forest (17–3)	Syracuse (21–2)	Oklahoma State (19–3)	Kansas (20–3)	Kansas (21–4)	Boston College (24–3)	Washington (27–5)	Duke (27–6)	7.
8.	Oklahoma State (1)	Kentucky (1–0) (1)	Kentucky (3–0) (1)	North Carolina (6–1)	Syracuse (8–1)	Syracuse (9–1)	Syracuse (11–1)	Kentucky (9–1)	Georgia Tech (11–2)	Kentucky (12–2)	Boston College (16–0)	Syracuse (20–2)	Duke (17–2)	Duke (18–3)	Arizona (23–4)	Oklahoma State (20–5)	Arizona (25–5)	Oklahoma State (24–6)	Oklahoma State (26–7)	8.
9.	Kentucky	Michigan State (1–0)	Michigan State (3–0)	Duke (5–0)	NC State (7–0)	Georgia Tech (7–1)	Georgia Tech (8–1)	Connecticut (8–1)	Texas (12–2)	Boston College (14–0)	Oklahoma State (14–2)	Louisville (18–3)	Louisville (20–3)	Syracuse (22–3)	Michigan State (19–4)	Louisville (24–4)	Kansas (22–5)	Arizona (27–6)	Washington (29–6)	9.
10.	Michigan State	Duke (1–0)	Duke (3–0)	NC State (6–0)	Pittsburgh (7–0)	Kentucky (7–1)	Kentucky (8–1)	Georgia Tech (9–2)	Kentucky (10–2)	Washington (15–2)	Washington (16–2)	Michigan State (14–3)	Oklahoma State (17–3)	Michigan State (17–4)	Duke (19–4)	Washington (23–4)	Michigan State (22–5)	Kansas (23–6)	Wisconsin (25–9)	10.
11.	Arizona (1)	Louisville (1–0)	North Carolina (4–1)	Kentucky (4–1)	Kentucky (6–1)	Connecticut (5–1)	Connecticut (6–1)	Texas (10–2)	Connecticut (9–2)	Texas (13–3)	Arizona (16–3)	Oklahoma State (15–3)	Washington (19–3)	Arizona (21–4)	Louisville (23–4)	Arizona (24–5)	Oklahoma State (21–6)	Gonzaga (25–4)	Wake Forest (27–6)	11.
12.	Duke	North Carolina (0–1)	Maryland (3–0)	Pittsburgh (5–0)	Texas (6–1)	Texas (7–2)	Texas (8–2)	Pittsburgh (10–1)	Michigan State (10–2)	Arizona (14–3)	Louisville (16–3)	Washington (17–3)	Michigan State (15–4)	Louisville (21–4)	Utah (23–3)	Michigan State (20–5)	Gonzaga (24–4)	Boston College (24–4)	West Virginia (24–11)	12.
13.	Louisville (1)	Texas (1–0)	NC State (4–0)	Texas (5–1)	Connecticut (4–1)	NC State (8–1)	Alabama (10–1)	Arizona (11–2)	Cincinnati (13–1)	Connecticut (10–3)	Texas (14–4) т	Arizona (17–4)	Arizona (19–4)	Washington (20–4) т	Washington (21–4)	Gonzaga (22–4) т	Washington (24–5)	Syracuse (27–6)	Villanova (24–8)	13.
14.	Mississippi State	Maryland (1–0)	Pittsburgh (3–0)	Louisville (4–1)	Louisville (5–1)	Alabama (9–1)	Arizona (8–2)	Washington (12–1)	Washington (13–2)	Louisville (14–3)	Michigan State (12–3) т	Alabama (17–3)	Connecticut (14–5)	Utah (21–3) т	Alabama (21–4)	Syracuse (24–5) т	Connecticut (21–6)	Connecticut (22–7)	Utah (29–6)	14.
15.	Texas	Pittsburgh (1–0)	Texas (3–1)	Arizona (5–2)	Alabama (8–1)	Arizona (7–2)	NC State (9–1)	Iowa (12–1)	Mississippi State (14–2)	Georgia Tech (11–4)	Oklahoma (15–2)	Pittsburgh (14–3)	Utah (19–3) т	Pittsburgh (17–4)	Syracuse (22–5)	Utah (24–4)	Utah (25–4)	Michigan State (26–6)	Kansas (23–7)	15.
16.	Maryland	NC State (3–0)	Washington (4–0)	Michigan State (4–2)	Arizona (6–2)	Cincinnati (7–0)	Washington (10–1)	Louisville (11–2)	Arizona (12–3)	Michigan State (10–3)	Connecticut (11–4)	Oklahoma (16–3)	Pittsburgh (15–4) т	Gonzaga (19–4)	Gonzaga (21–4)	Connecticut (19–6)	Pacific (25–2)	Oklahoma (24–7)	Texas Tech (22–11)	16.
17.	Pittsburgh	Wisconsin (1–0) т	Louisville (3–1)	Maryland (4–2)	Cincinnati (6–0)	Washington (8–1)	Cincinnati (9–0)	Gonzaga (10–2)	Boston College (13–0)	Pittsburgh (12–2)	Alabama (15–3)	Cincinnati (17–3)	Gonzaga (17–4)	Alabama (19–4)	Pittsburgh (18–5)	Pacific (23–2)	Oklahoma (23–6)	Utah (27–5)	Connecticut (23–8)	17.
18.	Alabama	Arizona (2–1) т	Florida (3–0)	Alabama (6–1)	Michigan State (5–2)	Louisville (6–2)	Iowa (10–1)	Alabama (11–2)	Pittsburgh (11–2)	Cincinnati (14–2)	Pittsburgh (13–3)	Texas (15–5)	Oklahoma (17–4)	Connecticut (15–6)	Pacific (22–2)	Charlotte (21–4)	Syracuse (24–6)	Florida (23–7)	Gonzaga (26–5)	18.
19.	NC State	Alabama (2–0)	Notre Dame (3–0)	Virginia (6–0)	Maryland (5–2)	Iowa (9–1)	Louisville (8–2)	Michigan State (8–2)	Louisville (12–3)	Mississippi State (15–3)	Wisconsin (13–3)	Wisconsin (14–4)	Alabama (17–4)	Pacific (20–2)	Connecticut (17–6)	Alabama (21–6)	Alabama (23–6)	Wisconsin (22–8)	Boston College (25–5)	19.
20.	Wisconsin	Mississippi State (4–1)	Arizona (3–2)	Cincinnati (4–0)	Washington (7–1)	Michigan State (6–2)	Michigan State (7–2)	Cincinnati (11–1)	Gonzaga (11–3)	Gonzaga (13–3)	Cincinnati (15–3)	Connecticut (12–5)	Cincinnati (17–5)	Wisconsin (16–6)	Wisconsin (17–6)	Oklahoma (21–6)	Cincinnati (24–6)	Pacific (26–3)	Oklahoma (25–8)	20.
21.	Notre Dame	Notre Dame (1–0)	Mississippi State (5–1)	Washington (5–1)	Iowa (8–1)	Maryland (6–2)	Gonzaga (9–1)	Maryland (8–2)	Alabama (12–3)	Oklahoma (13–2)	Georgia Tech (11–5)	Gonzaga (15–4)	Wisconsin (15–5)	Cincinnati (18–6)	Charlotte (19–4)	Cincinnati (22–6)	Villanova (21–6)	Alabama (24–7)	Syracuse (27–7)	21.
22.	Florida	Florida (1–0)	Alabama (4–1)	Wisconsin (4–1)	George Washington (6–1)	George Washington (7–1)	George Washington (8–1)	Mississippi State (12–2)	George Washington (10–2)	Alabama (13–3)	Mississippi State (16–4)	Utah (17–3)	Texas (15–6)	Oklahoma (17–6)	Cincinnati (20–6)	Villanova (19–6)	Wisconsin (20–7)	Villanova (22–7)	NC State (21–14)	22.
23.	Memphis	Washington (1–0)	Wisconsin (2–1)	Mississippi State (6–2)	Virginia (7–1)	Gonzaga (8–1)	Maryland (7–2)	West Virginia (10–0)	Iowa (12–3)	Wisconsin (12–3)	Gonzaga (14–4)	Georgia Tech (12–6)	Texas Tech (14–5)	Charlotte (17–4)	Oklahoma (19–6)	Wisconsin (18–7)	Pittsburgh (20–7)	Cincinnati (24–7)	Wisconsin-Milwaukee (26–6)	23.
24.	Washington	Memphis (3–1)	Cincinnati (3–0)	Iowa (6–1)	Mississippi State (7–2)	Mississippi State (9–2)	Mississippi State (11–2)	NC State (10–3)	West Virginia (11–1)	Iowa (13–3)	Iowa (14–4)	Maryland (13–5)	Pacific (18–2)	Florida (15–6)	Villanova (17–6)	Pittsburgh (18–7)	Charlotte (21–6)	Texas Tech (20–10)	Florida (24–8)	24.
25.	Stanford	Gonzaga (2–0)	Virginia (4–0)	George Washington (5–1)	Marquette (9–0)	Virginia (7–1)	Virginia (8–1)	George Washington (8–2)	Oklahoma (11–2)	Marquette (14–2)	Utah (16–3)	Villanova (12–4)	Villanova (13–5)	Texas Tech (15–6)	Texas Tech (16–7)	Southern Illinois (24–6)	Florida (20–7)	Georgia Tech (19–11)	Cincinnati (25–8)	25.
	Preseason	Week 2 Nov. 23	Week 3 Nov. 30	Week 4 Dec. 7	Week 5 Dec. 14	Week 6 Dec. 21	Week 7 Dec. 28	Week 8 Jan. 4	Week 9 Jan. 11	Week 10 Jan. 18	Week 11 Jan. 25	Week 12 Feb. 1	Week 13 Feb. 8	Week 14 Feb. 15	Week 15 Feb. 22	Week 16 Mar. 1	Week 17 Mar. 8	Week 18 Mar. 15	Final Apr. 5	
		Dropped: Stanford	Dropped: Memphis; Gonzaga	Dropped: Florida; Notre Dame	Dropped: Wisconsin	Dropped: Marquette	None	Dropped: Virginia	Dropped: Maryland; NC State	Dropped: George Washington; West Virginia	Dropped: Marquette	Dropped: Mississippi State; Iowa	Dropped: Georgia Tech; Maryland	Dropped: Texas; Villanova	Dropped: Florida	Dropped: Texas Tech	Dropped: Southern Illinois	Dropped: Pittsburgh; Charlotte	Dropped: Alabama (24–8); Pacific (26–4); Georgia Tech (19–12)	
