= 2004–05 Big East Conference men's basketball season =

American college basketball season

2004–05 Big East Conference Men's Basketball Season
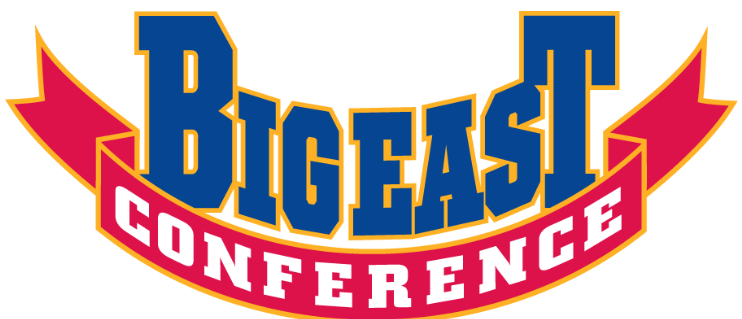
- League: NCAA Division I
- Sport: Basketball
- Duration: November 19, 2004 through March 12, 2005
- Teams: 12
- TV partner: ESPN

Regular Season
- Champion: Boston College and Connecticut (13–3)
- Season MVP: Hakim Warrick – Syracuse

Tournament
- Champions: Syracuse
- Finals MVP: Hakim Warrick – Syracuse

Basketball seasons
- 2003–04 2005–06

2004–05 Big East men's basketball standings
	Conf.				Overall
Team	W		L	PCT	W		L	PCT
No. 14 Boston College	13	–	3	.813	25	–	5	.833
No. 13 Connecticut	13	–	3	.813	23	–	8	.742
No. 19 Villanova	11	–	5	.688	24	–	8	.750
Pittsburgh	10	–	6	.625	20	–	9	.690
Notre Dame	9	–	7	.563	17	–	12	.586
Georgetown	8	–	8	.500	19	–	13	.594
West Virginia	8	–	8	.500	24	–	11	.686
Providence	4	–	12	.250	14	–	17	.452
Seton Hall	4	–	12	.250	12	–	16	.429
Rutgers	2	–	14	.125	10	–	19	.345
St. John's*	3	–	13	.188	9	–	18	.333
No. 11 Syracuse†**	0	–	5	.000	12	–	7	.632
† 2005 Big East tournament winner As of April 4, 2005; Rankings from AP Poll; *Not eligible for the 2005 Big East tournament due to sanctions against the program. **Syracuse had 15 regular season games vacated due to sanctions against the program; Syracuse′s disputed record was 27–7, 11–5.

The 2004–05 Big East Conference men's basketball season was the 26th in conference history, and involved its 12 full-time member schools.

Boston College and Connecticut were the regular-season co-champions with identical records of 13–3. Syracuse won the Big East tournament championship.

== Season summary & highlights ==
- The Big East contracted for the first time when Miami and Virginia Tech left to join the Atlantic Coast Conference before the season. The Big East's membership dropped from 14 to 12 teams.
- Syracuse was the champion of the 2004 Coaches vs. Cancer Classic.
- Boston College and Connecticut were the regular-season co-champions with identical records of 13–3. It was Boston College's sixth and Connecticut's ninth conference championship or co-championship.
- Syracuse won its fourth Big East tournament championship.
- St. John's was ineligible for the Big East tournament or any other postseason play due to sanctions against the program.
- Due to NCAA sanctions imposed in March 2015 because of the Syracuse University athletics scandal, 15 of Syracuse's wins this season later were vacated. Despite this, Syracuse retained its 2005 Big East Tournament championship.
- This was Boston College's 26th and last season as a member of the Big East Conference. A member of the Big East from the conference's first season in 1979–80, Boston College moved to the Atlantic Coast Conference after the end of the season.

== Head coaches ==
School	Coach	Season	Notes
Boston College	Al Skinner	8th	Big East Coach of the Year (2nd award)
Connecticut	Jim Calhoun	19th	
Georgetown	John Thompson III	1st	
Notre Dame	Mike Brey	5th	
Pittsburgh	Jamie Dixon	2nd	
Providence	Tim Welsh	7th	
Rutgers	Gary Waters	4th	
St. John's	Norm Roberts	1st	
Seton Hall	Louis Orr	4th	
Syracuse	Jim Boeheim	29th	
Villanova	Jay Wright	4th	
West Virginia	John Beilein	3rd	

== Rankings ==
Connecticut and Syracuse were ranked in the Associated Press poll Top 25 all season, with Syracuse reaching No. 3. Boston College, Notre Dame, Pittsburgh, Villanova, and West Virginia also appeared in the Top 25, with Boston College also reaching No. 3. Boston College, Connecticut, Syracuse, and Villanova all finished the season as ranked teams.

2004–05 Big East Conference Weekly Rankings Key: ██ Increase in ranking. ██ Decrease in ranking.
AP Poll	Pre	11/15	11/22	11/29	12/6	12/13	12/20	12/27	1/3	1/10	1/17	1/24	1/31	2/7	2/14	2/21	2/28	3/7	Final
Boston College									25	13	9	8	5	4	6	3	5	7	14
Connecticut	8	8	7	7	7	11	11	11	10	12	16	19	23	19	18	17	15	12	13
Georgetown																			
Notre Dame	20	20	21	20															
Pittsburgh	17	17	16	13	11	10	10	10	16	20	21	20	16	18	17	18	24	22	
Providence																			
Rutgers																			
St. John's																			
Seton Hall																			
Syracuse	6	5	4	3	4	8	7	7	6	7	7	4	8	8	9	15	13	16	11
Villanova													24	22	25	23	19	19	19
West Virginia									21										

== Regular-season statistical leaders ==
Scoring
Name	School	PPG
Ryan Gomes	Prov	21.6
Hakim Warrick	Syr	21.4
Daryll Hill	SJU	20.7
Craig Smith	BC	18.0
Jared Dudley	BC	16.5

Rebounding
Name	School	RPG
Hakim Warrick	Syr	8.6
Craig Smith	BC	8.5
Josh Boone	Conn	8.4
Charlie Villanueva	Conn	8.3
Ryan Gomes	Prov	8.2

Assists
Name	School	APG
Marcus Williams	Conn	7.8
Chris Thomas	ND	6.7
Carl Krauser	Pitt	5.9
Gerry McNamara	Syr	4.9
Louis Hinnant	BC	4.8

Steals
Name	School	SPG
Randy Foye	Vill	2.1
Chris Thomas	ND	2.1
Gerry McNamara	Syr	1.9
Cedric Jackson	SJU	1.8
Daryll Hill	SJU	1.8

Blocks
Name	School	BPG
Josh Boone	Conn	2.9
Jason Fraser	Vill	2.4
Sean Williams	BC	2.3
Randall Hanke	Prov	2.1
D'or Fischer	WVU	1.9

Field Goals
Name	School	FG%
Chris Taft	Pitt	.580
Chevon Troutman	Pitt	.566
Hakim Warrick	Syr	.548
Charlie Villanueva	Conn	.521
Craig Smith	BC	.504

3-Pt Field Goals
Name	School	3FG%
Colin Falls	ND	.413
Allan Ray	Vill	.376
Gerry McNamara	Syr	.340
No other qualifiers

Free Throws
Name	School	FT%
Chris Thomas	ND	.891
Gerry McNamara	Syr	.874
Jermaine Watson	BC	.830
Allan Ray	Vill	.828
Curtis Sumpter	Vill	.810

== Postseason ==
=== Big East tournament ===
==== Seeding ====
St. John's was ineligible for the Big East tournament because of sanctions against the program. The other 11 teams were seeded in the tournament based on conference record and tiebreakers. The No. 6 through No. 11 seeds played in the first round, and the No. 1 through No. 5 seeds received byes into the quarterfinal round.

Seeding was (1) Boston College, (2) Connecticut, (3) Syracuse, (4) Villanova, (5) Pittsburgh, (6) Notre Dame, (7) Georgetown, (8) West Virginia, (9) Providence, (10) Seton Hall, and (11) Rutgers.

==== Bracket ====
First round Wednesday, March 9
8	West Virginia	82
9	Providence	59
7	Georgetown	56
10	Seton Hall	51
6	Notre Dame	65
11	Rutgers	72

Quarterfinals; Thursday, March 10
1	#7 Boston College	72
8	West Virginia	78
4	#19 Villanova	67
5	#22 Pittsburgh	58
2	#12 Connecticut	66
7	Georgetown	62
3	#16 Syracuse	81
11	Rutgers	57

Semifinals; Friday, March 11
8	West Virginia	78
4	#19 Villanova	76
2	#12 Connecticut	63
3	#16 Syracuse	67

Final; Saturday, March 12
8	West Virginia	59
3	#16 Syracuse	68

=== NCAA tournament ===
Six Big East teams received bids to the NCAA Tournament. Pittsburgh and Syracuse lost in the first round and Boston College and Connecticut lost in the second round. Villanova was defeated in the regional semifinals and West Virginia in the regional finals.

School	Region	Seed	Round 1	Round 2	Sweet 16	Elite 8
West Virginia	Albuquerque	7	10 Creighton, W 63–61	2 Wake Forest, W 111–105^{(2OT)}	6 Texas Tech, W 65–60	4 Alabama, L 93–85^{(OT)}
Villanova	Syracuse	5	12 New Mexico, W 55–47	4 Florida, W 76–65	1 North Carolina, L 67–66	
Connecticut	Syracuse	2	15 UCF, W 77–71	10 NC State, L 65–62		
Boston College	Chicago	4	13 Penn, W 85–65	12 Milwaukee, L 83–75		
Syracuse	Austin	4	13 Vermont, L 60–57^{(OT)}			
Pittsburgh	Albuquerque	9	8 Pacific, L 79–71			

=== National Invitation Tournament ===
Two Big East teams received bids to the National Invitation Tournament, which did not yet have seeding. They played in two of the tournament's four unnamed brackets. Notre Dame lost in the first round and Georgetown in the quarterfinals.

School	Opening round	Round 1	Round 2	Quarterfinals
Georgetown	Bye	Boston University, W 64–34	Cal State Fullerton, W 74–57	South Carolina, L 69–66
Notre Dame	Bye	Holy Cross, L 78–73		

== Awards and honors ==
=== Big East Conference ===
Player of the Year:

- Hakim Warrick, Syracuse, F, Sr.

Defensive Player of the Year:

- Josh Boone, Connecticut, C, So.

Co-Rookies of the Year:

- Rudy Gay, Connecticut, F, Fr.
- Jeff Green, Georgetown, F, Fr.

Co-Most Improved Players:

- Jared Dudley, Boston College, F, So.
- Marcus Williams, Connecticut, G, So.

Coach of the Year:

- Al Skinner, Boston College (8th season)

All-Big East First Team

- Craig Smith, Boston College, F, Jr., 6 ft 7 in (201 cm), 250 lb (113 kg), Inglewood, Calif.
- Jared Dudley, Boston College, F, So., 6 ft 7 in (201 cm), 225 lb (102 kg), San Diego, Calif.
- Chevon Troutman, Pittsburgh, F, Sr., 6 ft 7 in (201 cm), 240 lb (109 kg), Scranton, Pa.
- Ryan Gomes, Providence, F, Sr., 6 ft 7 in (201 cm), 250 lb (113 kg), Waterbury, Conn.
- Gerry McNamara, Syracuse, G, Jr., 6 ft 2 in (188 cm), 182 lb (83 kg), Scranton, Pa.
- Hakim Warrick, Syracuse, F, Sr., 6 ft 9 in (206 cm), 219 lb (99 kg), Philadelphia, Pa.

All-Big East Second Team:

- Charlie Villanueva, Connecticut, F, So., 6 ft 11 in (211 cm), 240 lb (109 kg), Brooklyn, N.Y.
- Josh Boone, Connecticut, C, So., 6 ft 10 in (208 cm), 237 lb (108 kg), Mount Airy, Md.
- Carl Krauser, Pittsburgh, G, Jr., 6 ft 2 in (188 cm), 200 lb (91 kg), The Bronx, N.Y.
- Allan Ray, Villanova, G, Jr., 6 ft 2 in (188 cm), 190 lb (86 kg), The Bronx, N.Y.
- Curtis Sumpter, Villanova, F, Jr., 6 ft 7 in (201 cm), 225 lb (102 kg), Brooklyn, N.Y.

All-Big East Third Team:

- Marcus Williams, Connecticut, G, So., 6 ft 3 in (191 cm), 205 lb (93 kg), Los Angeles, Calif.
- Brandon Bowman, Georgetown, F, Jr., 6 ft 9 in (206 cm), 223 lb (101 kg), Beverly Hills, Calif.
- Chris Thomas, Notre Dame, G, Sr., 6 ft 1 in (185 cm), 190 lb (86 kg), Indianapolis, Ind.
- Daryll Hill, St. John's, G, So., 6 ft 0 in (183 cm), 168 lb (76 kg), Queens, N.Y.
- Randy Foye, Villanova, G, Jr., 6 ft 4 in (193 cm), 210 lb (95 kg), Newark, N.J.

Big East All-Rookie Team:

- Sean Williams, Boston College, F, Fr., 6 ft 10 in (208 cm), 235 lb (107 kg), Houston, Tex.
- Rudy Gay, Connecticut, F, Fr., 6 ft 9 in (206 cm), 220 lb (100 kg), Baltimore, Md.
- Jeff Green, Georgetown, F, Fr., 6 ft 9 in (206 cm), 235 lb (107 kg), Hyattsville, Md.
- Ronald Ramón, Pittsburgh, G, Fr., 6 ft 1 in (185 cm), 185 lb (84 kg), The Bronx, N.Y.
- Ollie Bailey, Rutgers, F, Fr., 6 ft 7 in (201 cm), 230 lb (104 kg), Chicago, Ill.
- Kyle Lowry, Villanova, G, Fr., 6 ft 0 in (183 cm), 175 lb (79 kg), Philadelphia, Pa.

=== All-Americans ===
The following players were selected to the 2005 Associated Press All-America teams.

Consensus All-America First Team:

- Hakim Warrick, Syracuse, Key Stats: 21.4 ppg, 8.6 rpg, 1.5 apg, 1.0 spg, 54.8 FG%, 726 points

First Team All-America:

- Hakim Warrick, Syracuse, Key Stats: 21.4 ppg, 8.6 rpg, 1.5 apg, 1.0 spg, 54.8 FG%, 726 points

AP Honorable Mention

- Josh Boone, Connecticut
- Jared Dudley, Boston College
- Ryan Gomes, Providence
- Craig Smith, Boston College

== See also ==
- 2004–05 NCAA Division I men's basketball season
- 2004–05 Boston College Eagles men's basketball team
- 2004–05 Connecticut Huskies men's basketball team
- 2004–05 Georgetown Hoyas men's basketball team
- 2004–05 Pittsburgh Panthers men's basketball team
- 2004–05 St. John's Red Storm men's basketball team
- 2004–05 Syracuse Orange men's basketball team
- 2004–05 Villanova Wildcats men's basketball team
- 2004–05 West Virginia Mountaineers men's basketball team
