= 2004–05 Villanova Wildcats men's basketball team =

American college basketball season

2004–05 Villanova Wildcats men's basketball

NCAA tournament, Sweet Sixteen
- Conference: Big East Conference

Ranking
- Coaches: No. 13
- AP: No. 19
- Record: 24–8 (11–5 Big East)
- Head coach: Jay Wright (4th season)
- Assistant coaches: Brett Gunning (4th season); Ed Pinckney (2nd season); Pat Chambers (1st season)
- Home arena: Wachovia Center; The Pavilion

2004–05 Big East men's basketball standings
| | Conf. | | | | Overall |
| Team | W | | L | PCT | W | | L | PCT |
|---|---|---|---|---|---|---|---|---|
| No. 14 Boston College | 13 | – | 3 | .813 | 25 | – | 5 | .833 |
| No. 13 Connecticut | 13 | – | 3 | .813 | 23 | – | 8 | .742 |
| No. 19 Villanova | 11 | – | 5 | .688 | 24 | – | 8 | .750 |
| Pittsburgh | 10 | – | 6 | .625 | 20 | – | 9 | .690 |
| Notre Dame | 9 | – | 7 | .563 | 17 | – | 12 | .586 |
| Georgetown | 8 | – | 8 | .500 | 19 | – | 13 | .594 |
| West Virginia | 8 | – | 8 | .500 | 24 | – | 11 | .686 |
| Providence | 4 | – | 12 | .250 | 14 | – | 17 | .452 |
| Seton Hall | 4 | – | 12 | .250 | 12 | – | 16 | .429 |
| Rutgers | 2 | – | 14 | .125 | 10 | – | 19 | .345 |
| St. John's* | 3 | – | 13 | .188 | 9 | – | 18 | .333 |
| No. 11 Syracuse†** | 0 | – | 5 | .000 | 12 | – | 7 | .632 |
† 2005 Big East tournament winner As of April 4, 2005; Rankings from AP Poll; *Not eligible for the 2005 Big East tournament due to sanctions against the program. **Syracuse had 15 regular season games vacated due to sanctions against the program; Syracuse′s disputed record was 27–7, 11–5.

The 2004–05 Villanova Wildcats men's basketball team represented Villanova University in the 2004–05 college basketball season.

Villanova, led by head coach Jay Wright, put together a strong season that formed the foundation of Villanova’s re-emergence as a college basketball elite. Utilizing a starting lineup that consisted of non-seniors (juniors Randy Foye, Jason Fraser, Allan Ray, and Curtis Sumpter, along with sophomore Mike Nardi, the Wildcats played a fast-paced style of basketball that became a common topic of intrigue among analysts. Villanova entered the NCAA tournament as the No. 5 seed in the Syracuse region and made a Sweet Sixteen appearance before losing to eventual champion North Carolina. This was the first of two consecutive years the Wildcats would bow out of the tournament after facing the eventual champion.

== Roster ==
2004–05 Villanova Wildcats men's basketball team
Players
Coaches

| Pos. | # | Name | Height | Weight | Year | Hometown |
|---|---|---|---|---|---|---|
| G | 1 | Kyle Lowry | 6 ft 0 in (1.83 m) | 175 lb (79 kg) | Fr | Philadelphia, Pennsylvania |
| G | 2 | Randy Foye | 6 ft 4 in (1.93 m) | 210 lb (95 kg) | Jr | Newark, New Jersey |
| G | 4 | Ross Condon | 5 ft 11 in (1.8 m) | 180 lb (82 kg) | So | Springfield, Virginia |
| G | 10 | Tom Grace | 6 ft 0 in (1.83 m) | 175 lb (79 kg) | Sr | Catonsville, Maryland |
| G | 12 | Mike Nardi | 6 ft 2 in (1.88 m) | 170 lb (77 kg) | So | Linden, New Jersey |
| G | 14 | Allan Ray | 6 ft 2 in (1.88 m) | 190 lb (86 kg) | Jr | Bronx, New York |
| C | 20 | Jason Fraser | 6 ft 10 in (2.08 m) | 227 lb (103 kg) | Jr | Amityville, New York |
| F | 21 | Chris Charles | 7 ft 0 in (2.13 m) | 222 lb (101 kg) | Jr | Milwaukee, Wisconsin |
| G | 22 | Baker Dunleavy | 6 ft 5 in (1.96 m) | 205 lb (93 kg) | So | Portland, Oregon |
| F | 34 | Curtis Sumpter | 6 ft 7 in (2.01 m) | 225 lb (102 kg) | Jr | Brooklyn, New York |
| F | 44 | Marcus Austin | 6 ft 9 in (2.06 m) | 231 lb (105 kg) | Sr | Irvington, New Jersey |
| F | 50 | Will Sheridan | 6 ft 8 in (2.03 m) | 240 lb (109 kg) | So | Bear, Delaware |

Head coach

- Jay Wright

Assistant coach(es)

Legend

- (C) Team captain
- (S) Suspended
- (I) Ineligible
- (W) Walk-on
- Injured
- Current redshirt

== Schedule ==
| Date time, TV | Rank^{#} | Opponent^{#} | Result | Record | Site city, state |
Regular season
| Nov 23, 2004* | | UMBC | W 66–41 | 1–0 | Wachovia Center; Philadelphia, Pennsylvania |
| Dec 4, 2004* | | vs. Temple | L 52–53 | 1–1 | The Palestra; Philadelphia, Pennsylvania |
| Dec 7, 2004* | | Monmouth | W 70–50 | 2–1 | Wachovia Center; Philadelphia, Pennsylvania |
| Dec 11, 2004* | | vs. La Salle | W 54–43 | 3–1 | The Palestra; Philadelphia, Pennsylvania |
| Dec 14, 2004* | | Fordham | W 68–47 | 4–1 | Wachovia Center; Philadelphia, Pennsylvania |
| Dec 22, 2004* | | Albany | W 86–72 | 5–1 | Wachovia Center; Philadelphia, Pennsylvania |
| Dec 27, 2004* | | Middle Tennessee | W 81–62 | 6–1 | Wachovia Center; Philadelphia, Pennsylvania |
| Dec 31, 2004* | | Penn | W 74–64 | 7–1 | Wachovia Center; Philadelphia, Pennsylvania |
| Jan 5, 2005 | | No. 21 West Virginia | W 84–46 | 8–1 (1–0) | The Pavilion; Philadelphia, Pennsylvania |
| Jan 8, 2005 | | at Notre Dame | L 72–78 | 8–2 (1–1) | Joyce Center; Notre Dame, Indiana |
| Jan 11, 2005 | | at Providence | W 83–78 ^{OT} | 9–2 (2–1) | Dunkin' Donuts Center; Providence, Rhode Island |
| Jan 15, 2005 | | Georgetown | L 64–66 | 9–3 (2–2) | Wachovia Center; Philadelphia, Pennsylvania |
| Jan 19, 2005 | | at No. 9 Boston College | L 66–67 | 9–4 (2–3) | Silvio O. Conte Forum; Boston, Massachusetts |
| Jan 22, 2005* | | No. 2 Kansas | W 83–62 | 10–4 | Wachovia Center; Philadelphia, Pennsylvania |
| Jan 26, 2005 | | Notre Dame | W 65–60 | 11–4 (3–3) | Wachovia Center; Philadelphia, Pennsylvania |
| Jan 29, 2005 | | at Rutgers | W 94–61 | 12–4 (4–3) | Louis Brown Athletic Center; Piscataway, New Jersey |
| Feb 2, 2005 | No. 24 | at No. 23 Connecticut | L 76–81 | 12–5 (4–4) | Harry A. Gampel Pavilion; Storrs, Connecticut |
| Feb 5, 2005 | No. 24 | Providence | W 89–81 | 13–5 (5–4) | Wachovia Center; Philadelphia, Pennsylvania |
| Feb 7, 2005* | No. 24 | vs. Saint Joseph's | W 67–52 | 14–5 | The Palestra; Philadelphia, Pennsylvania |
| Feb 12, 2005 | No. 22 | No. 8 Syracuse | L 75–90 | 14–6 (5–5) | Wachovia Center; Philadelphia, Pennsylvania |
| Feb 15, 2005* | No. 22 | Bucknell | W 89–51 | 15–6 | Wachovia Center; Philadelphia, Pennsylvania |
| Feb 17, 2005 | No. 25 | at Seton Hall | W 66–52 | 16–6 (6–5) | Continental Airlines Arena; East Rutherford, New Jersey |
| Feb 20, 2005 | No. 25 | No. 17 Pittsburgh | W 80–72 | 17–6 (7–5) | Wachovia Center; Philadelphia, Pennsylvania |
| Feb 23, 2005 | No. 23 | No. 3 Boston College | W 76–70 | 18–6 (8–5) | Wachovia Center; Philadelphia, Pennsylvania |
| Feb 27, 2005 | No. 23 | at Georgetown | W 67–56 | 19–6 (9–5) | Verizon Center; Washington, D.C. |
| Mar 2, 2005 | No. 19 | Seton Hall | W 79–58 | 20–6 (10–5) | Wachovia Center; Philadelphia, Pennsylvania |
| Mar 5, 2005 | No. 19 | at St. John's | W 70–68 | 21–6 (11–5) | Madison Square Garden; New York, New York |
Big East Tournament
| Mar 10, 2005* | No. 19 | vs. No. 22 Pittsburgh | W 67–58 | 22–6 | Madison Square Garden; New York, New York |
| Mar 11, 2005* | No. 19 | vs. West Virginia | L 76–78 | 22–7 | Madison Square Garden; New York, New York |
NCAA Tournament
| Mar 18, 2005* | (5 SYR) No. 19 | vs. (12 SYR) New Mexico; First round | W 55–47 | 23–7 | Bridgestone Arena; Nashville, Tennessee |
| Mar 20, 2005* | (5 SYR) No. 19 | vs. (4 SYR) No. 16 Florida; Second Round | W 76–65 | 24–7 | Bridgestone Arena; Nashville, Tennessee |
| Mar 25, 2005* | (5 SYR) No. 19 | vs. (1 SYR) No. 2 North Carolina; Regional semifinal – Sweet Sixteen | L 66–67 | 24–8 | Carrier Dome; Syracuse, New York |
*Non-conference game. ^{#}Rankings from AP Poll. (#) Tournament seedings in parentheses. SYR=Syracuse.
