= 2005 Big East men's basketball tournament =

- Classification: Division I
- Season: 2004–05
- Teams: 11
- Site: Madison Square Garden; New York City
- Champions: Syracuse (4th title)
- Winning coach: Jim Boeheim (4th title)
- MVP: Hakim Warrick (Syracuse)
- Top scorer: Hakim Warrick (Syracuse) (69 points)

2004–05 Big East men's basketball standings
	Conf.				Overall
Team	W		L	PCT	W		L	PCT
No. 14 Boston College	13	–	3	.813	25	–	5	.833
No. 13 Connecticut	13	–	3	.813	23	–	8	.742
No. 19 Villanova	11	–	5	.688	24	–	8	.750
Pittsburgh	10	–	6	.625	20	–	9	.690
Notre Dame	9	–	7	.563	17	–	12	.586
Georgetown	8	–	8	.500	19	–	13	.594
West Virginia	8	–	8	.500	24	–	11	.686
Providence	4	–	12	.250	14	–	17	.452
Seton Hall	4	–	12	.250	12	–	16	.429
Rutgers	2	–	14	.125	10	–	19	.345
St. John's*	3	–	13	.188	9	–	18	.333
No. 11 Syracuse†**	0	–	5	.000	12	–	7	.632
† 2005 Big East tournament winner As of April 4, 2005; Rankings from AP Poll; *Not eligible for the 2005 Big East tournament due to sanctions against the program. **Syracuse had 15 regular season games vacated due to sanctions against the program; Syracuse′s disputed record was 27–7, 11–5.

The 2005 Big East Men's Basketball Championship was played from March 9 to March 12, 2005. The tournament took place at Madison Square Garden in New York City. The Syracuse Orange won the tournament and were awarded an automatic bid to the 2005 NCAA Men's Division I Basketball Tournament.

== Bracket ==
First round Wednesday, March 9
8	West Virginia	82
9	Providence	59
7	Georgetown	56
10	Seton Hall	51
6	Notre Dame	65
11	Rutgers	72

Quarterfinals; Thursday, March 10
1	#7 Boston College	72
8	West Virginia	78
4	#19 Villanova	67
5	#22 Pittsburgh	58
2	#12 Connecticut	66
7	Georgetown	62
3	#16 Syracuse	81
11	Rutgers	57

Semifinals; Friday, March 11
8	West Virginia	78
4	#19 Villanova	76
2	#12 Connecticut	63
3	#16 Syracuse	67

Final; Saturday, March 12
8	West Virginia	59
3	#16 Syracuse	68

Note: St. John's was ineligible for the tournament due to sanctions against the program.

== Games ==
- 1st round: Wednesday, March 9

Noon

Team	1	2	Total
(9) Providence	20	39	59
(8) West Virginia	35	47	82

2PM

Team	1	2	Total
(10) Seton Hall	28	23	51
(7) Georgetown	27	29	56

7PM

Team	1	2	Total
(11) Rutgers	35	37	72
(6) Notre Dame	32	33	65

- Quarterfinals: Thursday, March 10

Noon

Team	1	2	Total
(8) West Virginia	44	34	78
(1) Boston College	22	50	72

2 PM

Team	1	2	Total
(5) Pittsburgh	19	39	58
(4) Villanova	31	36	67

7 PM

Team	1	2	Total
(7) Georgetown	26	36	62
(2) Connecticut	32	34	66

9 PM

Team	1	2	Total
(11) Rutgers	22	35	57
(3) Syracuse	47	34	81

- Semifinals: Friday, March 11

7 PM

Team	1	2	Total
(8) West Virginia	42	36	78
(4) Villanova	35	41	76

9 PM

Team	1	2	Total
(3) Syracuse	32	35	67
(2) Connecticut	19	44	63

- Finals: Saturday, March 12

9 PM

Team	1	2	Total
(8) West Virginia	31	28	59
(3) Syracuse	41	27	68

== Awards ==
Dave Gavitt Trophy (Most Outstanding Player): Hakim Warrick, Syracuse

All-Tournament Team

- Gerry McNamara, Syracuse
- Josh Pace, Syracuse
- Mike Gansey, West Virginia
- Kevin Pittsnogle, West Virginia
- Randy Foye, Villanova
