= 2004–05 Syracuse Orange men's basketball team =

American college basketball season

2004–05 Syracuse Orange men's basketball

Big East Tournament champion

NCAA tournament, First round
- Conference: Big East Conference

Ranking
- Coaches: No. 21
- AP: No. 11
- Record: 12–7, 15 wins vacated (0–5 Big East, 11 wins vacated)
- Head coach: Jim Boeheim (29th season)
- Assistant coaches: Bernie Fine (29th season); Mike Hopkins (10th season); Rob Murphy (1st season)
- Home arena: Carrier Dome

2004–05 Big East men's basketball standings
	Conf.				Overall
Team	W		L	PCT	W		L	PCT
No. 14 Boston College	13	–	3	.813	25	–	5	.833
No. 13 Connecticut	13	–	3	.813	23	–	8	.742
No. 19 Villanova	11	–	5	.688	24	–	8	.750
Pittsburgh	10	–	6	.625	20	–	9	.690
Notre Dame	9	–	7	.563	17	–	12	.586
Georgetown	8	–	8	.500	19	–	13	.594
West Virginia	8	–	8	.500	24	–	11	.686
Providence	4	–	12	.250	14	–	17	.452
Seton Hall	4	–	12	.250	12	–	16	.429
Rutgers	2	–	14	.125	10	–	19	.345
St. John's*	3	–	13	.188	9	–	18	.333
No. 11 Syracuse†**	0	–	5	.000	12	–	7	.632
† 2005 Big East tournament winner As of April 4, 2005; Rankings from AP Poll; *Not eligible for the 2005 Big East tournament due to sanctions against the program. **Syracuse had 15 regular season games vacated due to sanctions against the program; Syracuse′s disputed record was 27–7, 11–5.

The 2004–05 Syracuse Orange men's basketball team represented Syracuse University in the 2004–05 NCAA Division I season. This was the first season in which Syracuse used its current nickname of "Orange"; previously, Syracuse teams had been known as "Orangemen" and "Orangewomen", depending on sex. The head coach was Jim Boeheim, serving for his 29th year. The team played its home games at the Carrier Dome in Syracuse, New York. The team finished with a 27–7 (11–5) record, while making it to the first round of the NCAA tournament. The team was led by senior Hakim Warrick and junior Gerry McNamara. Seniors Josh Pace and Craig Forth were also major contributors.

Due to NCAA sanctions for use of ineligible players, 15 wins from this season have been vacated.

== Roster ==
- Hakim Warrick (21.4 ppg, 8.7 rpg)
- Gerry McNamara (15.8 ppg, 4.9 apg)
- Josh Pace (10.8 ppg, 5.0 rpg)
- Terrence Roberts (7.2 ppg, 3.9 rpg)
- Louie McCroskey (5.6 ppg, 2.9 rpg)
- Craig Forth (4.7 ppg, 5.1 rpg)
- Demetris Nichols (3.9 ppg, 2.1 rpg)
- Darryl Watkins (3.7 ppg, 3.4 rpg)

== Developments ==
- No. 4 seed Syracuse was upset by No. 13 seed Vermont in the first round of the NCAA tournament. It marked the first time a Boeheim-coached team had been knocked out in the first round since the 1998–1999 season.
- Syracuse captured its first Big East title since 1992 as it beat Rutgers, Connecticut and West Virginia along the way. Warrick averaged better than 22 points in those three games and was named the Big East Conference Championship MVP and Big East Player of the Year.
- Billy Edelin played just 20 games and left the team for undisclosed reasons after the team's Feb. 19 game against Boston College. Edelin would never play another game for Syracuse.
- Syracuse captured the 2004 Coaches vs. Cancer Classic as then-No. 6 Syracuse defeated then-No. 24 Memphis, 77–62, at Madison Square Garden.
- Syracuse started the season ranked No. 6 in the country.
