= 2004–05 St. John's Red Storm men's basketball team =

American college basketball season

2004–05 St. John's Red Storm men's basketball

MSG Holiday Festival Champions
- Conference: Big East Conference (1979–2013)
- Record: 9–18 (3–13 Big East)
- Head coach: Norm Roberts (1st year)
- Assistant coaches: Glenn Braica; Chuck Martin; Fred Quartlebaum
- Home arena: Carnesecca Arena; Madison Square Garden

2004–05 Big East men's basketball standings
| | Conf. | | | | Overall |
| Team | W | | L | PCT | W | | L | PCT |
|---|---|---|---|---|---|---|---|---|
| No. 14 Boston College | 13 | – | 3 | .813 | 25 | – | 5 | .833 |
| No. 13 Connecticut | 13 | – | 3 | .813 | 23 | – | 8 | .742 |
| No. 19 Villanova | 11 | – | 5 | .688 | 24 | – | 8 | .750 |
| Pittsburgh | 10 | – | 6 | .625 | 20 | – | 9 | .690 |
| Notre Dame | 9 | – | 7 | .563 | 17 | – | 12 | .586 |
| Georgetown | 8 | – | 8 | .500 | 19 | – | 13 | .594 |
| West Virginia | 8 | – | 8 | .500 | 24 | – | 11 | .686 |
| Providence | 4 | – | 12 | .250 | 14 | – | 17 | .452 |
| Seton Hall | 4 | – | 12 | .250 | 12 | – | 16 | .429 |
| Rutgers | 2 | – | 14 | .125 | 10 | – | 19 | .345 |
| St. John's* | 3 | – | 13 | .188 | 9 | – | 18 | .333 |
| No. 11 Syracuse†** | 0 | – | 5 | .000 | 12 | – | 7 | .632 |
† 2005 Big East tournament winner As of April 4, 2005; Rankings from AP Poll; *Not eligible for the 2005 Big East tournament due to sanctions against the program. **Syracuse had 15 regular season games vacated due to sanctions against the program; Syracuse′s disputed record was 27–7, 11–5.

The 2004–05 St. John's Red Storm men's basketball team represented St. John's University during the 2004–05 NCAA Division I men's basketball season. The team was coached by Norm Roberts in his first year at the school replacing interim head coach Kevin Clark. St. John's home games are played at Carnesecca Arena and Madison Square Garden and the team is a member of the Big East Conference.

== Off season ==
=== Departures ===
| Name | Number | Pos. | Height | Weight | Year | Hometown | Notes |
|---|---|---|---|---|---|---|---|
| Joe McDonald | 2 | G | 5'11" | 185 | Senior | Farmingdale, New York | Graduated |
| Elijah Ingram | 12 | PG | 6'0" | 170 | Sophomore | Jersey City, New Jersey | Transferred to New Mexico State |
| Kyle Cuffe | 25 | PF | 6'9" | 236 | Senior | Bronx, New York | Graduated |
| Curtis Johnson | 52 | C | 7'3" | 320 | Senior | Norfolk, Virginia | Graduated |

=== Class of 2004 signees ===
College recruiting information
| Name | Hometown | School | Height | Weight | Commit date |
|---|---|---|---|---|---|
| Cedric Jackson; SG | Columbus, NJ | Northern Burlington High School | 6 ft 1 in (1.85 m) | 180 lb (82 kg) | |
| Cedric Jackson; SG | Recruit ratings: Scout: Rivals: 247Sports: | | | | |
| Eugene Lawrence; PG | Brooklyn, NY | Lincoln High School | 6 ft 1 in (1.85 m) | 210 lb (95 kg) | |
| Eugene Lawrence; PG | Recruit ratings: Scout: 247Sports: | | | | |
| Dexter Gray; PF | Mount Vernon, NY | Mount Vernon High School | 6 ft 6 in (1.98 m) | 220 lb (100 kg) | May 12, 2004 |
| Dexter Gray; PF | Recruit ratings: Scout: 247Sports: | | | | |
Overall recruit ranking:
Note: In many cases, Scout, Rivals, 247Sports, On3, and ESPN may conflict in their listings of height and weight.; In these cases, the average was taken. ESPN grades are on a 100-point scale.; Sources: "2004 Team Ranking". Rivals.

=== Transfer additions ===
| Name | Pos. | Height | Weight | Year | Hometown | Notes |
|---|---|---|---|---|---|---|
| Rodney Epperson | F | 6'7" | 200 | Senior | Queens, New York | junior college transfer from Midland College (1 yr immediate eligibility) |
| Ryan Williams | G/F | 6'5" | 225 | Junior | Queens, New York | junior college transfer from Monroe College (2 yrs immediate eligibility) |
| Jermaine Maybank | G | 6'4" | 180 | Junior | Bronx, New York | junior college transfer from Independence Community College (2 yrs immediate eligibility) |

== Roster ==
2004–05 St. John's Red Storm men's basketball team
Players
Coaches

| Pos. | # | Name | Height | Weight | Year | Previous school | Hometown |
|---|---|---|---|---|---|---|---|
| G | 0 | Nygel Roach (W) | 6 ft 3 in (1.91 m) | 195 lb (88 kg) | Jr | Xavier | North Bergen, NJ |
| F | 1 | Tyler Jones | 6 ft 9 in (2.06 m) | 210 lb (95 kg) | So | Heritage Christian | Denver, CO |
| F | 2 | Rodney Epperson | 6 ft 7 in (2.01 m) | 200 lb (91 kg) | Jr | La Salle/Midland | Flushing, NY |
| G | 3 | Daryll Hill (C) | 6 ft 3 in (1.91 m) | 170 lb (77 kg) | RS So | Milford Academy | Bayside, NY |
| G | 4 | Eugene Lawrence | 6 ft 1 in (1.85 m) | 210 lb (95 kg) | Fr | Abraham Lincoln | Brooklyn, NY |
| G | 5 | Devin Mayo (W) | 6 ft 0 in (1.83 m) | 158 lb (72 kg) | So | Clinton Christian | Upper Marlboro, MD |
| G | 10 | Jermaine Maybank (injured) (redshirt) | 6 ft 4 in (1.93 m) | 180 lb (82 kg) | Jr | Independence C.C. | Bronx, NY |
| G | 11 | Cedric Jackson | 6 ft 1 in (1.85 m) | 180 lb (82 kg) | Fr | Northern Burlington | McGuire, NJ |
| F | 15 | Phil Missere | 6 ft 9 in (2.06 m) | 206 lb (93 kg) | Sr | Cornwall Central | Cornwall, NY |
| F | 23 | Ryan Williams | 6 ft 5 in (1.96 m) | 225 lb (102 kg) | Jr | Cardozo/Monroe | Queens, NY |
| F | 24 | Dexter Gray | 6 ft 6 in (1.98 m) | 220 lb (100 kg) | Fr | Mount Vernon | Mount Vernon, NY |
| F | 33 | Otoja Abit (W) | 6 ft 6 in (1.98 m) | 195 lb (88 kg) | Fr | Archbishop Molloy | Woodside, NY |
| F/C | 34 | Lamont Hamilton (C) | 6 ft 10 in (2.08 m) | 225 lb (102 kg) | So | Bridgton Academy | Brooklyn, NY |
| C | 44 | Mohamed Diakite | 6 ft 11 in (2.11 m) | 210 lb (95 kg) | RS Sr | Montrose Christian | Rockville, MD |

Head coach

- Norm Roberts (Queens College)

Assistant coach(es)

- Glenn Braica
- Chuck Martin
- Fred Quartlebaum

Legend

- (C) Team captain
- (S) Suspended
- (I) Ineligible
- (W) Walk-on
- Injured
- Current redshirt

== Schedule and results ==
| Date time, TV | Rank^{#} | Opponent^{#} | Result | Record | Site (attendance) city, state |
Exhibition
| 11/14/04*; 7:00pm | | Concordia | W 85–77 | | Alumni Hall (2,991); Queens, NY |
Regular Season
| 11/20/04*; 2:00pm, ESPN Radio | | Wagner | W 79–68 | 1–0 | Alumni Hall (3,592); Queens, NY |
| 11/23/04*; 7:30pm, ESPN Radio | | St. Francis (N.Y.) | L 52–53 | 1–1 | Alumni Hall (5,149); Queens, NY |
| 11/27/04*; 7:00pm, ESPN Radio | | at Niagara | L 81–102 | 1–2 | Gallagher Center (2,400); Niagara, NY |
| 11/30/04*; 7:30pm, ESPN Radio | | Stony Brook | W 66–57 | 2–2 | Alumni Hall (3,585); Queens, NY |
| 12/04/04*; 8:05pm, ESPN Radio | | at Illinois State | L 69–77 | 2–3 | Redbird Arena (9,044); Normal, IL |
| 12/08/04*; 7:30pm, Radio Disney | | Virginia Tech | W 75–65 | 3–3 | Alumni Hall (3,419); Queens, NY |
| 12/11/04*; 4:00pm, ESPN Radio | | at Hofstra | L 68–78 | 3–4 | Hofstra Arena (5,124); Hempstead, NY |
| 12/19/04*; 2:00pm, Radio Disney | | Marist | W 74–66 | 4–4 | Alumni Hall (3,282); Queens, NY |
| 12/28/04*; 8:30pm, ESPN Radio | | vs. Canisius; Dreyfus Holiday Festival Opening Round | W 71–51 | 5–4 | Madison Square Garden (8,731); New York, NY |
| 12/30/04*; 8:30pm, ESPN Radio | | vs. No. 17 N.C. State; Dreyfus Holiday Festival Championship | W 63–45 | 6–4 | Madison Square Garden (8,962); New York, NY |
| 01/05/05; 7:30pm, FSNY | | No. 6 Syracuse | L 65–79 | 6–5 (0–1) | Madison Square Garden (9,596); New York, NY |
| 01/08/05; 2:00pm, MSG | | at No. 21 West Virginia | L 60–64 | 6–6 (0–2) | WVU Coliseum (9,536); Morgantown, WV |
| 01/15/05; 2:00pm, Metro | | at Notre Dame | L 66–67 | 6–7 (0–3) | Joyce Convocation Center (11,418); Notre Dame, IN |
| 01/18/05; 7:30pm, MSG | | No. 21 Pittsburgh | W 65–62 | 7–7 (1–3) | Madison Square Garden (5,084); New York, NY |
| 01/22/05; 7:30pm, MSG | | No. 9 Boston College | L 73–79 | 7–8 (1–4) | Carnesecca Arena (4,679); Queens, NY |
| 01/25/05; 7:30pm, Metro | | at Georgetown | L 57–66 | 7–9 (1–5) | MCI Center (7,864); Washington, D.C. |
| 01/29/05; 2:00pm, MSG | | Seton Hall | L 55–62 | 7–10 (1–6) | Madison Square Garden (6,665); New York, NY |
| 02/02/05; 7:00pm, MSG | | Rutgers | W 53–52 | 8–10 (2–6) | Madison Square Garden (5,775); New York, NY |
| 02/05/05; 12:00pm, MSG | | at No. 23 Connecticut | L 46–68 | 8–11 (2–7) | Hartford Civic Center (10,167); Storrs, CT |
| 02/08/05; 7:00pm, Metro | | at No. 18 Pittsburgh | L 44–55 | 8–12 (2–8) | Petersen Events Center (11,034); Pittsburgh, PA |
| 02/12/05; 7:30pm, MSG | | at Seton Hall | L 55–57 | 8–13 (2–9) | Izod Center (9,293); East Rutherford, NJ |
| 02/16/05; 7:30pm, FSNY | | West Virginia | L 66–67 | 8–14 (2–10) | Carnesecca Arena (3,943); Queens, NY |
| 02/20/05; 2:00pm, ESPN Radio | | Georgetown | W 76–67 | 9–14 (3–10) | Madison Square Garden (7,464); New York, NY |
| 02/23/05; 7:00pm, MSG | | at No. 15 Syracuse | L 69–83 | 9–15 (3–11) | Carrier Dome (23,579); Syracuse, NY |
| 02/26/05; 1:00pm, ABC | | No. 7 Duke | L 47–58 | 9–16 (3–11) | Madison Square Garden (16,290); New York, NY |
| 03/01/05; 7:30pm, MSG | | at Providence | L 75–86 | 9–17 (3–12) | Dunkin Donuts Center (8,792); Providence, RI |
| 03/05/05; 2:00pm, MSG | | No. 19 Villanova | L 68–70 | 9–18 (3–13) | Madison Square Garden (8,894); New York, NY |
*Non-conference game. ^{#}Rankings from AP Poll. (#) Tournament seedings in parentheses.
