= 2004–05 Pittsburgh Panthers men's basketball team =

American college basketball season

2004–05 Pittsburgh Panthers men's basketball

NCAA tournament, first round, L 71–79 vs. Pacific
- Conference: Big East Conference (1979–2013)
- Record: 20–9 (10–6 Big East)
- Head coach: Jamie Dixon (2nd season)
- Assistant coaches: Joe Lombardi (2nd season); Barry Rohrssen (4th season); Pat Sandle (4th season)
- Home arena: Petersen Events Center (Capacity: 12,508)

2004–05 Big East men's basketball standings
	Conf.				Overall
Team	W		L	PCT	W		L	PCT
No. 14 Boston College	13	–	3	.813	25	–	5	.833
No. 13 Connecticut	13	–	3	.813	23	–	8	.742
No. 19 Villanova	11	–	5	.688	24	–	8	.750
Pittsburgh	10	–	6	.625	20	–	9	.690
Notre Dame	9	–	7	.563	17	–	12	.586
Georgetown	8	–	8	.500	19	–	13	.594
West Virginia	8	–	8	.500	24	–	11	.686
Providence	4	–	12	.250	14	–	17	.452
Seton Hall	4	–	12	.250	12	–	16	.429
Rutgers	2	–	14	.125	10	–	19	.345
St. John's*	3	–	13	.188	9	–	18	.333
No. 11 Syracuse†**	0	–	5	.000	12	–	7	.632
† 2005 Big East tournament winner As of April 4, 2005; Rankings from AP Poll; *Not eligible for the 2005 Big East tournament due to sanctions against the program. **Syracuse had 15 regular season games vacated due to sanctions against the program; Syracuse′s disputed record was 27–7, 11–5.

The 2004–05 Pittsburgh Panthers men's basketball team represented the University of Pittsburgh in the 2004–05 NCAA Division I men's basketball season. Led by head coach Jamie Dixon, the Panthers finished with a record of 20–9 and lost in the first round of the 2005 NCAA Division I men's basketball tournament where they lost to Pacific.

== Schedule ==
Date time, TV	Rank^{#}	Opponent^{#}	Result	Record	Site city, state
November 20*	No. 17	Howard	W 81–55	1–0	Petersen Events Center; Pittsburgh, PA
November 24*	No. 16	Robert Morris	W 83–59	2–0	Petersen Events Center; Pittsburgh, PA
November 27*	No. 16	Loyola (MD)	W 93–57	3–0	Petersen Events Center; Pittsburgh, PA
December 1*	No. 13	St. Francis (PA)	W 65–41	4–0	Petersen Events Center; Pittsburgh, PA
December 4*	No. 13	Duquesne	W 87–57	5–0	Petersen Events Center; Pittsburgh, PA
December 7*	No. 11	vs. Memphis; Jimmy V Classic	W 70–51	6–0	Madison Square Garden; New York, NY
December 11*	No. 11	at Penn State	W 84–71	7–0	Bryce Jordan Center; University Park, PA
December 18*	No. 10	Coppin State	W 73–42	8–0	Petersen Events Center; Pittsburgh, PA
December 23*	No. 10	Richmond	W 69–60	9–0	Petersen Events Center; Pittsburgh, PA
December 29*	No. 10	South Carolina	W 72–68	10–0	Petersen Events Center; Pittsburgh, PA
January 2*	No. 10	Bucknell	L 66–69	10–1	Petersen Events Center; Pittsburgh, PA
January 5	No. 16	Georgetown	L 64–67	10–2 (0–1)	Petersen Events Center; Pittsburgh, PA
January 8	No. 16	at Rutgers	W 66–63 ^{OT}	11–2 (1–1)	Louis Brown Athletic Center; Piscataway, NJ
January 15	No. 20	Seton Hall	W 67–63	12–2 (2–1)	Petersen Events Center; Pittsburgh, PA
January 18	No. 21	at St. John's	L 62–65	12–3 (2–2)	Madison Square Garden; New York, NY
January 22	No. 21	at No. 16 Connecticut; College GameDay	W 76–66	13–3 (3–2)	Harry A. Gampel Pavilion; Storrs, CT
January 29	No. 20	No. 4 Syracuse	W 76–69	14–3 (4–2)	Petersen Events Center; Pittsburgh, PA
January 31	No. 20	Providence	W 86–66	15–3 (5–2)	Petersen Events Center; Pittsburgh, PA
February 5	No. 16	at West Virginia	L 78–83 ^{OT}	15–4 (5–3)	WVU Coliseum; Morgantown, WV
February 8	No. 18	St. John's	W 55–44	16–4 (6–3)	Petersen Events Center; Pittsburgh, PA
February 12	No. 18	Notre Dame	W 68–66	17–4 (7–3)	Petersen Events Center; Pittsburgh, PA
February 14	No. 18	at No. 8 Syracuse	W 68–64	18–4 (8–3)	Carrier Dome; Syracuse, NY
February 20	No. 17	at No. 25 Villanova	L 72–80	18–5 (8–4)	The Pavilion; Villanova, PA
February 23	No. 18	West Virginia	L 66–70	18–6 (8–5)	Petersen Events Center; Pittsburgh, PA
February 26	No. 18	No. 17 Connecticut	L 64–73	18–7 (8–6)	Petersen Events Center; Pittsburgh, PA
February 28	No. 18	at No. 3 Boston College	W 72–50	19–7 (9–6)	Silvio O. Conte Forum; Chestnut Hill, MA
March 5	No. 24	at Notre Dame	W 85–77	20–7 (10–6)	Joyce Center; South Bend, IN
March 10*	No. 22 (5)	vs. No. 19 (4) Villanova; Big East tournament	L 58–67	20–8	Madison Square Garden; New York, NY
March 17*	(9)	vs. (8) No. 22 Pacific; NCAA tournament	L 71–79	20–9	Taco Bell Arena; Boise, ID
*Non-conference game. ^{#}Rankings from AP Poll. (#) Tournament seedings in parentheses. All times are in Eastern Standard Time.

== Roster ==
2004–05 Pittsburgh Panthers men's basketball team
Players
Coaches

Pos.	#	Name	Height	Weight	Year	Previous school	Hometown
G	13	Keith Benjamin	6 ft 2 in (1.88 m)	190 lb (86 kg)	Fr	Mount Vernon	Mount Vernon, NY
G	24	Marcus Bowman (redshirt)	6 ft 3 in (1.91 m)	185 lb (84 kg)	So	Richland Northeast	Columbia, SC
G	3	Yuri Demetris (redshirt)	6 ft 4 in (1.93 m)	220 lb (100 kg)	Sr	Shaler Area	Glenshaw, PA
F	0	John DeGroat	6 ft 6 in (1.98 m)	220 lb (100 kg)	Jr	Monticello	Newburgh, NY
G	22	Antonio Graves	6 ft 3 in (1.91 m)	190 lb (86 kg)	So	Mansfield Senior	Mansfield, OH
C	33	Aaron Gray	7 ft 0 in (2.13 m)	275 lb (125 kg)	So	Emmaus	Emmaus, PA
F	14	Levon Kendall (redshirt)	6 ft 9 in (2.06 m)	220 lb (100 kg)	So	Kitsilano	Vancouver, British Columbia
G	11	Carl Krauser (redshirt)	6 ft 2 in (1.88 m)	200 lb (91 kg)	Jr	Notre Dame Academy	Bronx, NY
F	21	Mark McCarroll (redshirt)	6 ft 10 in (2.08 m)	220 lb (100 kg)	Sr	Christ the King	Queens, NY
F	20	Dante Milligan (redshirt)	6 ft 8 in (2.03 m)	200 lb (91 kg)	Fr	Trinity-Pawling	New York, NY
G	4	Ronald Ramón	6 ft 1 in (1.85 m)	180 lb (82 kg)	Fr	All Hallows	Bronx, NY
G	15	Charles Small (redshirt)	5 ft 7 in (1.7 m)	175 lb (79 kg)	So	Martin Luther King	Detroit, MI
F	23	Chris Taft	6 ft 10 in (2.08 m)	260 lb (118 kg)	So	Xaverian	Brooklyn, NY
F	2	Chevon Troutman (redshirt)	6 ft 7 in (2.01 m)	240 lb (109 kg)	Sr	Williamsport Area	Williamsport, PA

Head coach

- Jamie Dixon

Assistant coach(es)

- Joe Lombardi
- Barry Rohrssen
- Pat Sandle

Legend

- (C) Team captain
- (S) Suspended
- (I) Ineligible
- (W) Walk-on
- Injured
- Current redshirt

Roster
Last update: 2015-12-20
