= 2004–05 West Virginia Mountaineers men's basketball team =

American college basketball season

2004–05 West Virginia Mountaineers men's basketball

NCAA tournament, Elite Eight
- Conference: Big East Conference

Ranking
- Coaches: No. 12
- Record: 24–11 (8–8 Big East)
- Head coach: John Beilein (3rd season)
- Assistant coach: Jerry Dunn
- Home arena: WVU Coliseum

2004–05 Big East men's basketball standings
| | Conf. | | | | Overall |
| Team | W | | L | PCT | W | | L | PCT |
|---|---|---|---|---|---|---|---|---|
| No. 14 Boston College | 13 | – | 3 | .813 | 25 | – | 5 | .833 |
| No. 13 Connecticut | 13 | – | 3 | .813 | 23 | – | 8 | .742 |
| No. 19 Villanova | 11 | – | 5 | .688 | 24 | – | 8 | .750 |
| Pittsburgh | 10 | – | 6 | .625 | 20 | – | 9 | .690 |
| Notre Dame | 9 | – | 7 | .563 | 17 | – | 12 | .586 |
| Georgetown | 8 | – | 8 | .500 | 19 | – | 13 | .594 |
| West Virginia | 8 | – | 8 | .500 | 24 | – | 11 | .686 |
| Providence | 4 | – | 12 | .250 | 14 | – | 17 | .452 |
| Seton Hall | 4 | – | 12 | .250 | 12 | – | 16 | .429 |
| Rutgers | 2 | – | 14 | .125 | 10 | – | 19 | .345 |
| St. John's* | 3 | – | 13 | .188 | 9 | – | 18 | .333 |
| No. 11 Syracuse†** | 0 | – | 5 | .000 | 12 | – | 7 | .632 |
† 2005 Big East tournament winner As of April 4, 2005; Rankings from AP Poll; *Not eligible for the 2005 Big East tournament due to sanctions against the program. **Syracuse had 15 regular season games vacated due to sanctions against the program; Syracuse′s disputed record was 27–7, 11–5.

The 2004–05 West Virginia Mountaineers men's basketball team represented West Virginia University from Morgantown, West Virginia during the 2004-05 season. The team was led by head coach John Beilein and played their home games at WVU Coliseum.

After losing in the championship game of the Big East tournament, the Mountaineers would gain an at-large bid to the NCAA tournament, where they would make a run to the Elite Eight. In the Round of 32, junior guard Mike Gansey led the team to a double overtime victory over #2 seeded Wake Forest and future NBA star Chris Paul with 29 points scored. The team finished with a 24–11 record (8–8 Big East).

== Roster ==
2004–05 West Virginia Mountaineers men's basketball team
Players
Coaches

| Pos. | # | Name | Height | Weight | Year | Previous school | Hometown |
|---|---|---|---|---|---|---|---|
| G | 1 | J. D. Collins | 5 ft 10 in (1.78 m) | 180 lb (82 kg) | Jr | | Houston, Texas |
| F | 3 | Patrick Beilein | 6 ft 4 in (1.93 m) | 205 lb (93 kg) | Jr | Benedictine | Richmond, Virginia |
| F | 4 | Tyrone Sally | 6 ft 7 in (2.01 m) | 210 lb (95 kg) | Sr | Meadowbrook | Chesterfield, Virginia |
| G | 5 | Johannes Herber | 6 ft 5 in (1.96 m) | 210 lb (95 kg) | Jr | | Darmstadt, West Germany |
| G | 20 | Mike Gansey | 6 ft 4 in (1.93 m) | 185 lb (84 kg) | Jr | St. Bonaventure | Olmsted Falls, Ohio |
| C | 34 | Kevin Pittsnogle | 6 ft 11 in (2.11 m) | 245 lb (111 kg) | Jr | Martinsburg | Martinsburg, West Virginia |
| F/C | 40 | D'or Fischer | 6 ft 11 in (2.11 m) | 250 lb (113 kg) | Sr | Northwestern State | Drexel Hill, Pennsylvania |

Head coach

- John Beilein

Assistant coach(es)

- Jerry Dunn

Legend

- (C) Team captain
- (S) Suspended
- (I) Ineligible
- (W) Walk-on
- Injured
- Current redshirt

== Schedule and results ==
| Date time, TV | Rank^{#} | Opponent^{#} | Result | Record | Site city, state |
Regular season
| Nov 20, 2004* | | Saint Peter's | W 82–70 | 1–0 | WVU Coliseum; Morgantown, West Virginia |
| Nov 24, 2004* | | at Duquesne | W 72–69 | 2–0 | A.J. Palumbo Center; Pittsburgh, Pennsylvania |
| Nov 27, 2004* | | at Louisiana State | W 84–69 | 3–0 | Maravich Assembly Center; Baton Rouge, Louisiana |
| Dec 4, 2004* | | Radford | W 78–44 | 4–0 | WVU Coliseum; Morgantown, West Virginia |
| Dec 7, 2004* | | vs. St. Bonaventure | W 70–55 | 5–0 | Charleston Civic Center; Charleston, West Virginia |
| Dec 11, 2004* | | Coppin State | W 71–47 | 6–0 | WVU Coliseum; Morgantown, West Virginia |
| Dec 18, 2004* | | James Madison | W 77–48 | 7–0 | WVU Coliseum; Morgantown, West Virginia |
| Dec 21, 2004* | | New Hampshire | W 82–48 | 8–0 | WVU Coliseum; Morgantown, West Virginia |
| Dec 29, 2004* | | No. 20 George Washington | W 71–65 | 9–0 | WVU Coliseum; Morgantown, West Virginia |
| Jan 2, 2005* | | at No. 17 NC State | W 82–69 | 10–0 | RBC Center; Raleigh, North Carolina |
| Jan 5, 2005 | No. 21 | at Villanova | L 46–84 | 10–1 (0–1) | The Pavilion; Philadelphia, Pennsylvania |
| Jan 8, 2005 | No. 21 | St. John's | W 64–60 | 11–1 (1–1) | WVU Coliseum; Morgantown, West Virginia |
| Jan 11, 2005* | | vs. Marshall | L 55–59 | 11–2 | Charleston Civic Center; Charleston, West Virginia |
| Jan 16, 2005 | | No. 13 Boston College | L 53–73 | 11–3 (1–2) | WVU Coliseum; Morgantown, West Virginia |
| Jan 19, 2005 | | Notre Dame | L 57–70 | 11–4 (1–3) | WVU Coliseum; Morgantown, West Virginia |
| Jan 22, 2005 | | at No. 7 Syracuse | L 64–72 | 11–5 (1–4) | Carrier Dome; Syracuse, New York |
| Jan 25, 2005 | | No. 19 Connecticut | L 58–68 | 11–6 (1–5) | WVU Coliseum; Morgantown, West Virginia |
| Jan 29, 2005 | | at Providence | W 82–78 | 12–6 (2–5) | Dunkin' Donuts Center; Providence, Rhode Island |
| Feb 1, 2005 | | at No. 5 Boston College | L 50–62 | 12–7 (2–6) | Silvio O. Conte Forum; Boston, Massachusetts |
| Feb 5, 2005 | | No. 16 Pittsburgh | W 83–78 ^{OT} | 13–7 (3–6) | WVU Coliseum; Morgantown, West Virginia |
| Feb 9, 2005 | | Providence | W 67–65 | 14–7 (4–6) | WVU Coliseum; Morgantown, West Virginia |
| Feb 12, 2005 | | at Georgetown | L 60–67 | 14–8 (4–7) | Verizon Center; Washington, D.C. |
| Feb 16, 2005 | | at St. John's | W 67–66 | 15–8 (5–7) | Carnesecca Arena; New York, New York |
| Feb 20, 2005 | | Seton Hall | W 96–86 | 16–8 (6–7) | WVU Coliseum; Morgantown, West Virginia |
| Feb 23, 2005 | | at No. 18 Pittsburgh | W 70–66 | 17–8 (7–7) | Petersen Events Center; Pittsburgh, Pennsylvania |
| Feb 26, 2005 | | Rutgers | W 76–58 | 18–8 (8–7) | WVU Coliseum; Morgantown, West Virginia |
| Mar 5, 2005 | | at Seton Hall | L 63–66 | 18–9 (8–8) | Continental Airlines Arena; East Rutherford, New Jersey |
Big East tournament
| Mar 9, 2005* | (8) | vs. (9) Providence; First round | W 82–59 | 19–9 | Madison Square Garden; New York, New York |
| Mar 10, 2005* | (8) | vs. (1) No. 7 Boston College; Quarterfinals | W 78–72 | 20–9 | Madison Square Garden; New York, New York |
| Mar 11, 2005* | (8) | vs. (4) No. 19 Villanova; Semifinals | W 78–76 | 21–9 | Madison Square Garden; New York, New York |
| Mar 12, 2005* | (8) | vs. (3) No. 16 Syracuse; Championship game | L 59–68 | 21–10 | Madison Square Garden; New York, New York |
NCAA Tournament
| Mar 17, 2005* | (7 A) | vs. (10 A) Creighton; First Round | W 63–61 | 22–10 | Wolstein Center; Cleveland, Ohio |
| Mar 19, 2005* | (7 A) | vs. (2 A) No. 5 Wake Forest; Second Round | W 111–105 ^{2OT} | 23–10 | Wolstein Center; Cleveland, Ohio |
| Mar 24, 2005* | (7 A) | vs. (6 A) No. 24 Texas Tech | W 65–60 | 24–10 | The Pit; Albuquerque, New Mexico |
| Mar 26, 2005* | (7 A) | vs. (4 A) No. 4 Louisville | L 85–93 ^{OT} | 24–11 | The Pit; Albuquerque, New Mexico |
*Non-conference game. ^{#}Rankings from AP poll. (#) Tournament seedings in parentheses. A=Albuquerque.
