= 2004–05 Connecticut Huskies men's basketball team =

American college basketball season

2004–05 Connecticut Huskies men's basketball

Big East regular season co-champions

NCAA tournament, Round of 32
- Conference: Big East Conference

Ranking
- Coaches: No. 17
- AP: No. 13
- Record: 23–8 (13–3 Big East)
- Head coach: Jim Calhoun (19th season)
- Assistant coaches: George Blaney; Andre LaFleur; Tom Moore
- Home arena: Gampel Pavilion; Hartford Civic Center

2004–05 Big East men's basketball standings
	Conf.				Overall
Team	W		L	PCT	W		L	PCT
No. 14 Boston College	13	–	3	.813	25	–	5	.833
No. 13 Connecticut	13	–	3	.813	23	–	8	.742
No. 19 Villanova	11	–	5	.688	24	–	8	.750
Pittsburgh	10	–	6	.625	20	–	9	.690
Notre Dame	9	–	7	.563	17	–	12	.586
Georgetown	8	–	8	.500	19	–	13	.594
West Virginia	8	–	8	.500	24	–	11	.686
Providence	4	–	12	.250	14	–	17	.452
Seton Hall	4	–	12	.250	12	–	16	.429
Rutgers	2	–	14	.125	10	–	19	.345
St. John's*	3	–	13	.188	9	–	18	.333
No. 11 Syracuse†**	0	–	5	.000	12	–	7	.632
† 2005 Big East tournament winner As of April 4, 2005; Rankings from AP Poll; *Not eligible for the 2005 Big East tournament due to sanctions against the program. **Syracuse had 15 regular season games vacated due to sanctions against the program; Syracuse′s disputed record was 27–7, 11–5.

The 2004–05 Connecticut Huskies men's basketball team represented the University of Connecticut in the 2004–05 collegiate men's basketball season. The Huskies completed the season with a 23–8 overall record. The Huskies were members of the Big East Conference where they finished with a 13–3 record and were the regular season co-champions. Connecticut advanced to the Second Round of the 2005 NCAA Division I men's basketball tournament before losing to North Carolina St. 65–62.

The Huskies played their home games at Harry A. Gampel Pavilion in Storrs, Connecticut and the Hartford Civic Center in Hartford, Connecticut, and they were led by nineteenth-year head coach Jim Calhoun.

== Roster ==
Listed are the student athletes who were members of the 2004–2005 team.

Name	Position	Year
Sami Ameziane	G	FR
Rashad Anderson	G	JR
Hilton Armstrong	C	JR
Jason Baisch	F	SR
Josh Boone	C	SO
Denham Brown	F	JR
Nick Forostoski	F	FR
Rudy Gay	F	FR
Antonio Kellogg	G	FR
Ed Nelson	F	JR
Ryan Thompson	F	JR
Charlie Villanueva	F	SO
Marcus White	F	SO
Marcus Williams	G	SO

== Schedule ==
Date time, TV	Rank^{#}	Opponent^{#}	Result	Record	Site (attendance) city, state
Exhibition Games
November 4*		Bridgeport	W 97–64		Gampel Pavilion; Storrs, CT
November 11*		Bryant	W 90–65		Hartford Civic Center (15,542); Hartford, CT
Regular season
November 20*; 7:00 p.m., WTXX	No. 8	Buffalo	W 90–68	1–0	Gampel Pavilion (10,167); Storrs, CT
November 30*; 7:30 p.m., WTXX	No. 7	Florida International	W 99–48	2–0	Gampel Pavilion (10,167); Storrs, CT
December 4*; 12:00 p.m., CBS	No. 7	Indiana	W 74–69	3–0	Hartford Civic Center (16,294); Hartford, CT
December 6*; 7:30 p.m., WTIC	No. 7	Northeastern	W 97–60	4–0	Gampel Pavilion (10,167); Storrs, CT
December 9*; 9:00 p.m., ESPN2	No. 7	at UMass	L 59–61	4–1	Mullins Center (9,037); Amherst, MA
December 19*; 2:00 p.m., WTXX	No. 11	Rice	W 81–72	5–1	Hartford Civic Center (16,294); Hartford, CT
December 22*; 7:00 p.m., WTIC	No. 11	Central Connecticut	W 87–59	6–1	Hartford Civic Center (16,294); Hartford, CT
December 28*; 7:00 p.m.	No. 11	Sacred Heart	W 73–55	7–1	Hartford Civic Center (16,294); Hartford, CT
December 30*; 7:00 p.m., WTIC	No. 11	Quinnipiac	W 123–71	8–1	Hartford Civic Center (16,294); Hartford, CT
January 5; 7:00 p.m., WTIC	No. 10	No. 25 Boston College	L 70–75	8–2 (0–1)	Hartford Civic Center (16,294); Hartford, CT
January 8; 12:00 p.m., WTIC	No. 10	at Georgetown; Rivalry	W 66–59	9–2 (1–1)	Verizon Center (11,363); Washington, D.C.
January 10*; 9:00 p.m., ESPN	No. 12	at No. 25 Oklahoma	L 65–77	9–3	Lloyd Noble Center (12,066); Norman, OK
January 15; 2:00 p.m., WTXX	No. 12	Rutgers	W 77–64	10–3 (2–1)	Hartford Civic Center (16,294); Hartford, CT
January 17; 7:00 p.m., ESPN	No. 16	at Seton Hall	W 77–68	11–3 (3–1)	Continental Airlines Arena (9,429); East Rutherford, NJ
January 22; 9:00 p.m., ESPN	No. 16	No. 21 Pittsburgh; College GameDay	L 66–76	11–4 (3–2)	Gampel Pavilion (10,167); Storrs, CT
January 25; 7:00 p.m., WTXX	No. 19	at West Virginia	W 68–58	12–4 (4–2)	WVU Coliseum (7,713); Morgantown, WV
January 30; 3:45 p.m., CBS	No. 19	at Notre Dame	L 74–78	12–5 (4–3)	Joyce Center (11,418); South Bend, IN
February 2; 7:00 p.m., WTIC	No. 23	No. 24 Villanova	W 81–76	13–5 (5–3)	Hartford Civic Center (16,294); Hartford, CT
February 5; 12:00 p.m., WTXX	No. 23	St. John's	W 68–46	14–5 (6–3)	Gampel Pavilion (10,167); Storrs, CT
February 7; 7:00 p.m., ESPN	No. 19	at No. 8 Syracuse; Rivalry	W 74–66	15–5 (7–3)	Carrier Dome (27,651); Syracuse, NY
February 13*; 1:00 p.m., CBS	No. 19	No. 2 North Carolina	L 70–77	15–6	Hartford Civic Center (16,294); Hartford, CT
February 15; 7:00 p.m., ESPN2	No. 18	at Providence	W 94–89 ^{2OT}	16–6 (8–3)	Dunkin' Donuts Center (12,993); Providence, RI
February 19; 6:00 p.m., ESPN	No. 18	at Rutgers	W 85–63	17–6 (9–3)	Louis Brown Athletic Center (8,011); Piscataway, NJ
February 21; 7:00 p.m., ESPN	No. 17	Notre Dame	W 88–74	18–6 (10–3)	Hartford Civic Center (16,294); Hartford, CT
February 26; 3:45 p.m., CBS	No. 17	at No. 18 Pittsburgh	W 73–64	19–6 (11–3)	Petersen Events Center (12,508); Pittsburgh, PA
March 2; 7:30 p.m., WTXX	No. 15	Georgetown; Rivalry	W 83–64	20–6 (12–3)	Gampel Pavilion (10,167); Storrs, CT
March 5; 4:00 p.m., CBS	No. 15	No. 13 Syracuse; Rivalry	W 88–70	21–6 (13–3)	Gampel Pavilion (10,167); Storrs, CT
Big East tournament
March 10; 7:00 p.m., ESPN2	No. 12	vs. Georgetown; Second Round/Rivalry	W 66–62	22–6	Madison Square Garden (19,528); New York, NY
March 11; 9:00 p.m., ESPN	No. 12	vs. No. 18 Syracuse; Semifinals/Rivalry	L 63–67	22–7	Madison Square Garden (19,528); New York, NY
NCAA tournament
March 18*; 2:35 p.m., CBS	(2 S) No. 13	vs. (15 S) Central Florida; First Round	W 77–71	23–7	DCU Center (13,009); Worcester, MA
March 20*; 12:10 p.m., CBS	(2 S) No. 13	vs. (10 S) NC State; Second Round	L 62–65	23–8	DCU Center (13,009); Worcester, MA
*Non-conference game. ^{#}Rankings from AP Poll. S=Syracuse Region. (#) Tournament seedings in parentheses. All times are in EST.

Schedule Source:
