= 2004–05 Georgetown Hoyas men's basketball team =

American college basketball season

2004–05 Georgetown Hoyas men's basketball

National Invitation Tournament, Quarterfinals
- Conference: Big East
- Record: 19–13 (8–8 Big East)
- Head coach: John Thompson III (1st season)
- Assistant coaches: Robert Burke (1st season); Kevin Broadus (1st season); Sydney Johnson (1st season)
- Captains: Ashanti Cook; Brandon Bowman
- Home arena: MCI Center

2004–05 Big East men's basketball standings
| | Conf. | | | | Overall |
| Team | W | | L | PCT | W | | L | PCT |
|---|---|---|---|---|---|---|---|---|
| No. 14 Boston College | 13 | – | 3 | .813 | 25 | – | 5 | .833 |
| No. 13 Connecticut | 13 | – | 3 | .813 | 23 | – | 8 | .742 |
| No. 19 Villanova | 11 | – | 5 | .688 | 24 | – | 8 | .750 |
| Pittsburgh | 10 | – | 6 | .625 | 20 | – | 9 | .690 |
| Notre Dame | 9 | – | 7 | .563 | 17 | – | 12 | .586 |
| Georgetown | 8 | – | 8 | .500 | 19 | – | 13 | .594 |
| West Virginia | 8 | – | 8 | .500 | 24 | – | 11 | .686 |
| Providence | 4 | – | 12 | .250 | 14 | – | 17 | .452 |
| Seton Hall | 4 | – | 12 | .250 | 12 | – | 16 | .429 |
| Rutgers | 2 | – | 14 | .125 | 10 | – | 19 | .345 |
| St. John's* | 3 | – | 13 | .188 | 9 | – | 18 | .333 |
| No. 11 Syracuse†** | 0 | – | 5 | .000 | 12 | – | 7 | .632 |
† 2005 Big East tournament winner As of April 4, 2005; Rankings from AP Poll; *Not eligible for the 2005 Big East tournament due to sanctions against the program. **Syracuse had 15 regular season games vacated due to sanctions against the program; Syracuse′s disputed record was 27–7, 11–5.

The 2004–05 Georgetown Hoyas men's basketball team represented Georgetown University in the 2004–05 NCAA Division I college basketball season. The Hoyas were coached by John Thompson III – his first year at Georgetown – and played their home games at the MCI Center in Washington, DC. The Hoyas were members of the Big East Conference. They finished the season 19–13, 8–8 in Big East play. They advanced to the quarterfinals of the 2005 Big East men's basketball tournament before losing to Connecticut They played in the 2005 National Invitation Tournament and advanced to the quarterfinals before losing to South Carolina.

== Season recap ==
John Thompson III, the son of legendary Georgetown head coach John Thompson, Jr., arrived from Princeton, where he had served as head coach for four seasons, as only the second person with prior head coaching experience to take over the Georgetown's men's basketball program. (Note: The first, Elmer Ripley, had coached the Hoyas from 1927 to 1929, 1938 to 1943, and 1946 to 1949.) He made a decisive change in Georgetown's style of basketball. John Thompson, Jr., and his successor Craig Esherick had emphasized fast, running, very physical play over their combined 32 years as head coach at Georgetown, but, upon taking over the program from Esherick, John Thompson III introduced the "Princeton offense" he had learned as a player and assistant coach under Pete Carril at Princeton and had himself employed at Princeton during his four years as head coach there. The Princeton offense emphasizes ball movement, dribbling, passing, and backdoor cuts to set up more deliberate, and often more slowly developing, scoring opportunities.

Junior forward and team co-captain Brandon Bowman started all 32 games – as he would all 127 games of his collegiate career. The Princeton offense suited him, and his scoring improved from his first two years with the team. Over the first four games of the season, he averaged 22 points, and he went on to lead the team in scoring in 15 games and in rebounding 13 times. He scored on a layup with eight seconds remaining in the game to give the Hoyas an upset win over 16th-ranked Pittsburgh on January 5, 2005, their only win over a ranked opponent during the season. Against seventh-ranked Syracuse 13 days later, he scored to tie the game and force overtime, narrowly missing winning the game with the shot when officials determined that his foot had been on the three-point line when he launched it and ruled it a two-pointer. In a game against Seton Hall on February 2, 2005, he scored 28 points and shot 14-for-15 (93.3%) from the free-throw line.

The change in the team's offensive philosophy also played to the strengths of junior guard and team co-captain Ashanti Cook, who started all 32 games, the second straight season he had started every game. He averaged 32 minutes a game and emerged as a leader on the floor, displaying expertise on defense and impressive shooting accuracy. He had his best offensive season as a Hoya, averaging 10.8 points a game and scoring in double figures 19 times. He shot 4-for-4 from three-point range and scored a career-high 23 points at Pittsburgh on January 5, 2005, and he again scored 23 points in the game against Seton Hall on February 2, 2005.

Senior forward Darrel Owens started the first 12 games of the year, but then moved to the bench to make room for freshman center Roy Hibbert on the starting roster. Owens started only three more games during his collegiate career, and at first struggled in his new reserve role; during a nine-game stretch at midseason after coming out of the starting lineup, he shot only 28 percent from the field and averaged only one field goal per game. For his part, Hibbert started 17 games during the season, averaging 15.8 minutes, 5.1 points, and 3.5 rebounds per game. He had two double-doubles during the year and finished the season second on the team in blocked shots with 40. Against Notre Dame at the MCI Center on January 23, 2005, he scored on a game-winning slam-dunk to give the Hoyas a 55–54 win, and he went on to achieve what were then various career highs for him, including a 15-point game at Notre Dame, a 14-rebound game at Syracuse, a five-assist game against San Jose State, a three-steal game against West Virginia, and three blocked shots in four different games.

Freshman guard Jonathan Wallace was another addition to the team. He started all 32 games and averaged 30.4 minutes, 6.5 points, 2.2 assists, 2.1 rebounds, and 1.2 steals per game. He had a season-high 20 points at Davidson, twice had six assists, had four steals against St. John's, and over the course of the year shot 78.8 percent in free throws.

Freshman forward Jeff Green quickly emerged as a star of the team. He started all 32 games and averaged 33.8 minutes per game. In December 2004 he was selected to the Rainbow Classic All-Tournament Team. Over the course of the season he shot 50.2 percent from the field and had five double-doubles. He finished the year as the team's second-leading scorer, averaging 13.1 points per game overall and 13.4 in Big East play, and as its leader in rebounding with 6.6 per game, assists with 2.9 per game, and blocked shots with 1.6 per game. His season highs were 22 points against Connecticut on January 8, 2005, 12 rebounds at Villanova a week later, seven assists at Boston College on January 29, 2005, six blocked shots against Penn State, and four steals against Long Beach State.

The team lost its first game of the season, extending Georgetown's losing streak to 10 games dating back to the previous season, but then began to win, and it completed the non-conference portion of its schedule at 8–3. It then began Big East play, pushing its record to 16–6 overall and 8–3 in the conference before dropping its final five games to finish the regular season with a 16–11 overall record and 8–8 in the conference, good for a tie for seventh place in the Big East standings. The Hoyas beat Seton Hall in the first round of the 2005 Big East tournament with Darrel Owens emerging from his midseason slump to score 14 points against the Pirates, but lost to 12th-ranked Connecticut in the quarterfinals.

With a 17–12 record after the loss to Connecticut, Georgetown missed the NCAA tournament for the fourth straight year and seventh time in the previous eight years. However, the Hoyas returned to post-season tournament play for the first time since the 2002-03 season when they were invited to the 2005 National Invitation Tournament (NIT), their third invitation to and second appearance in the NIT in four years (Note: Georgetown declined its invitation to the 2002 National Invitation Tournament, choosing to forego postseason play and keep its players in class after the 2001-02 season.) and sixth invitation to and fifth appearance in the NIT in eight years. Georgetown easily defeated Boston University at the MCI Center in the first round and had a 17-point win over Cal State Fullerton at McDonough Gymnasium in the second round in a game in which Ashanti Cook tied his career high with 10 rebounds. In the quarterfinals, Darrel Owens scored a career-high 26 points to push his per-game scoring average over the three NIT games to 18 points, but the Hoyas lost in a close game at eventual tournament champion South Carolina to finish the season with a record of 19–15.

After the season, senior forward/guard Darrell Owens graduated and freshman forward Cornelio Guibunda left the team to transfer to American.

The 2004–2005 season saw the end of the annual series between Georgetown and Boston College that had begun in the 1958–1959 season. The longtime rivalry between the schools came to end with the departure of Boston College from the Big East at the end of the season to join the Atlantic Coast Conference.

== Roster ==
| # | Name | Height | Weight (lbs.) | Position | Class | Hometown | Previous Team(s) |
|---|---|---|---|---|---|---|---|
| 0 | Ashanti Cook | 6'2" | 180 | G | Jr. | Inglewood, CA, U.S. | Westchester HS |
| 1 | Brandon Bowman | 6'8 1/2" | 219 | F | Jr. | Santa Monica, CA, U.S. | Westchester HS |
| 2 | Jonathan Wallace | 6'1" | 178 | G | Fr. | Harvest, AL, U.S. | Sparkman HS |
| 4 | Kenny Izzo | 6'8" | 210 | F | So. | Chicago, IL, U.S. | Fenwick HS |
| 5 | Ray Reed | 6'1" | 175 | G | So. | Inglewood, CA, U.S. | Inglewood HS |
| 10 | RaMell Ross | 6'6" | 205 | G/|F | RS So. | Fairfax, VA, U.S. | Lake Braddock Secondary |
| 20 | Darrell Owens | 6'6 1/2" | 210 | F/G | Sr. | Napoleonville, LA, U.S. | Assumption HS |
| 21 | Cornelio Guibunda | 6'9" | 227 | F | Fr. | Maputo, Mozambique | King Low Heywood Thomas (Conn.) |
| 22 | Tyler Crawford | 6'4" | 196 | G/F | Fr. | Staunton, VA, U.S. | Robert E. Lee HS |
| 32 | Jeff Green | 6'8 1/2" | 225 | F | Fr. | Hyattsville, MD, U.S. | Northwestern HS |
| 40 | Ryan Beal | 6'5" | 195 | G | Jr. | Coral Gables, FL, U.S. | Ransom Everglades School |
| 44 | Amadou Kilkenny-Diaw | 6'8" | 235 | F/C | Jr. | Washington, DC, U.S. | St. Albans School |
| 52 | Sead Dizderevic | 6'8" | 235 | F | So. | Serbia and Montenegro | North Highland HS |
| 55 | Roy Hibbert | 7'2" | 272 | C | Fr. | Adelphi, MD, U.S. | Georgetown Prep |

== Rankings ==
The team was not ranked in the Top 25 in either the AP Poll or the Coaches' Poll at any time.

== 2004–05 Schedule and results ==
- All times are Eastern

| Date time, TV | Rank^{#} | Opponent^{#} | Result | Record | Site (attendance) city, state |
Regular season
| Mon., Nov. 22, 2004*; 7:30 p.m. | | Temple | L 57–75 | 0–1 | MCI Center (6,320); Washington, DC |
| Fri., Nov. 26, 2004*; 7:30pm | | The Citadel | W 69–34 | 1–1 | MCI Center (4,989); Washington, DC |
| Tue., Nov. 30, 2004*; 7:00pm | | at Davidson | W 76–51 | 2–1 | John M. Belk Arena (2,726); Davidson, NC |
| Mon., Dec. 6, 2004*; 7:30pm | | Penn State | W 66–53 | 3–1 | MCI Center (6,127); Washington, DC |
| Thu., Dec. 9, 2004*; 7:30pm | | No. 1 Illinois | L 59–74 | 3–2 | MCI Center (12,401); Washington, DC |
| Sat., Dec. 11, 2004*; 5:00pm | | San Jose State | W 58–40 | 4–2 | MCI Center (2,154); Washington, DC |
| Mon., Dec. 20, 2004*; 10:00pm | | vs. Oral Roberts; Rainbow Classic Quarterfinal | L 63–81 | 4–3 | Stan Sheriff Center (7,382); Honolulu, HI |
| Wed., Dec. 22, 2004*; 4:00pm | | vs. Long Beach State; Rainbow Classic Consolation | W 57–51 | 5–3 | Stan Sheriff Center (6,212); Honolulu, HI |
| Thu., Dec. 23, 2004*; 6:30pm | | vs. Clemson; Rainbow Classic Consolation | W 75–60 | 6–3 | Stan Sheriff Center (6,227); Honolulu, HI |
| Tue., Dec. 28, 2004*; 1:00pm | | Norfolk State | W 78–70 | 7–3 | MCI Center (6,071); Washington, DC |
| Thu., Dec. 30, 2004*; 7:30pm | | Howard | W 79–56 | 8–3 | MCI Center (7,671); Washington, DC |
| Wed., Jan. 5, 2005; 7:00 noon | | at No. 16 Pittsburgh | W 67–64 | 9–3 (1–0) | Petersen Events Center (11,425); Pittsburgh, PA |
| Sat., Jan. 8, 2005; 12:00 noon | | No. 10 Connecticut; Rivalry | L 59–66 | 9–4 (1–1) | MCI Center (11,363); Washington, DC |
| Tue., Jan. 11, 2005; 1:00pm | | Rutgers | W 65–62 | 10–4 (2–1) | MCI Center (6,905); Washington, DC |
| Sat., Jan. 15, 2005; 2:00pm | | at Villanova | W 66–64 | 11–4 (3–1) | The Pavilion (6,500); Villanova, PA |
| Tue., Jan. 18, 2005; 7:00pm | | at No. 7 Syracuse; Rivalry | L 73–78 ^{OT} | 11–5 (3–2) | Carrier Dome (23,485); Syracuse, NY |
| Sun., Jan. 23, 2005; 12:00 noon | | Notre Dame | W 55–54 | 12–5 (4–2) | MCI Center (9,305); Washington, DC |
| Thu., Jan. 25, 2005; 7:30pm | | St. John's | W 66–57 | 13–5 (5–2) | MCI Center (7,864); Washington, DC |
| Sat., Jan. 29, 2005; 7:30pm | | at No. 8 Boston College | L 49–64 | 13–6 (5–3) | Silvio O. Conte Forum (8,606); Chestnut Hill, MA |
| Wed., Feb. 2, 2005; 8:00pm | | Seton Hall | W 61–51 | 14–6 (6–3) | MCI Center (8,568); Washington, DC |
| Sat., Feb. 5, 2005; 7:00pm | | at Rutgers | W 61–56 | 15–6 (7–3) | Louis Brown Athletic Center (8,007); Piscataway, NJ |
| Sat., Feb. 12, 2005; 4:00pm | | West Virginia | W 67–60 | 16–6 (8–3) | MCI Center (14,458); Washington, DC |
| Wed., Feb. 16, 2005; 8:00pm | | at Notre Dame | L 64–70 | 16–7 (8–4) | Edmund P. Joyce Center (11,418); Notre Dame, IN |
| Sun., Feb. 20, 2005; 2:00pm | | at St. John's | L 67–76 | 16–8 (8–5) | Madison Square Garden (7,464); New York, NY |
| Sun., Feb. 27, 2005; 12:00 noon | | No. 23 Villanova | L 56–67 | 16–9 (8–6) | MCI Center (11,770); Washington, DC |
| Wed., Mar. 2, 2005; 7:30pm | | at No. 15 Connecticut; Rivalry | L 64–83 | 16–10 (8–7) | Harry A. Gampel Pavilion (10,167); Storrs, CT |
| Sat., Mar. 5, 2005; 7:30pm | | Providence | L 65–68 | 16–11 (8–8) | MCI Center (11,863); Washington, DC |
Big East tournament
| Wed., Mar. 9, 2005; 7:00pm | (7) | vs. (10) Seton Hall; First Round | W 56–51 | 17–11 | Madison Square Garden (19,528); New York, NY |
| Thu., Mar. 10, 2005; 7:00pm | (7) | vs. (2) No. 12 Connecticut; Quarterfinal/Rivalry | L 62–66 | 17–12 | Madison Square Garden (19,528); New York, NY |
National Invitation Tournament
| Wed., Mar. 16, 2005; 7:30pm | | Boston University; First Round | W 64–34 | 18–12 | MCI Center (2,797); Washington, DC |
| Tue., Mar. 22, 2005; 7:00pm | | California State Fullerton; Second Round | W 74–57 | 19–12 | McDonough Gymnasium (2,604); Washington, DC |
| Thu., Mar. 24, 2005; 7:30pm | | at South Carolina; Quarterfinal | L 66–69 | 19–13 | Colonial Center (10,662); Columbia, SC |
*Non-conference game. ^{#}Rankings from AP Poll. (#) Tournament seedings in parentheses.

== Awards and honors ==
=== Big East Conference honors ===
Postseason honors
| Honors | Player | Position | Date awarded | Ref. |
|---|---|---|---|---|
| Big East Co-Rookie of the Year | Jeff Green | F | March 8, 2005 | |
| All-Big East Third Team | Brandon Bowman | F | | |
| All-Big East Honorable Mention | Jeff Green | F | | |
| All-Big East Rookie Team | Jeff Green | F | | |
