= 2004–05 Boston College Eagles men's basketball team =

American college basketball season

2004–05 Boston College Eagles men's basketball
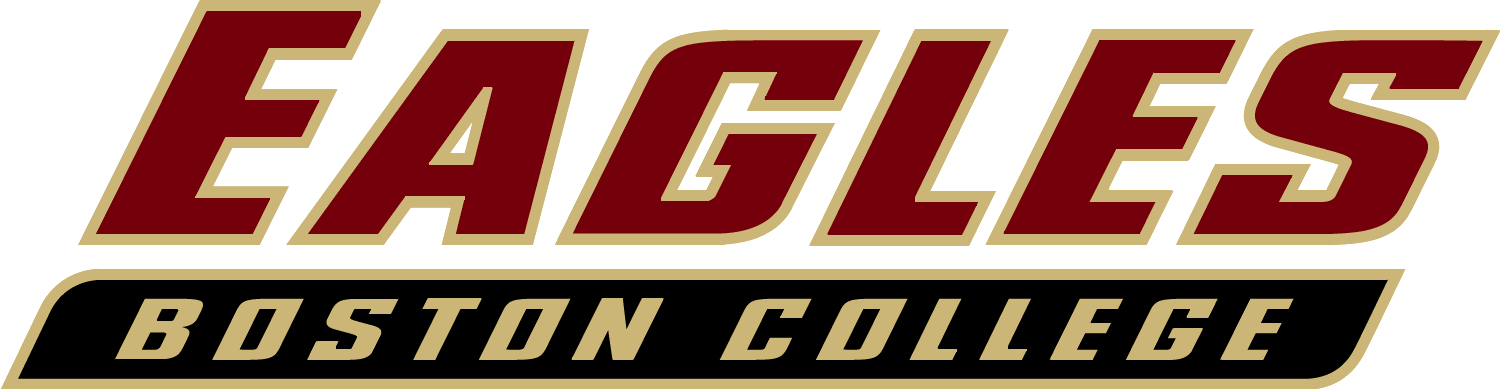

Big East regular season co-champions

NCAA tournament, Round of 32
- Conference: Big East Conference

Ranking
- Coaches: No. 19
- AP: No. 14
- Record: 25–5 (13–3 Big East)
- Head coach: Al Skinner (8th season)
- Home arena: Conte Forum

2004–05 Big East men's basketball standings
	Conf.				Overall
Team	W		L	PCT	W		L	PCT
No. 14 Boston College	13	–	3	.813	25	–	5	.833
No. 13 Connecticut	13	–	3	.813	23	–	8	.742
No. 19 Villanova	11	–	5	.688	24	–	8	.750
Pittsburgh	10	–	6	.625	20	–	9	.690
Notre Dame	9	–	7	.563	17	–	12	.586
Georgetown	8	–	8	.500	19	–	13	.594
West Virginia	8	–	8	.500	24	–	11	.686
Providence	4	–	12	.250	14	–	17	.452
Seton Hall	4	–	12	.250	12	–	16	.429
Rutgers	2	–	14	.125	10	–	19	.345
St. John's*	3	–	13	.188	9	–	18	.333
No. 11 Syracuse†**	0	–	5	.000	12	–	7	.632
† 2005 Big East tournament winner As of April 4, 2005; Rankings from AP Poll; *Not eligible for the 2005 Big East tournament due to sanctions against the program. **Syracuse had 15 regular season games vacated due to sanctions against the program; Syracuse′s disputed record was 27–7, 11–5.

The 2004–05 Boston College Eagles men's basketball team played college basketball for the Boston College Eagles as a member of the Big East Conference during the 2004–05 NCAA Division I men's basketball season. Led by head coach Al Skinner, the team played their home games at the Conte Forum in Chestnut Hill, Massachusetts. After finishing tied atop the conference regular season standings, the Eagles lost in the quarterfinals of the Big East Tournament to West Virginia. The team received an at-large bid to the NCAA tournament as the No. 4 seed in the Chicago region. BC defeated Penn in the opening round before being upset by No. 12 seed UW-Milwaukee 83–75. The team finished with an overall record of 25–5 (13–3 Big East).

== Roster ==
2004–05 Boston College Eagles men's basketball team
Players
Coaches

Pos.	#	Name	Height	Weight	Year	Previous school	Hometown
F	1	Craig Smith	6 ft 7 in (2.01 m)	250 lb (113 kg)	Jr	Fairfax HS	Inglewood, California
F	3	Jared Dudley	6 ft 7 in (2.01 m)	225 lb (102 kg)	So	Horizon HS	San Diego, California
G	4	Jermaine Watson	6 ft 3 in (1.91 m)	205 lb (93 kg)	Sr	Tabor Academy	Dorchester, Massachusetts
F	5	Akida McLain	6 ft 7 in (2.01 m)	215 lb (98 kg)	Fr	Penn Hills HS	Pittsburgh, Pennsylvania
G	11	Louis Hinnant	6 ft 4 in (1.93 m)	200 lb (91 kg)	Jr	Gwynn Park HS	Oxon Hill, Maryland
G	12	Steve Hailey	6 ft 0 in (1.83 m)	170 lb (77 kg)	So	Worcester Academy	Boston, Massachusetts
C	13	Nate Doornekamp	7 ft 0 in (2.13 m)	260 lb (118 kg)	Sr	Ernestown Secondary School	Odessa, Ontario, Canada
F	20	Gordon Watt	6 ft 6 in (1.98 m)	213 lb (97 kg)	Fr	Evanston Township HS	Evanston, Illinois
G	21	Tyler Neville	6 ft 3 in (1.91 m)	200 lb (91 kg)	Jr	Ridgewood HS	Ridgewood, New Jersey
G	23	Sean Marshall	6 ft 5 in (1.96 m)	212 lb (96 kg)	So	Eisenhower HS	Rialto, California
G	25	Ted Dunlap	6 ft 3 in (1.91 m)	195 lb (88 kg)	Jr	Jesuit College Preparatory School of Dallas	Dallas, Texas
F	32	John Oates	6 ft 10 in (2.08 m)	255 lb (116 kg)	Fr	Don Bosco Prep	Harriman, New York
F/C	51	Sean Williams	6 ft 10 in (2.08 m)	230 lb (104 kg)	Fr	Mansfield HS	Houston, Texas

Head coach

- Al Skinner

Assistant coach(es)

Legend

- (C) Team captain
- (S) Suspended
- (I) Ineligible
- (W) Walk-on
- Injured
- Current redshirt

Roster

== Schedule and results ==
Date time, TV	Rank^{#}	Opponent^{#}	Result	Record	Site city, state
Regular Season
Nov 19, 2004*		Maine	W 72–58	1–0	Silvio O. Conte Forum; Chestnut Hill, Massachusetts
Nov 23, 2004*		New Hampshire	W 84–62	2–0	Silvio O. Conte Forum; Chestnut Hill, Massachusetts
Nov 26, 2004*		Clemson	W 79–70	3–0	Silvio O. Conte Forum; Chestnut Hill, Massachusetts
Nov 30, 2004*		Long Island	W 87–46	4–0	Silvio O. Conte Forum; Chestnut Hill, Massachusetts
Dec 5, 2004*		vs. UCLA; John R. Wooden Classic	W 74–64	5–0	Arrowhead Pond of Anaheim; Anaheim, California
Dec 9, 2004*		Holy Cross	W 63–60 ^{OT}	6–0	Silvio O. Conte Forum; Chestnut Hill, Massachusetts
Dec 11, 2004*		Boston University	W 80–74	7–0	Silvio O. Conte Forum; Chestnut Hill, Massachusetts
Dec 19, 2004*		Yale	W 82–80 ^{2OT}	8–0	Silvio O. Conte Forum; Chestnut Hill, Massachusetts
Dec 22, 2004*		Duquesne	W 88–70	9–0	Silvio O. Conte Forum; Chestnut Hill, Massachusetts
Dec 29, 2004*		Kent State	W 67–65	10–0	Silvio O. Conte Forum; Chestnut Hill, Massachusetts
Jan 2, 2005*		at UMass	W 67–48	11–0	Mullins Center; Amherst, Massachusetts
Conference Regular Season
Jan 5, 2005	No. 25	at No. 10 Connecticut	W 75–70	12–0 (1–0)	Harry A. Gampel Pavilion; Storrs, Connecticut
Jan 8, 2005*	No. 25	Providence	W 69–60	13–0 (2–0)	Silvio O. Conte Forum; Chestnut Hill, Massachusetts
Jan 16, 2005	No. 13	at West Virginia	W 73–53	14–0 (3–0)	WVU Coliseum; Morgantown, West Virginia
Jan 19, 2005	No. 9	Villanova	W 67–66	15–0 (4–0)	Silvio O. Conte Forum; Chestnut Hill, Massachusetts
Jan 22, 2005	No. 9	at St. John's	W 79–73	16–0 (5–0)	Madison Square Garden; New York, New York
Jan 26, 2005	No. 8	at Providence	W 78–75	17–0 (6–0)	Dunkin' Donuts Center; Providence, Rhode Island
Jan 29, 2005	No. 8	Georgetown	W 64–49	18–0 (7–0)	Silvio O. Conte Forum; Chestnut Hill, Massachusetts
Feb 1, 2005	No. 5	West Virginia	W 62–50	19–0 (8–0)	Silvio O. Conte Forum; Chestnut Hill, Massachusetts
Feb 5, 2005	No. 5	at Seton Hall	W 60–52	20–0 (9–0)	Continental Airlines Arena; East Rutherford, New Jersey
Feb 8, 2005	No. 4	at Notre Dame	L 65–68	20–1 (9–1)	Joyce Center; Notre Dame, Indiana
Feb 16, 2005	No. 6	Rutgers	W 74–64	21–1 (10–1)	Silvio O. Conte Forum; Chestnut Hill, Massachusetts
Feb 19, 2005	No. 6	No. 9 Syracuse	W 65–60	22–1 (11–1)	Silvio O. Conte Forum; Chestnut Hill, Massachusetts
Feb 23, 2005	No. 3	at No. 23 Villanova	L 70–76	22–2 (11–2)	Wells Fargo Center; Philadelphia, Pennsylvania
Feb 26, 2005*	No. 3	Seton Hall	W 70–58	23–2 (12–2)	Silvio O. Conte Forum; Chestnut Hill, Massachusetts
Feb 28, 2005	No. 5	No. 24 Pittsburgh	L 50–72	23–3 (12–3)	Silvio O. Conte Forum; Chestnut Hill, Massachusetts
Mar 5, 2005	No. 5	at Rutgers	W 78–66	24–3 (13–3)	Louis Brown Athletic Center; Piscataway, New Jersey
Big East Tournament
Mar 10, 2005*	No. 7	vs. West Virginia; Quarterfinals	L 72–78	24–4	Madison Square Garden; New York, New York
NCAA Tournament
Mar 17, 2005*	(4 CHI) No. 14	vs. (13 CHI) Penn; Second Round	W 85–65	25–4	Henry J. Goodman Arena; Cleveland, Ohio
Mar 19, 2005*	(4 CHI) No. 14	vs. (12 CHI) Milwaukee; Second Round	L 75–83	25–5	Henry J. Goodman Arena; Cleveland, Ohio
*Non-conference game. ^{#}Rankings from AP Poll. (#) Tournament seedings in parentheses. CHI=Chicago.
