= 2004–05 Providence Friars men's basketball team =

American college basketball season

2004–05 Providence Friars men's basketball
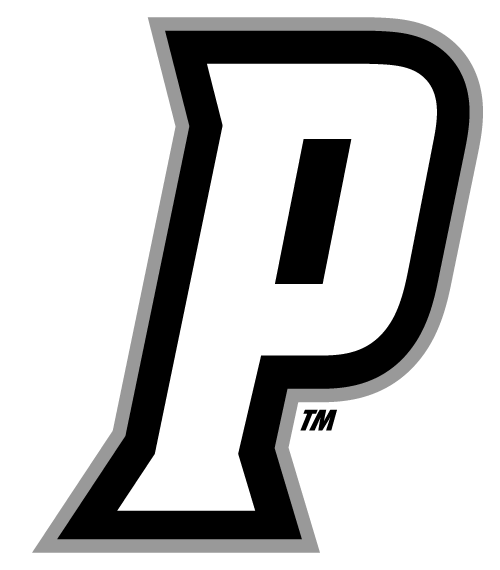
- Conference: Big East Conference
- Record: 14-17 (4-12 Big East)
- Head coach: Tim Welsh
- Home arena: Dunkin' Donuts Center

2004–05 Big East men's basketball standings
	Conf.				Overall
Team	W		L	PCT	W		L	PCT
No. 14 Boston College	13	–	3	.813	25	–	5	.833
No. 13 Connecticut	13	–	3	.813	23	–	8	.742
No. 19 Villanova	11	–	5	.688	24	–	8	.750
Pittsburgh	10	–	6	.625	20	–	9	.690
Notre Dame	9	–	7	.563	17	–	12	.586
Georgetown	8	–	8	.500	19	–	13	.594
West Virginia	8	–	8	.500	24	–	11	.686
Providence	4	–	12	.250	14	–	17	.452
Seton Hall	4	–	12	.250	12	–	16	.429
Rutgers	2	–	14	.125	10	–	19	.345
St. John's*	3	–	13	.188	9	–	18	.333
No. 11 Syracuse†**	0	–	5	.000	12	–	7	.632
† 2005 Big East tournament winner As of April 4, 2005; Rankings from AP Poll; *Not eligible for the 2005 Big East tournament due to sanctions against the program. **Syracuse had 15 regular season games vacated due to sanctions against the program; Syracuse′s disputed record was 27–7, 11–5.

The 2004–05 Providence Friars men's basketball team represented Providence College in the Big East Conference. The team finished with a 14-17 record.

On November 27, 2004, the Friars were defeated by Florida 84-66 in the Orange Bowl Basketball Classic.

On March 9, 2005, Providence was eliminated from the Big East tournament in a first round loss to West Virginia 82-59.
