= Allan Ray =

American basketball player (born 1984)

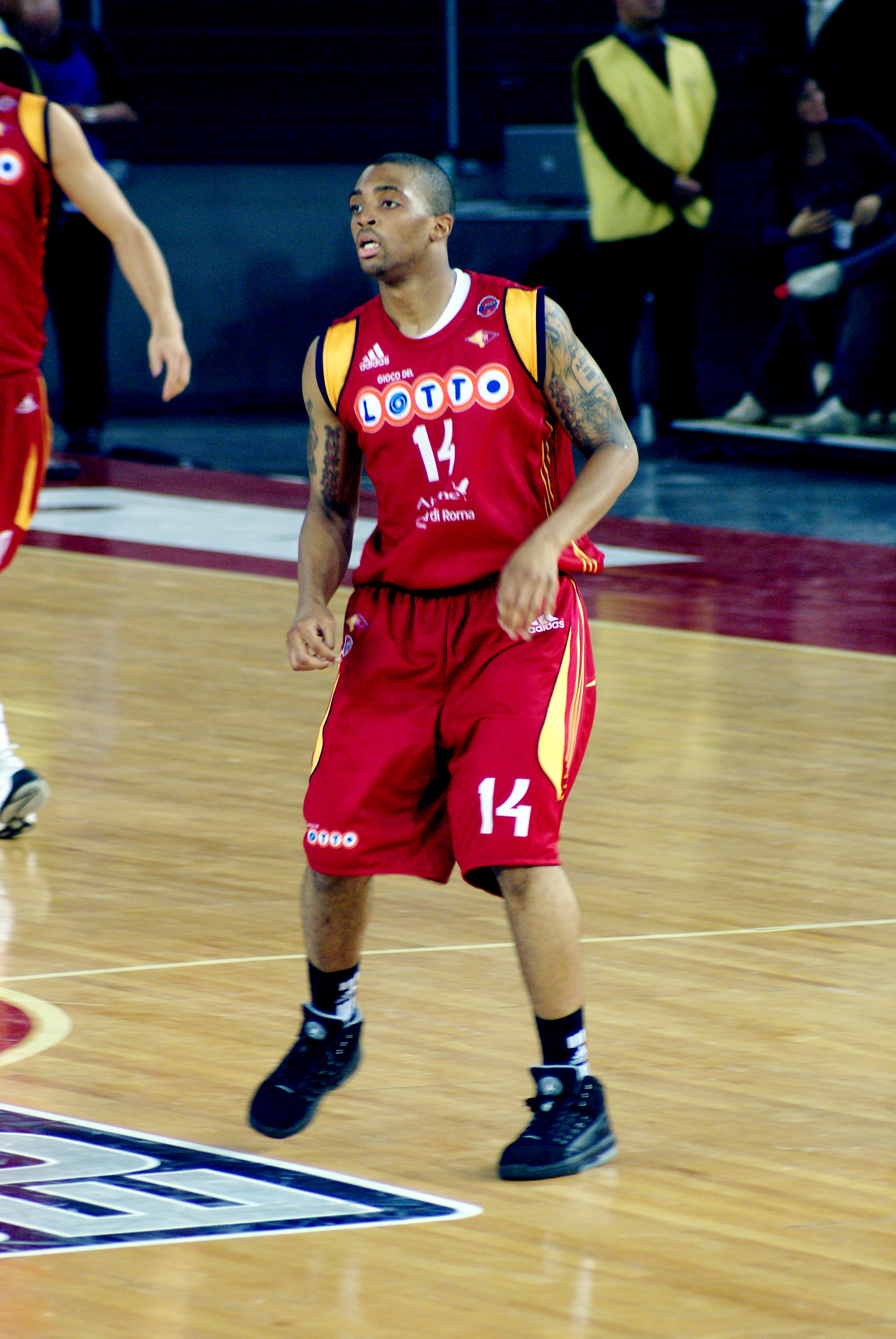
- Ray in 2007

Personal information
- Born: June 17, 1984 (age 42) Bronx, New York, U.S.
- Listed height: 6 ft 2 in (1.88 m)
- Listed weight: 185 lb (84 kg)

Career information
- High school: St. Raymond (Bronx, New York)
- College: Villanova (2002–2006)
- NBA draft: 2006: undrafted
- Playing career: 2006–2019
- Position: Point guard / shooting guard
- Number: 12, 14

Career history
- 2006–2007: Boston Celtics
- 2007: Austin Toros
- 2007–2009: Lottomatica Roma
- 2009: Carife Ferrara
- 2010–2011: Sutor Montegranaro
- 2011: Krka Novo Mesto
- 2011–2012: Élan Béarnais Pau-Orthez
- 2012–2013: Ratiopharm Ulm
- 2013–2014: Cedevita Zagreb
- 2014–2015: Virtus Bologna
- 2016–2017: APU Udine
- 2017: TED Ankara Kolejliler
- 2017–2019: Byblos Club

Career highlights
- Croatian League champion (2014); Croatian Cup champion (2014); Slovenian League champion (2011); Slovenian Supercup champion (2011); Consensus second-team All-American (2006); First-team All-Big East (2006); Second-team All-Big East (2005); Third-team All-Big East (2004); No. 14 jersey retired by Villanova Wildcats
- Stats at NBA.com
- Stats at Basketball Reference

Allan Nathaniel Ray (born June 17, 1984) is an American sports agent and former professional basketball player. He played college basketball for four years at Villanova University. He played one season (2006–07) with the Boston Celtics of the National Basketball Association.

== College career ==
Ray was recruited out of that year's New York State Champions, St. Raymond High School, by Villanova head coach Jay Wright. He committed to the Wildcats in 2001, along with three other players that made up a highly praised recruiting class. Along with Randy Foye, Curtis Sumpter and Jason Fraser, Ray was part of a class proclaimed as the players to lead the Wildcats back to a championship.

=== Freshman and sophomore seasons ===
Ray's career at Villanova was slightly hampered by injuries, but nothing that kept him from scoring 2,000 points as a Wildcat. His freshman season, he was a key contributor. He had 16 points in his Wildcat debut against Marquette on November 15, 2002. As a sophomore, he averaged a team-leading 17.3 points per game.

=== Junior season ===
In his junior season, Ray was named second team all-Big East and led the Wildcats in scoring with 16.2 ppg. That year, he also led Villanova to the Sweet 16 of the 2005 NCAA tournament where they lost to eventual national champion North Carolina by one point.

=== Senior season ===
His senior season was arguably Ray's best season as a college player when he averaged 18.5 ppg. Villanova tied for the Big East regular-season championship with UConn and split their two games with the Huskies. Their final Big East regular-season record was 14–2. Overall, their record was 28–5. In 2006, Ray was named to the Big East first team, along with teammate Randy Foye, who was given the honor of Big East Player of the Year. Ray led Villanova to the Elite Eight of the 2006 NCAA tournament, playing in a four-guard offense with Foye, Kyle Lowry and Mike Nardi.

=== Eye injury ===
During the 2006 Big East tournament, Ray was poked in the eye by Carl Krauser during the semifinal game against Pittsburgh. His vision apparently left him for a period of time and his eyeball had seemed to come loose from the socket, leading most to believe it was an extremely serious injury. However, his vision returned and it turned out to be only soft tissue damage. He was able to play less than a week later in the NCAA tournament, without goggles. In his first game back, he led Villanova in scoring. While on the video it appeared as though his eye came loose from the socket, his eyelid actually went behind his eye, giving off the impression of his eye coming loose.

== Professional career ==
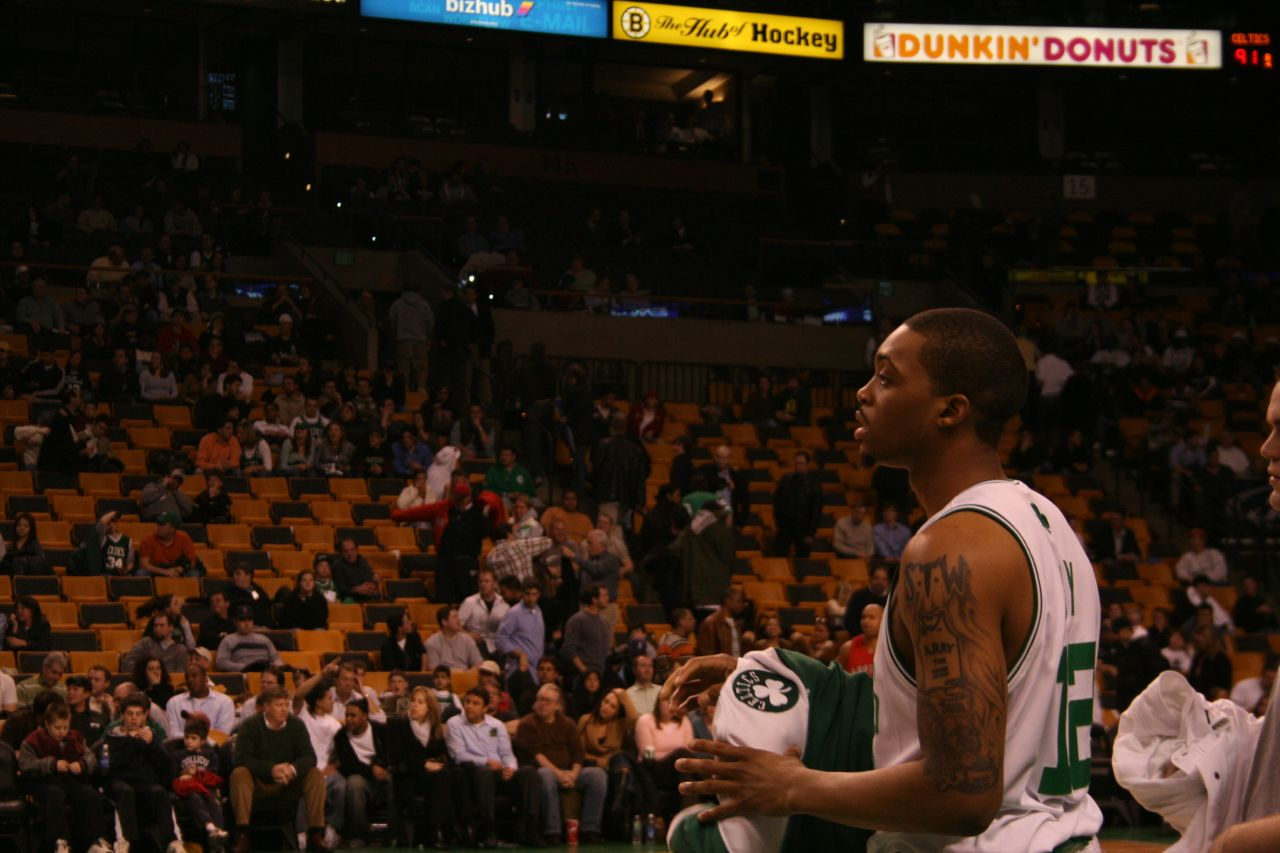
Ray during a game with the Celtics

Ray was not selected in the 2006 NBA draft, surprising many Big East fans and some NBA experts. On July 6, 2006, he was signed as a free agent by the Boston Celtics. Ray was sent to the D-League Austin Toros, but was recalled after just two games there. He led the Toros in scoring in both games he played for them. During the last two months of the season, Ray began receiving extended playing time with the Celtics, and had two 22-point games and three others where he scored 20, 18 and 17 points. Ray was also fourth among rookies in three-point percentage. Despite a seemingly bright future in Boston, Ray agreed to terms on a $2 million contract to play in Italy, instead of having the Celtics pick up his $687,456 option.

Ray signed with the Euroleague club Lottomatica Virtus Roma on July 27, 2007. Midway through the following season, after the club signed Brandon Jennings (whom Ray served as a mentor to), Ray left to sign a contract with Carife Ferrara for the remaining part of the season. After sitting out the 2009–10 season to recover from knee surgery, Ray signed with Sutor Montegranaro for the 2010–11 season.

In November 2011 he signed a temporary contract with BC Krka in Slovenia, but in December 2011 he signed a new contract with Élan Béarnais Pau-Orthez in France.

In August 2012, he moved to Germany and signed with ratiopharm Ulm for the 2012–13 season.

In November 2013, he signed with the Croatian team Cedevita Zagreb for the rest of the 2013–14 season.

On July 30, 2014, he signed with Virtus Bologna for the 2014–15 season. On March 11, 2015, he signed a two-year contract extension with Virtus. On March 31, 2016, he parted ways with Virtus. In 2015–16 season, he played only six games due to an injury.

On October 30, 2016, he signed with Amici Pallacanestro Udinese of the Italian Serie A2 Basket. On March 30, 2017, he parted ways with Udinese. On April 3, 2017, he signed with Turkish club TED Ankara Kolejliler for the rest of the 2016–17 BSL season.

On December 4, 2017, Ray signed with Byblos Club of the Lebanese Basketball League.

== Career statistics ==
Legend
GP	Games played	GS	Games started	MPG	Minutes per game
FG%	Field goal percentage	3P%	3-point field goal percentage	FT%	Free throw percentage
RPG	Rebounds per game	APG	Assists per game	SPG	Steals per game
BPG	Blocks per game	PPG	Points per game	**Bold**	Career high

=== NBA ===
Year	Team	GP	GS	MPG	FG%	3P%	FT%	RPG	APG	SPG	BPG	PPG
2006–07	Boston	47	5	15.1	.386	.414	.764	1.5	.9	.4	.1	6.2
Career		47	5	15.1	.386	.414	.764	1.5	.9	.4	.1	6.2
