= Norm Roberts =

American basketball coach (born 1965)

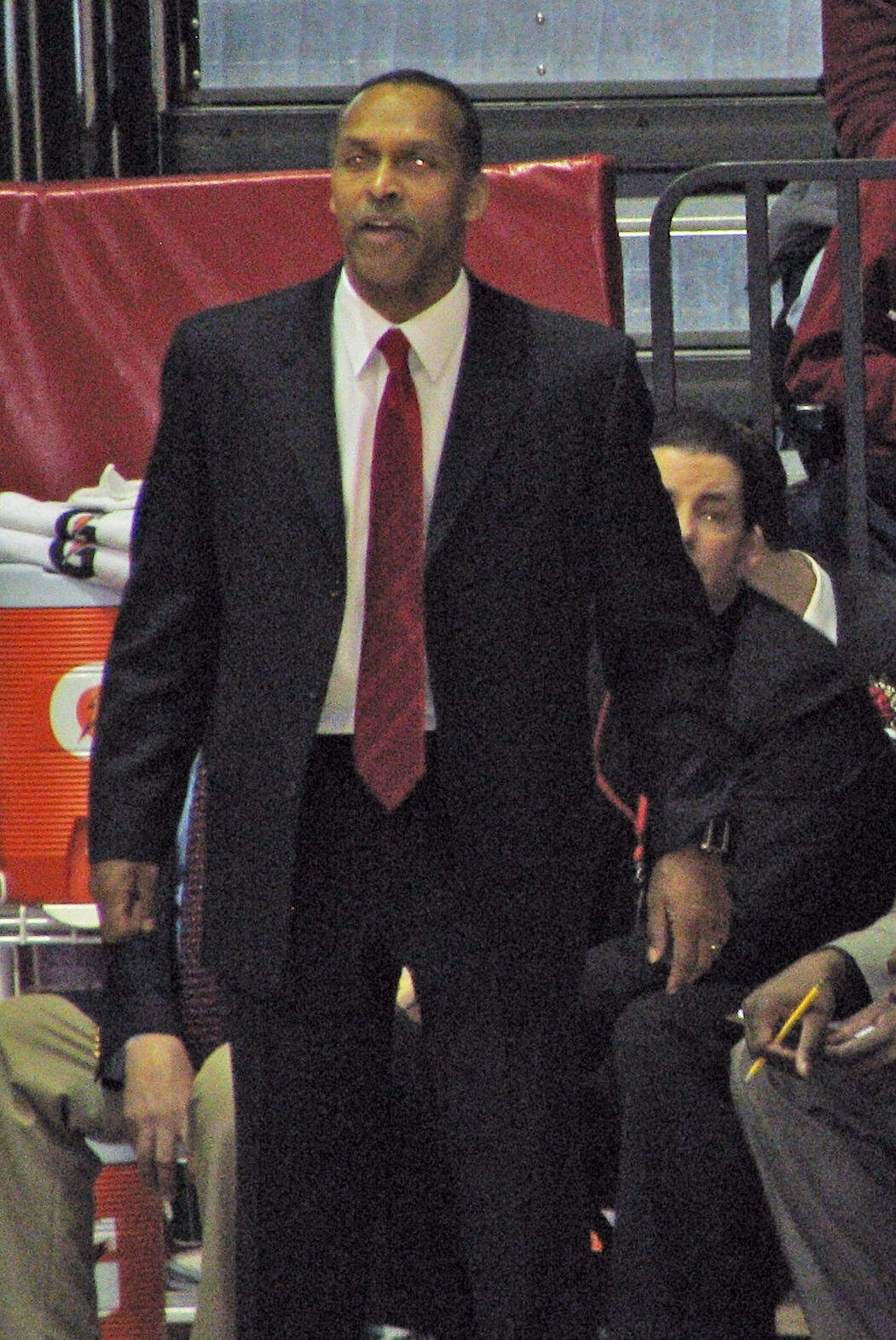
- Roberts coaching St. John's in 2009

Biographical details
- Born: July 21, 1965 (age 61); Queens, New York, U.S.

Playing career
- 1983–1987: Queens (NY)

Coaching career (HC unless noted)
- 1991–1995: Queens (NY)
- 1995–1997: Oral Roberts (assistant)
- 1997–2000: Tulsa (assistant)
- 2000–2003: Illinois (assistant)
- 2003–2004: Kansas (assistant)
- 2004–2010: St. John's
- 2011–2012: Florida (assistant)
- 2012–2025: Kansas (assistant)

Head coaching record
- Overall: 109–185
- Tournaments: 0–1 (NIT); 0–1 (CBI)

Accomplishments and honors

Championships
- NCAA Division I Tournament (2022)

Norman Roberts (born July 21, 1965) is a former men's college basketball coach who was most recently an assistant coach at the University of Kansas. He also is the former head coach at St. John's University.

== Early life ==
Roberts attended Springfield Gardens High School, where he was a teammate of Anthony Mason.

== Coaching career ==
Roberts's first coaching opportunity came when Jack Curran hired him as coach of the freshman team at Archbishop Molloy High School. In 1991 Roberts became head coach at Queens College, a position he held until 1995. Prior to the 1996–97 season, Roberts was hired by then-Oral Roberts head coach Bill Self. Roberts followed Self to the University of Tulsa (in 1998), University of Illinois (in 2000) and University of Kansas (in 2003). On April 13, 2004, he signed a five-year contract to coach the men's basketball team at St. John's University. His assistants included Glenn Braica, Chris Casey, and Fred Quartlebaum. In April 2012 Roberts returned to the University of Kansas as an assistant coach, filling the position left by Danny Manning.

=== St. John's ===
On April 13, 2004, Roberts signed a five-year contract to coach the men's basketball team at St. John's University. Although Roberts was thought of as a longshot, school officials were impressed by his work as Self's top recruiter over the past four years. Additionally, he was a New York City native, and it was hoped he would rebuild the Red Storm's traditional pipeline to the area's rich pool of high school basketball players. Historically, St. John's has been known for fielding powerhouse teams built mainly on New York City talent. He succeeded Kevin Clark, who served as the interim coach after Mike Jarvis, who was fired midway through the 2003–04 season.

Roberts was fired by St. John's on March 19, 2010, after the Red Storm lost in the first round of the 2010 NIT. In 2011, Florida coach Billy Donovan hired Roberts as an assistant coach.

=== Florida ===
Roberts served as an assistant coach for Florida for one season.

=== Kansas ===
Roberts was hired by Kansas in 2012 as an assistant. He won his first national championship in the 2021–22 season. The following season, while head coach Bill Self served a 4-game suspension for recruiting violations, he served as acting head coach. He went 4–0 in the games he was acting head coach. Later that season, after Self was hospitalized, Roberts also coached the Jayhawks in the 2023 Big 12 Tournament and the NCAA Tournament due to Self's health issues.

On May 5, 2025, Roberts announced his retirement after 37 years of coaching, including 14 with Kansas.

== Family ==
Roberts and his wife have two sons. Both of his sons played Division I basketball; Niko played at Kansas as an invited walk-on and Justin played at Niagara.

== Head coaching record ==
Record table
Season	Team	Overall	Conference	Standing	Postseason
Queens Knights (East Coast Conference) (1991–1995)
1991–92	Queens	6–21	2–16		
1992–93	Queens	8–19	7–11		
1993–94	Queens	4–23	2–20		
1994–95	Queens	6–21	4–18		
Queens:		24–84	15–65		
St. John's Red Storm (Big East Conference) (2004–2010)
2004–05	St. John's	9–18	3–13	13th	
2005–06	St. John's	12–15	5–11	T–13th	
2006–07	St. John's	16–15	7–9	11th	
2007–08	St. John's	11–19	5–13	14th	
2008–09	St. John's	16–18	6–12	13th	CBI First Round
2009–10	St. John's	17–16	6–12	13th	NIT First Round
St. John's:		81–101	32–70		
Kansas Jayhawks (Big 12 Conference) (2022–2023)
2022–23	Kansas*	4–0	0–0	N/A	
Kansas:		4–0	0–0		
Total:		109–185			

*Served as acting head coach for 4 games while head Bill Self served a suspension.
