= John DeGroat =

American basketball player

Personal information
- Born: January 7, 1985 (age 41) Albany, New York, U.S.
- Listed height: 6 ft 6 in (1.98 m)
- Listed weight: 220 lb (100 kg)

Career information
- High school: Monticello (Monticello, New York)
- College: Northeastern JC (2002–2004); Pittsburgh (2004–2006)
- NBA draft: 2006: undrafted
- Playing career: 2006–2017
- Position: Forward
- Coaching career: 2021–present

Career history

Playing
- 2006: Killester
- 2006: Korihait
- 2006–2007: Dombovar
- 2007–2008: Pittsburgh Xplosion
- 2008–2009: Budivelnyk
- 2009–2011: Odesa
- 2011: Club La Unión
- 2011–2012: Olímpico
- 2012–2014: Boca Juniors
- 2014: Fuerza Regia de Monterrey
- 2014–2016: San Martín de Corrientes
- 2016–2017: Instituto ACC

Coaching
- 2021–2022: IUP (assistant)
- 2022–present: South Kent School (assistant)

Career highlights
- CBA All-Star (2008); All-CBA Second Team (2008)

John Franklin DeGroat (born January 7, 1985) is an American basketball coach and former professional player. He played college basketball for the Northeastern JC Plainsmen and Pittsburgh Panthers. DeGroat was a Continental Basketball Association (CBA) All-Star and All-CBA Second Team selection as a member of the Pittsburgh Xplosion in 2008. He also played in Ireland, Finland, Hungary, Italy, Ukraine and Argentina. DeGroat has been an assistant basketball coach at South Kent School since 2022.

== Early life ==
DeGroat was born on January 7, 1985, in Albany, New York. His mother, Valancy DeGroat, was too young to raise him while his father, Leon Gayle, did not know he existed until he was a teenager; he has 15 siblings through his parents. DeGroat lived with his great aunt and was raised in Newburgh. He was rebellious as a child which he attributed to not being around his birth parents. DeGroat's behavior led to him being placed in a group home for wayward youths in Yonkers. He was adopted by Thomas and Deborah Mack of Monticello when he was aged 12. His adopted sister, Katina Mack, played college basketball for the Penn State Lady Lions.

DeGroat played organized basketball for the first time during the ninth grade at Monticello High School. He averaged 24.5 points and 13.5 rebounds per game as a senior.

== College career ==
DeGroat started his college basketball career at Northeastern Junior College. He committed to play for the Pittsburgh Panthers in 2003. DeGroat played sparingly during his first season at Pittsburgh in 2004–05. He averaged 2.9 points in 10.7 minutes per game as a senior during the 2005–06 season.

== Professional career ==
DeGroat split his rookie professional season on teams in Ireland, Finland and Hungary. He returned to Pittsburgh in 2007 to play for the Pittsburgh Xplosion of the Continental Basketball Association (CBA). DeGroat averaged 18.2 points and 8 rebounds. He was selected as a CBA All-Star and named to the All-CBA Second Team.

DeGroat also played professionally in Italy, Ukraine and Uruguay. He spent the last five seasons of his playing career in Argentina.

== Coaching career ==
DeGroat was an assistant coach for the IUP Crimson Hawks during the 2021–22 season. He joined South Kent School as the assistant prep basketball coach and head development team coach in 2022.
