= Daryll Hill =

American basketball player

Personal information
- Born: July 31, 1982 (age 44) Queens, New York, U.S.
- Listed height: 6 ft 1 in (1.85 m)
- Listed weight: 175 lb (79 kg)

Career information
- High school: Cardozo (Queens, New York); Milford Academy (Milford, Connecticut)
- College: St. John's (2003–2007)
- NBA draft: 2007: undrafted
- Position: Point guard

Career history
- 2007–2008: MZT Skopje
- 2008–2009: Albany Patroons
- 2009: Laval Kebs

Daryll Hill (born July 31, 1982) is an American former basketball player from Queens, New York.

He played at Cardozo High School in Bayside, Queens. He went on to play basketball at St. John's University in Jamaica, Queens. At St. John's he led the Big East Conference in scoring for one season. He's known as "Showtime Hill" due to his flashy moves while also playing at the Rucker Park streetball tournament.

He had a tryout with the New York Knicks, but has never played in the NBA. He played with the Albany Patroons during the 2008–2009 CBA season. He played 10 games with the Patroons averaging 2.5 assists per game and 5.9 points per game.
