= Curtis Sumpter =

American basketball player

Personal information
- Born: January 30, 1984 (age 42) Brooklyn, New York, U.S.
- Listed height: 6 ft 7 in (2.01 m)
- Listed weight: 225 lb (102 kg)

Career information
- High school: Bishop Loughlin (Brooklyn, New York)
- College: Villanova (2002–2007)
- NBA draft: 2007: undrafted
- Playing career: 2007–2012
- Position: Small forward
- Coaching career: 2013–present

Career history

Playing
- 2007–2008: Köln 99ers
- 2008: JA Vichy
- 2008–2009: Roanne Basket
- 2009: BCM Gravelines
- 2009–2010: Dexia Mons-Hainaut
- 2010–2011: JA Vichy
- 2011: Maroussi
- 2011–2012: Tulsa 66ers

Coaching
- 2013–2016: Philadelphia 76ers (assistant)

Career highlights
- First-team All-Big East (2007); Fourth-team Parade All-American (2002)
Medals
Men's basketball
Representing United States
Pan American Games
Bronze medal – third place	2011 Guadalajara	National team
FIBA Americas U20 Championship
Gold medal – first place	2004 Halifax	National team

Curtis Sumpter (born January 30, 1984) is an American professional basketball player currently working as an assistant coach for the Delaware 87ers of the NBA G League.

A 6'7" forward from Brooklyn, New York, Sumpter was named to the All-Big East second team, and the first team All-Philadelphia Big Five in the 2004–05 season. He averaged 15.3 points per game and 7.2 rebounds, helping to lead Villanova to the Sweet 16. After being red-shirted during the 2005–06 season with a knee injury, Sumpter returned to the Wildcats' lineup for the 2006–07 season and earned first team All-Big East honors.

On August 14, 2007, Sumpter signed with German team Köln 99ers.
