= Gerry McNamara =

American basketball player and coach (born 1983)

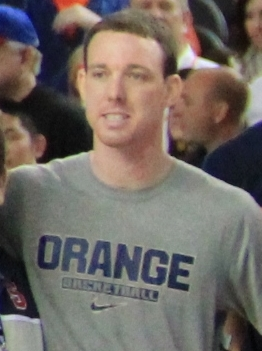
- McNamara in 2013

Current position
- Title: Head coach
- Team: Syracuse
- Conference: ACC
- Record: 4–2 (.667)

Biographical details
- Born: August 28, 1983 (age 43); Scranton, Pennsylvania, U.S.

Playing career
- 2002–2006: Syracuse
- Position: Guard

Coaching career (HC unless noted)
- 2009–2011: Syracuse (graduate manager)
- 2011–2023: Syracuse (assistant)
- 2023–2024: Syracuse (associate HC)
- 2024–2026: Siena
- 2026–present: Syracuse

Head coaching record
- Overall: 41–32 (.562)
- Tournaments: 0–1 (NCAA Division I)

Accomplishments and honors

Championships
- NCAA champion (2003); MAAC tournament (2026)

Awards
- Chip Hilton Player of the Year (2006); 2× First-team All-Big East (2005, 2006); Second-team All-Big East (2004); No. 3 retired by Syracuse Orange; Fourth-team Parade All-American (2002)
Medal record
Men's basketball
Representing United States
Summer Universiade
Gold medal – first place	2005 Izmir	Team competition

Gerard Thomas McNamara (born August 28, 1983) is an American former basketball player and current head coach for Syracuse. He was an associate head coach at Syracuse before becoming the head coach of Siena, a position he held from 2024 to 2026; he then returned to Syracuse as its head coach at the beginning of the 2026 offseason. A former guard for the Orange, he never missed a start in his career which lasted from 2002 to 2006. McNamara helped lead the team to the 2003 national title.

After graduating from Syracuse, McNamara played professionally for Panionios BC, Olympiacos BC, the Bakersfield Jam, BK Ventspils, and the Reno Bighorns. In 2009, McNamara announced his retirement as a player and returned to Syracuse as a graduate student and assistant coach.

== Early life and high school career ==
McNamara was born in Scranton, Pennsylvania. He is the youngest of the four children of Joyce and Gerard McNamara.

McNamara attended Bishop Hannan High School (Now Holy Cross High School) under head coach John Bucci. In his four seasons at Hannan, the Golden Lancers compiled a record of 109–17. McNamara was named the Lackawanna League Division II Player of the Year for four years in a row, was a three-time Associated Press Pennsylvania Small School All-State First Team selection and was the AP's Pennsylvania State Player of the Year in 2001 and 2002. McNamara finished as Pennsylvania's seventh all-time leading scorer with 2,917 points. He still holds the scoring record at Holy Cross.

Bishop Hannan advanced to the Pennsylvania Interscholastic Athletic Association Class A championship game after defeating Susquehanna Community High School of Susquehanna, Pennsylvania, in the semi-finals of his freshman year. The team also went to the finals his sophomore season and finished the state runner-up in both 1999 and 2000 to Kennedy Christian High School of Hermitage, Pennsylvania.

After and before (but not during) the 1999 and 2000 seasons, Bishop Hannan was named under the AA class of PIAA. After McNamara graduated in 2002, the school, and all the neighboring Bishop schools except Bishop Hoban, went back to A for population reasons. In 2007, when the school combined with Bishop O'Hara of Dunmore, Pennsylvania, the new school called Holy Cross High School, was put in the AA class.

In 2001 the Golden Lancers were defeated by eventual PIAA Class AA champion Trinity High School of Camp Hill, Pennsylvania, in the Eastern Final.

In 2002 Bishop Hannan and Trinity met once again in the Eastern Final. McNamara exploded for a career-high 55 points (41 in the first half), putting him in 2nd place for the most points scored in a basketball game in PIAA history, as the Golden Lancers advanced to the Class AA championship game, 83–76. Three days later his 32 points led all scorers as Hannan held off Sto-Rox High School and won the Class AA state title, 70–68.

Following his senior season, McNamara was named the 2002 Pennsylvania Gatorade Player of the Year and a fourth-team Parade Magazine All-American. For his high school accomplishments, McNamara was also named the 20th greatest athlete in Scranton-area history by the Scranton Times in 2004.

== College career ==
McNamara had offers from schools such as Duke and Florida, but chose to attend Syracuse.

=== 2002–03 season ===
McNamara helped Syracuse win its first Basketball National Championship in 2003. McNamara started every game in his freshman year, helping lead the Orange to a 30–5 record, including a perfect 17–0 at home. He averaged 13 points, 4.6 assists and 2.2 steals a game while shooting 35 percent from 3-point range and 91 percent from the foul line.

McNamara showed early on that he was a clutch performer, nailing a game-winning 3-pointer as then-No. 17 Syracuse notched an 82–80 win over then-No. 10 Notre Dame in February. In a March game at Georgetown, McNamara missed a free-throw with 10 seconds left that allowed the Hoyas to force overtime. Until that point, McNamara had been a perfect 41-for-41 in conference play. However, McNamara made up for his miss, hitting two 3-pointers and adding another jumper in an 11–3 run to start overtime as Syracuse beat Mike Sweetney and the Georgetown Hoyas, 93–84. Ten of McNamara's 22 came in overtime.

In the NCAA Tournament second-round game against Oklahoma State, McNamara scored 14 points and added six assists as the Orangemen overcame a 13-point first-half deficit. In the semi-final game against T. J. Ford and the University of Texas, the Orangemen won 95–84 behind a career-high 33 points from Carmelo Anthony and 19 points and four steals from McNamara.

In the title game versus favored University of Kansas, his six three-pointers during the first half shootout helped propel Syracuse to an 18-point lead over the Jayhawks. In the second half, Kansas used a pressing defense to throttle the Syracuse offense. The Orange held off a furious Kansas comeback, eventually winning the game 81–78 behind the stellar play of freshman star Carmelo Anthony and a game-saving blocked shot by sophomore forward Hakim Warrick. McNamara and Anthony were named to the All-Tournament team.

=== 2003–04 season ===
McNamara and Warrick were left to guide the team in the 2003–2004 season after Anthony rode his heralded postseason play into the NBA. McNamara would not disappoint, averaging 17.2 points per game. He was also a Wooden and Naismith award candidate and Second Team All-Big East selection. McNamara and Warrick led the Orange to a 23–8 record and a five seed in the NCAA Tournament. McNamara scored 43 points, including a school-record nine three-point shots, as Syracuse outlasted Brigham Young University 80–75 in the tournament's first round.

Syracuse built a 16-point lead over the University of Maryland in the second round; they survived a furious Terrapins comeback in the 72–70 win. In the Sweet 16 McNamara had a game-high 24 points, but Syracuse could not overcome the University of Alabama, 80–71. McNamara averaged 26.7 points in the three tournament games.

=== 2004–05 season ===
In 2005, Syracuse finished 27–7 and captured the Big East post-season tournament title with a win over West Virginia University. McNamara averaged 15.8 points and was named to the First Team All-Big East. The fourth-seeded Orange suffered a shocking overtime upset in the first round of the NCAA Tournament to the University of Vermont. McNamara struggled through one of the worst games of his college career, scoring just 11 points and missing 14 of his 18 shots.

=== 2005–06 season ===
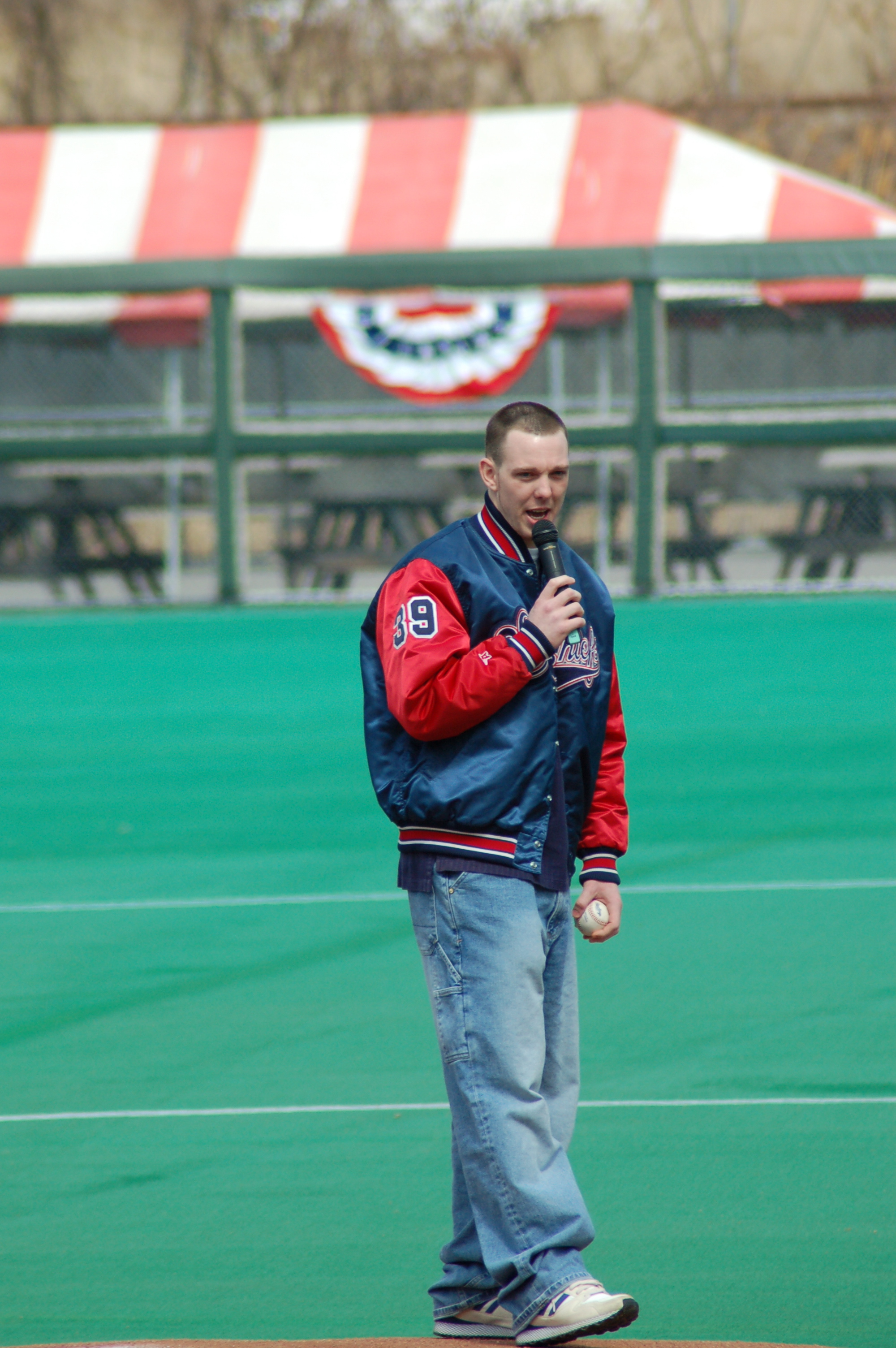
McNamara in April 2006

As one of only two players left from the championship team, McNamara and Syracuse struggled through the 2005–2006 regular season. Two highlights were the 38 points McNamara scored against Davidson College, the second-most points ever scored by a Syracuse player at the team's home arena, the Carrier Dome, and a 30-point performance against the visiting Louisville Cardinals. Syracuse finished with a losing record in the Big East; the team was in danger of missing the NCAA Tournament unless it secured the conference's automatic bid by winning the Big East's postseason tournament.

Prior to the conference tournament two separate publications, Sports Illustrated and the Syracuse Post-Standard conducted polls of Big East players and assistant coaches. In each poll, McNamara was voted the Big East's "Most Overrated" player.

Fueled by the negative press, and despite an injured leg, McNamara led Syracuse on a run to the Big East tournament title. In the first round he hit a running one-handed three-point shot with less than a second left in the game to spur Syracuse past the University of Cincinnati, 74–73. Following the game, head coach Jim Boeheim unleashed a passionate profanity laced defense of his star player to the attending media.

The next day McNamara hit a three-pointer in the closing seconds of regulation to tie number-one ranked University of Connecticut and eventually led Syracuse to an overtime upset. McNamara finished with 17 points and 13 assists, one assist shy of the Big East Tournament record.

Syracuse fell behind Georgetown University in the tournament's semi-finals, Syracuse's third game in three days. McNamara hit five three-pointers in the second half—including one in the last minute of the game—to slash the Hoyas' lead to one. He dished out an assist to freshman guard Eric Devendorf to put Syracuse in the lead following a Georgetown turnover and forced another turnover in the closing seconds to clinch the game.

McNamara had 14 points and 6 assists in Syracuse's 65–61 championship game win over the University of Pittsburgh. Syracuse became the first team to win four games in four days and capture the Big East Tournament Championship.

McNamara won the Dave Gavitt Award as the tournament's Most Outstanding Player. He donned a tee-shirt with the mocking retort, "Overrated?!!" as he helped cut down the nets.

McNamara's career came to an unceremonious end in the first round of the 2006 NCAA Tournament. Severely hobbled by his leg injury and exhausted from the run in the Big East tournament, he scored only two points in just 23 minutes of play as fifth-seeded Syracuse was upset by Texas A&M University. It marked the only game in his career McNamara was held without a field goal. The Orange finished with a 23–12 record.

=== Career summary ===
McNamara started all 135 games he played in his four years and graduated with a degree in Communication and Rhetorical Studies in May 2006. A 2006 Associated Press Honorable Mention All-American, McNamara was named by Big East head coaches to the league's All-Freshman team in 2003, to the All-Big East second team in 2004 and to the All-Big East first team in 2005 and 2006.

His career statistics rank among the greats in Syracuse's school history. He finished fourth in points scored (2,099), first in minutes played (4781), second in steals (258), third in assists (648), first in three-point shots made (400) and attempted (1,131), and first in career free-throw percentage (89.1%).

In 63 career Big East games, McNamara set conference records for three-pointers made (183) and career free-throw percentage (91.7%). His 400 career three-pointers ranked sixth all-time in NCAA history. As of the 2022–23 edition of the NCAA Record book it remained in the NCAA Division I all-time top 25 (21st) and his overall career free-throw percentage (435–490=88.8%) remained in the NCAA Division I top 25 (18th).

McNamara was also named the 2006 winner of the Chip Hilton Player of the Year Award. The award is presented annually by the Naismith Memorial Basketball Hall of Fame to a senior Division I men's player who demonstrates outstanding character, leadership, and talent.

McNamara left Syracuse as one of the most beloved players in Orange basketball history; his final regular-season game at the Carrier Dome on March 5, 2006, was the arena's first-ever advance sellout for a basketball game. The final attendance of 33,633, at that time an all-time NCAA record for an on-campus regular-season game, included more than 3,000 fans—dubbed "McNamara's Band" by the media—from the Scranton area (according to media reports more than 60 buses made the two-hour trip from Scranton to Syracuse for the game). Among those people coming up from Scranton were McNamara's parents, who were in attendance for every game in his college career. Syracuse lost the game to highly ranked Villanova University; McNamara led all scorers with 29 points.

McNamara's popularity continues to this date, as he can be seen in local television advertisements in Central New York area. On August 16, 2006, The Scranton/Wilkes-Barre Red Barons, Triple-A affiliate of the Philadelphia Phillies, gave the first 6,000 fans through the gates at PNC Field a Gerry McNamara bobblehead doll. The doll was featured on the Scranton-set television show The Office, placed on the desk of the character of Dwight Schrute.

In March 2023, Syracuse University officially retired his #3 jersey alongside his teammate Hakim Warrick.

=== Career statistics ===
Year	GP	Min	Pts	FG%	FT%	3P%	Rebs	Asts	Stls	Blocks	TOs	PFs
2002–03	35	36.2	13.3	40.1	90.9	35.7	2.3	4.4	2.4	0.1	2.5	1.9
2003–04	31	36.2	17.2	38.5	87.2	38.9	2.6	3.8	1.7	0.0	2.5	2.1
2004–05	34	35.6	15.8	37.0	87.4	34.0	2.3	4.9	1.9	0.1	2.9	1.8
2005–06	35	35.2	16.0	35.3	90.2	33.4	2.7	5.9	1.9	0.1	3.3	1.3
TOTALS	135	35.5	15.5	37.5	88.8	35.4	2.5	4.8	1.9	0.1	2.8	1.7

== Professional career ==
Before he graduated from Syracuse University, McNamara was drafted No. 1 overall in the 2006 United States Basketball League draft held on April 11, 2006, by the Northeast Pennsylvania Breakers. However, McNamara decided not to sign with the Breakers and instead focused on the upcoming 2006 NBA draft by participating in the annual NBA Pre-Draft Camp. Despite being projected as a second round pick in some mock drafts, McNamara was not drafted. However, he was invited to participate in the Orlando Pro Summer League in Orlando, Florida playing for the Orlando Magic. At the conclusion of the league, McNamara was not offered a contract with the Magic.

On September 4, 2006, he signed a one-year contract to play for Olympiacos BC, but only for 2006–07 Euroleague games. After playing just 30 seconds in the team's first five games, it is estimated he was paid $90,000 for that one minute. While he was in Greece, McNamara was drafted in the sixth round of the Continental Basketball Association draft by the Albany Patroons on September 26, 2006. The Patroons held McNamara's rights until 2008. McNamara reached a contract settlement and left the team and returned to the United States in November 2006.

On December 12, 2006, in an attempt to boost his chances of playing in the NBA, McNamara signed with the Bakersfield Jam, an NBA Development League team located in Bakersfield, California. In doing so, he gave up a significant amount of money by leaving Olympiakos. McNamara was named as a reserve to the Western Conference's All-Star team and played in the Gillette D-League All-Star Game on February 17, 2007, in Las Vegas. He scored two points and recorded 5 assists. He finished the 2006–2007 season averaging 10.8 points and 5.2 assists in 41 games.

On June 29, 2007, McNamara was invited to try out for the Philadelphia 76ers' summer league team. Despite a sprained ankle he made the team and played in both Las Vegas and Utah summer leagues.

After not being offered a contract by the 76ers, McNamara decided to return to Greece by signing a $400,000 contract on August 21, 2007, to play for the Greek team Panionios BC for the Greek A1 League 2007–08 season. He played his last game for the team on November 6, 2007, and was let go the next day, just four games into the season. McNamara played three of the four games and scored just seven points. Coincidentally, he was replaced on the roster by former Michigan State University star Mateen Cleaves with whom he shared minutes on the Bakersfield Jam team the prior season.

On February 15, 2008, McNamara signed a contract with Latvian basketball team BK Ventspils. After his brief stint in Latvia, McNamara returned to the U.S. after being invited to participate in the Utah Jazz's training camp on September 17, 2008, but McNamara was waived on October 27, 2008, after appearing in four preseason games.

On January 7, 2009, McNamara signed with the NBA Development League's Reno Bighorns, joining him with former Syracuse stars Damone Brown and Donté Greene. Three days later, McNamara made his debut against his former team, the Bakersfield Jam, and scored six points and recorded 6 assists in a 93–91 victory. However, on March 7, 2009, McNamara was waived by the Reno Bighorns citing personal reasons, and it was reported that McNamara was considering ending his playing career.

== National team career ==
McNamara was one of 13 players who accepted invitations to attend the 2005 USA Basketball men's trials and training camp from July 28 – August 4, 2005. The team, coached by Villanova's Jay Wright, won the gold medal at the World University Games in Izmir, Turkey.

McNamara played in all eight games and started four as the U.S. went a perfect 8–0. In those games, he averaged 8.4 points, 1.9 rebounds and a squad-best 2.6 assists per game. McNamara finished off the tournament with 13 points and five rebounds to help the Americans win the gold-medal game over previously unbeaten Ukraine, 85–70.

== Coaching career ==
On July 22, 2009, it was announced that McNamara would be returning to Syracuse University as a graduate student. He enrolled as a Master of Science candidate in the School of Education's Instructional Design, Development and Evaluation program. In addition to taking classes, McNamara joined the basketball team's coaching staff as a graduate manager. In November 2011, following the dismissal of associate head basketball coach Bernie Fine in response to allegations of child sexual abuse, McNamara was promoted to assistant coach, with a focus on development of the guards. On March 15, 2023, following Adrian Autry's promotion to head coach for Syracuse due to Boeheim's retirement, McNamara was promoted to associate head coach by Autry.

=== Siena (2024–2026) ===
On March 29, 2024, McNamara was named the 19th men's head basketball coach in Siena history. In McNamara's second year as head coach at Siena, he led the Saints to a MAAC tournament championship, clinching the conference's automatic bid to the NCAA tournament. As the 16 seed in the East region, Siena faced the top overall seed Duke Blue Devils in the first round. Despite entering the contest as massive underdogs, the Saints nearly pulled off a historic upset in the first round, jumping out to a 43–32 lead at halftime before ultimately losing 71–65. McNamara finished with a 37-30 record over his two seasons with the Saints.

=== Syracuse (2026–present) ===
On March 22, 2026, it was reported that McNamara was finalizing a deal to return to Syracuse as their head coach. McNamara would become the ninth head coach in Syracuse program history.

== Personal life ==
He has a brother, Timothy, and two sisters, Bridget and Maureen. He married Katie Marie Stott on July 21, 2007.

== Head coaching record ==
Record table
Season	Team	Overall	Conference	Standing	Postseason
Siena Saints (Metro Atlantic Athletic Conference) (2024–2026)
2024–25	Siena	14–18	9–11	T–8th	
2025–26	Siena	23–12	13–7	3rd	NCAA Division I Round of 64
Siena:		37–30 (.552)	22–18 (.550)		
Syracuse Orange (ACC) (2026–present)
2026–27	Syracuse	4–2	0–0		
Syracuse:		4–2 (.667)	0–0 (–)		
Total:		41–32 (.562)			
National champion Postseason invitational champion Conference regular season champion Conference regular season and conference tournament champion Division regular season champion Division regular season and conference tournament champion Conference tournament champion
