= 2004–05 Duke Blue Devils men's basketball team =

American college basketball season

2004–05 Duke Blue Devils men's basketball

ACC tournament champions

NCAA tournament, Sweet Sixteen
- Conference: Atlantic Coast Conference

Ranking
- Coaches: No. 7
- AP: No. 3
- Record: 27–6 (11–5 ACC)
- Head coach: Mike Krzyzewski (25th season)
- Home arena: Cameron Indoor Stadium

2004–05 ACC men's basketball standings
	Conf.				Overall
Team	W		L	PCT	W		L	PCT
No. 2 North Carolina	14	–	2	.875	33	–	4	.892
No. 5 Wake Forest	13	–	3	.813	27	–	6	.818
No. 3 Duke†	11	–	5	.688	27	–	6	.818
Virginia Tech	8	–	8	.500	16	–	14	.533
No. 25 Georgia Tech	8	–	8	.500	20	–	12	.625
Miami (FL)	7	–	9	.438	16	–	13	.552
NC State	7	–	9	.438	21	–	14	.600
Maryland	7	–	9	.438	19	–	13	.594
Clemson	5	–	11	.313	16	–	16	.500
Florida State	4	–	12	.250	14	–	15	.483
Virginia	4	–	12	.250	14	–	15	.483
† 2005 ACC tournament winner Rankings from AP Poll

The 2004–05 Duke Blue Devils men's basketball team represented Duke University during the 2004-05 men's college basketball season. Mike Krzyzewski had turned down a $40 million offer in the offseason to become the head coach of the Los Angeles Lakers to return for his 25th season and rebuild a team that lost Chris Duhon to graduation, Luol Deng to the pros and recruit Shaun Livingston altogether for the NBA draft. For the first time in five years, Duke was not picked to win the ACC.

== Roster ==
Name	Number	Position	Height	Weight	Year	Hometown
Patrick Davidson	41	G	6–1	190	Sophomore	Melbourne, Arkansas
Sean Dockery	15	G	6–2	185	Junior	Chicago, Illinois
Daniel Ewing	5	G	6–3	185	Senior	Houston, Texas
Patrick Johnson	51	C	6–9	250	Senior	Atlanta, Georgia
Reggie Love	30	F	6–4	225	Senior	Charlotte, North Carolina
David McClure	14	F	6–6	215	Freshman	Ridgefield, Connecticut
Lee Melchionni	13	F	6–6	205	Junior	Lancaster, Pennsylvania
DeMarcus Nelson	21	G	6–4	200	Freshman	Elk Grove, California
Tom Novick	50	F	6–6	190	Sophomore	Charlotte, North Carolina
Joe Pagliuca	45	G	6–2	185	Sophomore	Weston, Massachusetts
Ross Perkins	40	G	6–4	200	Junior	Greensboro, North Carolina
Shavlik Randolph	42	F	6–10	240	Junior	Raleigh, North Carolina
JJ Redick	4	G	6–4	190	Junior	Roanoke, Virginia
Shelden Williams	23	F	6–9	250	Junior	Forest Park, Oklahoma

== Schedule ==
Date time, TV	Rank^{#}	Opponent^{#}	Result	Record	Site (attendance) city, state
Exhibition
November 5		St. Francis/Xavier (Canada)	W 107–56		Cameron Indoor Stadium; Durham, NC
November 11		North Carolina Central	W 95–58		Cameron Indoor Stadium; Durham, NC
Regular season
November 20*	No. 11	UT Martin	W 88–46	1–0	Cameron Indoor Stadium; Durham, NC
November 22*	No. 11	vs. Davidson	W 74–61	2–0	Charlotte Coliseum; Charlotte, NC
November 27*	No. 9	UNC Greensboro	W 98–44	3–0	Cameron Indoor Stadium; Durham, NC
November 30*	No. 10	No. 11 Michigan State; ACC–Big Ten Challenge	W 81–74	4–0	Cameron Indoor Stadium; Durham, NC
December 4*	No. 10	vs. Valparaiso	W 93–61	5–0	United Center; Chicago, IL
December 12*	No. 9	Toledo	W 82–54	6–0	Cameron Indoor Stadium; Durham, NC
December 14*	No. 7	UIC	W 88–55	7–0	Cameron Indoor Stadium; Durham, NC
December 18*; 5:00 p.m., CBS	No. 7	vs. Oklahoma; Dreyfus Classic	W 78–67	8–0	Madison Square Garden; New York, NY
January 2	No. 6	Clemson	W 62–54	9–0 (1–0)	Cameron Indoor Stadium; Durham, NC
January 5*	No. 5	Princeton	W 59–46	10–0	Cameron Indoor Stadium; Durham, NC
January 8*	No. 5	Temple	W 82–74	11–0	Cameron Indoor Stadium; Durham, NC
January 13	No. 5	at NC State	W 86–74	12–0 (2–0)	RBC Center; Raleigh, NC
January 16	No. 5	Virginia	W 80–66	13–0 (3–0)	Cameron Indoor Stadium; Durham, NC
January 19	No. 4	at Miami	W 92–83	14–0 (4–0)	BankUnited Center; Coral Gables, FL
January 22	No. 4	at Florida State	W 88–56	15–0 (5–0)	Donald L. Tucker Center; Tallahassee, FL
January 26	No. 2	Maryland	L 66–75	15–1 (5–1)	Cameron Indoor Stadium; Durham, NC
January 30	No. 2	Virginia Tech	W 100–65	16–1 (6–1)	Cameron Indoor Stadium; Durham, NC
February 2	No. 4	at No. 7 Wake Forest	L 89–92	16–2 (6–2)	Lawrence Joel Veterans Memorial Coliseum; Winston-Salem, NC
February 5 CBS	No. 4	No. 25 Georgia Tech	W 82–65	17–2 (7–2)	Cameron Indoor Stadium; Durham, NC
February 9	No. 7	No. 2 North Carolina; Carolina–Duke rivalry	W 71–70	18–2 (8–2)	Cameron Indoor Stadium; Durham, NC
February 12	No. 7	at Maryland; College GameDay	L 92–99	18–3 (8–3)	Comcast Center; College Park, MD
February 17	No. 7	at Virginia Tech	L 65–67	18–4 (8–4)	Cassell Coliseum; Blacksburg, VA
February 20; FSN	No. 7	No. 5 Wake Forest	W 102–92	19–4 (9–4)	Cameron Indoor Stadium; Durham, NC
February 23	No. 7	at Georgia Tech	W 60–56	20–4 (10–4)	McCamish Pavilion; Atlanta, GA
February 26*; ABC	No. 7	at St. John's	W 58–47	21–4	Madison Square Garden; New York, NY
March 3	No. 6	Miami (FL)	W 83–59	22–4 (11–4)	Cameron Indoor Stadium; Durham, NC
March 6 CBS	No. 6	at No. 2 North Carolina; Carolina–Duke rivalry	L 73–75	22–5 (11–5)	Dean Smith Center; Chapel Hill, NC
ACC Tournament
March 11*; ESPN	No. 5	vs. Virginia; Quarterfinals	W 76–64	23–5	MCI Center; Washington, D.C.
March 12*; ESPN	No. 5	vs. NC State; Semifinals	W 76–69	24–5	MCI Center; Washington, D.C.
March 13*; ESPN	No. 5	vs. Georgia Tech; Final	W 69–64	25–5	MCI Center; Washington, D.C.
NCAA tournament
March 18*; CBS	No. 2	vs. Delaware State; First Round	W 57–46	26–5	Charlotte Coliseum; Charlotte, NC
March 20*; CBS	No. 2	vs. Mississippi State; Second Round	W 63–55	27–5	Charlotte Coliseum; Charlotte, NC
March 25*; CBS	No. 2	vs. No. 15 Michigan State; Sweet Sixteen	L 68–78	27–6	Frank Erwin Center; Austin, TX
*Non-conference game. ^{#}Rankings from AP Poll. (#) Tournament seedings in parentheses.
