= 2004–05 Western Kentucky Hilltoppers basketball team =

American college basketball season

2004–05 Western Kentucky Hilltoppers basketball

NIT Tournament, Second Round
- Conference: Sun Belt Conference
- East Division
- Record: 22–9 (9–5 Sun Belt)
- Head coach: Darrin Horn
- Assistant coaches: Paul Sanderford; William Small (2nd season)
- Home arena: E. A. Diddle Arena

2004–05 Sun Belt Conference men's basketball standings
	Conf.				Overall
Team	W		L	PCT	W		L	PCT
East
Little Rock	10	–	4	.714	18	–	10	.643
Western Kentucky	9	–	5	.643	22	–	9	.710
Middle Tennessee	7	–	7	.500	19	–	12	.613
Arkansas State	7	–	7	.500	16	–	13	.552
Florida International	4	–	10	.286	13	–	17	.433
West
Denver	12	–	3	.800	20	–	11	.645
Louisiana–Lafayette †	11	–	4	.733	20	–	11	.645
New Orleans	7	–	8	.467	13	–	17	.433
South Alabama	6	–	9	.400	10	–	18	.357
North Texas	6	–	9	.400	14	–	14	.500
New Mexico State	1	–	14	.067	6	–	24	.200
† 2005 Sun Belt Conference tournament winner Rankings from AP poll

The 2004–05 Western Kentucky Hilltoppers men's basketball team represented Western Kentucky University during the 2004–05 NCAA Division I men's basketball season. The Hilltoppers were led by head coach Darrin Horn and All Sun Belt Conference guard, Anthony Winchester. They finished 2nd in the SBC East Division and were invited to the 2005 National Invitation Tournament. Future NBA player Courtney Lee was SBC Freshman of the Year and was named to the SBC All Tournament team.

== Schedule ==
Date time, TV	Rank^{#}	Opponent^{#}	Result	Record	Site city, state
Regular Season
11/19/2004*		Tennessee State	W 76–73 ^{OT}	1–0	E. A. Diddle Arena (6,785); Bowling Green, KY
11/23/2004*		at Georgia	W 71–61	2–0	Stegeman Coliseum (6,217); Athens, GA
11/27/2004*		Montana	W 72–46	3–0	E. A. Diddle Arena (4,220); Bowling Green, KY
12/1/2004*		Southeast Missouri	W 74–53	4–0	E. A. Diddle Arena (3,882); Bowling Green, KY
12/4/2004*		at Murray State	W 82–72	5–0	CFSB Center (6,612); Murray, KY
12/8/2004*		Eastern Kentucky	W 75–63	6–0	E. A. Diddle Arena (6,478); Bowling Green, KY
12/11/2004*		at Evansville	L 62–68	6–1	Roberts Municipal Stadium (9,036); Evansville, IN
12/18/2004*		Marshall	W 70–54	7–1	E. A. Diddle Arena (4,367); Bowling Green, KY
12/22/2004*		Kentucky State	W 89–73	8–1	E. A. Diddle Arena (2,462); Bowling Green, KY
12/28/2004*		at Austin Peay	W 87–80	9–1	Dunn Center (3,300); Clarksville, TN
1/1/2005*		Fordham	W 80–59	10–1	E. A. Diddle Arena (4,240); Bowling Green, KY
1/5/2005*		at Virginia	L 79–80 ^{2OT}	10–2	University Hall (6,675); Charlottesville, VA
1/13/2005		at Arkansas–Little Rock	L 66–69	10–3 (0-1)	Alltel Arena (3,627); North Little Rock, AR
1/15/2005		at Arkansas State	L 90–94	10–4 (0-2)	Convocation Center (4,751); Jonesboro, AR
1/20/2005		New Orleans	W 81–69	11–4 (1-2)	E. A. Diddle Arena (4,418); Bowling Green, KY
1/22/2005		South Alabama	W 79–76 ^{OT}	12–4 (2-2)	E. A. Diddle Arena (5,564); Bowling Green, KY
1/27/2005		at Louisiana–Lafayette	L 76–91 ^{Vacated}	12–5 (2-3)	Cajundome (5,011); Lafayette, LA
1/29/2005		at New Mexico State	W 77–75	13–5 (3-3)	Pan American Center (4,571); Las Cruces, NM
02/3/2005		at Middle Tennessee	W 61–56	14–5 (4-3)	Murphy Center (6,103); Murfreesboro, TN
2/5/2005		Arkansas State	W 76–72	15–5 (5-3)	E. A. Diddle Arena (6,467); Bowling Green, KY
02/7/2005		FIU	W 83–67	16–5 (6-3)	E. A. Diddle Arena (3,717); Bowling Green, KY
02/10/2005		Denver	W 84–79	17–5 (7-3)	E. A. Diddle Arena (4,880); Bowling Green, KY
2/12/2005		at North Texas	W 93–92	18–5 (8-3)	UNT Coliseum (3,211); Denton, TX
2/17/2005		Arkansas–Little Rock	L 53–55	18–6 (8-4)	E. A. Diddle Arena (5,053); Bowling Green, KY
2/19/2005*		Bradley	W 75–60	19–6	E. A. Diddle Arena (6,102); Bowling Green, KY
02/24/2005		Middle Tennessee	W 85–83 ^{OT}	20–6 (9-4)	E. A. Diddle Arena (6,455); Bowling Green, KY
2/26/2005		at FIU	L 77–79	20–7 (9-5)	Ocean Bank Convocation Center (1,019); University Park, FL
2005 Sun Belt Conference men's basketball tournament
03/06/2005	(2E)	vs. (3W) New Orleans; Second Round	W 78–67	21–7	UNT Coliseum (1,724); Denton, TX
03/07/2005	(2E)	vs. (1W) Denver; Semifinals	L 68–77	21–8	UNT Coliseum (805); Denton, TX
2005 National Invitation Tournament
03/16/2005*		Kent State; Opening Round	W 88–80 ^{OT}	22–8	E. A. Diddle Arena (4,325); Bowling Green, KY
03/19/2005*		at Wichita State; First Round	L 81–84	22–9	Charles Koch Arena (10,478); Wichita, KS
*Non-conference game. ^{#}Rankings from AP Poll; Louisiana-Lafayette’s wins were vacated by the NCAA due to the participation of an ineligible player.. (#) Tournament seedings in parentheses.
