= 2004–05 Louisiana–Lafayette Ragin' Cajuns men's basketball team =

American college basketball season

2004–05 Louisiana–Lafayette Ragin' Cajuns men's basketball

Sun Belt tournament champions

NCAA tournament
- Conference: Sun Belt Conference
- West
- Record: 20–11 (11–4 Sun Belt)
- Head coach: Robert Lee (1st season)
- Assistant coach: Carlin Hartman (1st season)
- Home arena: Cajundome

2004–05 Sun Belt Conference men's basketball standings
	Conf.				Overall
Team	W		L	PCT	W		L	PCT
East
Little Rock	10	–	4	.714	18	–	10	.643
Western Kentucky	9	–	5	.643	22	–	9	.710
Middle Tennessee	7	–	7	.500	19	–	12	.613
Arkansas State	7	–	7	.500	16	–	13	.552
Florida International	4	–	10	.286	13	–	17	.433
West
Denver	12	–	3	.800	20	–	11	.645
Louisiana–Lafayette †	11	–	4	.733	20	–	11	.645
New Orleans	7	–	8	.467	13	–	17	.433
South Alabama	6	–	9	.400	10	–	18	.357
North Texas	6	–	9	.400	14	–	14	.500
New Mexico State	1	–	14	.067	6	–	24	.200
† 2005 Sun Belt Conference tournament winner Rankings from AP poll

The 2004–05 Louisiana–Lafayette Ragin' Cajuns men's basketball team represented the University of Louisiana at Lafayette during the 2004–05 NCAA Division I men's basketball season. The Ragin' Cajuns, led by first-year head coach Robert Lee, played their home games at the Cajundome and were members of the Sun Belt Conference. They finished the season 20–11, 11–4 in Sun Belt play to finish in second place in the West division. They were champions of the Sun Belt Conference tournament to earn an automatic bid to the NCAA tournament where they lost in the first round to No. 4 seed and eventual Final Four NC State.

== Roster ==
2004–05 Louisiana Ragin' Cajuns men's basketball team
Players	Coaches
Pos. / # / Name / Height / Weight / Year / Hometown; G / 5 / Orien Greene / 6 ft 4 in (1.93 m) / 205 lb (93 kg) / Sr	Head coach: Robert Lee; Assistant coach(es): Carlin Hartman; Legend: (C) Team captain; (S) Suspended; (I) Ineligible; (W) Walk-on; Injured; Current redshirt; Roster

== Schedule and results ==
Date time, TV	Rank^{#}	Opponent^{#}	Result	Record	Site (attendance) city, state
Regular season
Sun Belt tournament
NCAA tournament
Mar 18, 2005*	(13 ABQ)	vs. (4 ABQ) No. 4 Louisville; First round	L 62–68	20–11	Bridgestone Arena; Nashville, Tennessee
*Non-conference game. ^{#}Rankings from AP Poll. (#) Tournament seedings in parentheses. ABQ=Albuquerque. All times are in Central Time.
