= 2004–05 Xavier Musketeers men's basketball team =

American college basketball season

2004–05 Xavier Musketeers men's basketball

Orange Bowl Basketball Classic Champion
- Conference: Atlantic 10 Conference
- Record: 17-12 (10-6 A-10)
- Head coach: Sean Miller
- Home arena: Cintas Center

2004–05 Atlantic 10 men's basketball standings
	Conf.				Overall
Team	W		L	PCT	W		L	PCT
East
Saint Joseph's	14	–	2	.875	24	–	12	.667
Temple	11	–	5	.688	16	–	14	.533
UMass	9	–	7	.563	16	–	12	.571
Fordham	8	–	8	.500	13	–	16	.448
Rhode Island	4	–	12	.250	6	–	22	.214
St. Bonaventure	1	–	15	.063	2	–	26	.071
West
George Washington †	11	–	5	.688	22	–	8	.733
Dayton	10	–	6	.625	18	–	11	.621
Xavier	10	–	6	.625	17	–	12	.586
Richmond	8	–	8	.500	14	–	15	.483
La Salle	5	–	11	.313	10	–	19	.345
Duquesne	5	–	11	.313	8	–	22	.267
† 2005 Atlantic 10 Tournament winner Rankings from AP Poll

The 2004–05 Xavier Musketeers men's basketball team represented Xavier University in the 2004–05 college basketball season. They were led by head coach Sean Miller. The Musketeers were members of the Atlantic 10 Conference and played their home games at the Cintas Center.

On November 27, 2004, Xavier defeated Miami (FL) 83–70 in the Orange Bowl Basketball Classic.

The Musketeers finished with a 17–12 record. They were eliminated from the A-10 tournament in the second round in a 73–68 loss to Saint Joseph's on March 11, 2005.
