= 2004–05 Virginia Tech Hokies men's basketball team =

American college basketball season

Virginia Tech Hokies men's basketball
- Conference: Atlantic Coast Conference
- Record: 16-14 (8-8 ACC)
- Head coach: Seth Greenberg (2nd season)
- Associate head coach: Brad Greenberg
- Assistant coaches: Ryan Odom; Stacey Palmore
- Home arena: Cassell Coliseum

2004–05 ACC men's basketball standings
	Conf.				Overall
Team	W		L	PCT	W		L	PCT
No. 2 North Carolina	14	–	2	.875	33	–	4	.892
No. 5 Wake Forest	13	–	3	.813	27	–	6	.818
No. 3 Duke†	11	–	5	.688	27	–	6	.818
Virginia Tech	8	–	8	.500	16	–	14	.533
No. 25 Georgia Tech	8	–	8	.500	20	–	12	.625
Miami (FL)	7	–	9	.438	16	–	13	.552
NC State	7	–	9	.438	21	–	14	.600
Maryland	7	–	9	.438	19	–	13	.594
Clemson	5	–	11	.313	16	–	16	.500
Florida State	4	–	12	.250	14	–	15	.483
Virginia	4	–	12	.250	14	–	15	.483
† 2005 ACC tournament winner Rankings from AP Poll

The 2004–05 Virginia Tech Hokies men's basketball team represented Virginia Tech during the 2004-05 NCAA Division 1 men's basketball season. Led by 2nd-year head coach Seth Greenberg, the Hokies played their home games at Cassell Coliseum in Blacksburg, Virginia, during their first season in the Atlantic Coast Conference. The Hokies finished 15–12 on the season and 8–8 in conference. In the ACC Conference Tournament the Hokies were knocked out by 5th seed Georgia Tech in the quarter finals. In the NIT the Hokies beat Temple in the first round, but fell short to Memphis in the second.

== Previous season ==
In the 2003–04 NCAA Division I men's basketball season the Virginia Tech Hokies men's basketball team represented Virginia Tech during its final season in the Big East Conference. The team was led by first-year head coach Seth Greenberg. The Hokies finished the season 15–14 overall, and 7–9 in conference play. In the 2004 Big East Conference Tournament the Hokies beat Rutgers in the first round, but lost to Pittsburgh in the quarter finals.

== Roster ==
2004–05 Virginia Tech Hokies men's basketball team
Players
Coaches
|

Pos.	#	Name	Height	Weight	Year	Previous school	Hometown
G	1	Zabian Dowdell	6 ft 2 in (1.88 m)	195 lb (88 kg)	So	Pahokee High School	Pahokee, FL
G	2	Bob Ritchie (W)	6 ft 5 in (1.96 m)	190 lb (86 kg)	Jr	Lake Braddock Secondary School	Burke, VA
G	3	Shawn Harris	6 ft 4 in (1.93 m)	220 lb (100 kg)	Jr	Fork Union Military Academy	Ettrick, VA
G/F	11	Wynton Witherspoon	6 ft 7 in (2.01 m)	180 lb (82 kg)	Fr	Berkmar	Atlanta, GA
C	13	Deron Washington	6 ft 7 in (2.01 m)	190 lb (86 kg)	Fr	National Christian Academy Md	New Orleans, LA
F/C	14	Robert Krabbendam	6 ft 11 in (2.11 m)	210 lb (95 kg)	Fr	Copernicus	Hoorn
G	15	Marquie Cooke	6 ft 3 in (1.91 m)	200 lb (91 kg)	Fr	Nansemond River	Suffolk, VA
F	21	Allen Calloway	6 ft 8 in (2.03 m)	215 lb (98 kg)	Jr	Tunstall,Coastal Christian Academy	Gretna, VA
G	22	Jamon Gordon	6 ft 3 in (1.91 m)	190 lb (86 kg)	So	Andrew Jackson High School	Jacksonville, Fl
G	23	Marcus Travis (W)	6 ft 3 in (1.91 m)	210 lb (95 kg)	So	Blacksburg/Oxnard Junior College	Blacksburg, VA
G	24	Markus Sailes	6 ft 5 in (1.96 m)	205 lb (93 kg)	RS Jr	Varina High School	Richmond, VA
F	25	Jeff King	6 ft 5 in (1.96 m)	263 lb (119 kg)	Jr	Pulaski County High School	Pulaski, VA
G/F	32	Carlos Dixon	6 ft 7 in (2.01 m)	200 lb (91 kg)	RS Sr	South Rowan High School, Fork Union Military Academy	Salisbury, NC
F	33	Coleman Collins	6 ft 8 in (2.03 m)	228 lb (103 kg)	So	Chamblee High School	Stone Mountain, GA
F	42	Chris Tucker (W)	6 ft 7 in (2.01 m)	220 lb (100 kg)	So	Lord Botetourt High School,Fork Union Military Academy	Fincastle, VA

Head coach

- Seth Greenberg (Fairleigh Dickinson)

Assistant coach(es)

- Brad Greenberg (American)
- Ryan Odom (Hampden–Sydney)
- Stacey Palmore (Livingstone)

Legend

- (C) Team captain
- (S) Suspended
- (I) Ineligible
- (W) Walk-on
- Injured
- Current redshirt

Roster

== 2005–2006 schedule and results ==
Date time, TV	Rank^{#}	Opponent^{#}	Result	Record	Site city, state
Regular season
Nov 19, 2004*		Loyola MD	W 81-58	1–0	Cassell Coliseum; Blacksburg, VA
Nov 23, 2004*		Maryland Eastern Shore	W 102-50	2–0	Cassell Coliseum; Blacksburg, VA
Nov 28, 2004*		William & Mary	W 80-63	3–0	Kaplan Arena; Williamsburg, VA
Dec 2, 2004*		Chattanooga	W 63-59	4–0	Cassell Coliseum; Blacksburg, VA
Dec 4, 2004*		VMI	L 68-72	4–1	Cameron Hall (arena); Lexington, VA
Dec 8, 2004*		St. John's	L 65-75	4–2	Carnesecca Arena; Jamaica, NY
Dec 11, 2004*		JMU	W 77-53	5–2	Cassell Coliseum; Blacksburg, VA
Dec 29, 2004	No. 5	UNC	L 51-85	5-3 (0-1)	Cassell Coliseum; Blacksburg, VA
Dec 22, 2004*		Western Michigan	L 68-74	5-4 (0-1)	Cassell Coliseum; Blacksburg, VA
Dec 27, 2004*		Morgan State	W 67-54	6-4 (0-1)	Cassell Coliseum; Blacksburg, VA
Dec 30, 2004*	No. 21	Mississippi State	L 65-71	6-5 (0-1)	New Orleans Arena; New Orleans, LA
Jan 8, 2005		FSU	L 70-77	6-6 (0-2)	Donald L. Tucker Civic Center; Tallahassee, FL
Jan 12, 2005*		Bethune-Cookman	W 69-58	7-6 (0-2)	Cassell Coliseum; Blacksburg, VA
Jan 15, 2005		Clemson	W 59-57	8-6 (1-2)	Cassell Coliseum; Blacksburg, VA
Jan 19, 2005		NC State	W 72-71	9-6 (2-2)	Cassell Coliseum; Blacksburg, VA
Jan 22, 2005	No. 12	Georgia Tech	W 70-69	10-6 (3-2)	Alexander Memorial Coliseum; Atlanta, GA
Jan 27, 2005		UVA	W 79-73	11-6 (4-2)	Cassell Coliseum; Blacksburg, VA
Jan 30, 2005	No. 2	Duke	L 65-100	11-7 (4-3)	Cameron Indoor Stadium; Durham, NC
Feb 2, 2005		U Miami(FL)	W 73-63	12-7 (5-3)	Watsco Center; Coral Gables, Fl
Feb 5, 2005	No. 7	Wake Forrest	L 63-83	12-8 (5-4)	Cassell Coliseum; Blacksburg, VA
Feb 8, 2005		Maryland	L 71-86	12-9 (5-5)	Comcast Center; College Park, Maryland
Feb 12, 2005		UVA	L 60-65	12-10 (5-6)	University Hall; Charlottesville, VA
Feb 17, 2005	No. 7	Duke	W 67-65	13-10 (6-6)	Cassell Coliseum; Blacksburg, VA
Feb 19, 2005		U Miami(FL)	W 71-58	14-10 (7-6)	Cassell Coliseum; Blacksburg, VA
Feb 26, 2005		NC State	L 54-74	14-11 (7-7)	RBC Arena; Raleigh, NC
Mar 1, 2005		Clemson	L 64-66	14-12 (7-8)	Littlejohn Coliseum; Clemson, SC
Mar 5, 2005		Maryland	W 86-76	15-12 (8-8)	RBC Arena; Raleigh, NC
ACC Tournament
Mar 11, 2005		Georgia Tech	L 54-73	15-13 (8-8)	Verizon Center; Washington D.C.
NIT
Mar 15, 2005		Temple	W 60-50	16-13 (8-8)	Cassell Coliseum; Blacksburg, VA
Mar 19, 2005		Memphis	L 62-83	16-14 (8-8)	FedExForum; Memphis, TN
*Non-conference game. ^{#}Rankings from AP Poll. (#) Tournament seedings in parentheses. All times are in Eastern Time.

== See also ==
VT MBB Media Guide 1999-2022
