= 2004–05 NC State Wolfpack men's basketball team =

American college basketball season

2004–05 NC State Wolfpack men's basketball

NCAA tournament, Sweet Sixteen
- Conference: Atlantic Coast Conference

Ranking
- Coaches: No. 22
- Record: 21–14 (7–9 ACC)
- Head coach: Herb Sendek (9th season)
- Home arena: RBC Center

2004–05 ACC men's basketball standings
	Conf.				Overall
Team	W		L	PCT	W		L	PCT
No. 2 North Carolina	14	–	2	.875	33	–	4	.892
No. 5 Wake Forest	13	–	3	.813	27	–	6	.818
No. 3 Duke†	11	–	5	.688	27	–	6	.818
Virginia Tech	8	–	8	.500	16	–	14	.533
No. 25 Georgia Tech	8	–	8	.500	20	–	12	.625
Miami (FL)	7	–	9	.438	16	–	13	.552
NC State	7	–	9	.438	21	–	14	.600
Maryland	7	–	9	.438	19	–	13	.594
Clemson	5	–	11	.313	16	–	16	.500
Florida State	4	–	12	.250	14	–	15	.483
Virginia	4	–	12	.250	14	–	15	.483
† 2005 ACC tournament winner Rankings from AP Poll

The 2004–05 NC State Wolfpack men's basketball team represented North Carolina State University as a member of the Atlantic Coast Conference during the 2004–05 men's college basketball season. It was Herb Sendek's ninth season as head coach. The Wolfpack earned a bid to the NCAA tournament, reached the Sweet Sixteen, and finished with a record of 21–14 (7–9 ACC).

== Roster ==
2004–05 NC State Wolfpack men's basketball team
Players
Coaches

Pos.	#	Name	Height	Weight	Year	Previous school	Hometown
F/C	3	Ilian Evtimov	6 ft 7 in (2.01 m)	232 lb (105 kg)	RS Jr	Bishop McGuinness Catholic HS	Sofia, Bulgaria
G	10	Braxton Albritton	6 ft 1 in (1.85 m)	206 lb (93 kg)	Fr	Broughton HS	Raleigh, North Carolina
G/F	11	Gavin Grant	6 ft 7 in (2.01 m)	190 lb (86 kg)	Fr	St. Raymond HS	Bronx, New York
G/F	13	Cameron Bennerman	6 ft 4 in (1.93 m)	198 lb (90 kg)	Jr	Grimsley HS	Greensboro, North Carolina
G	14	Engin Atsür	6 ft 3 in (1.91 m)	200 lb (91 kg)	So	St. Benoit HS	Istanbul, Turkey
F	21	Levi Watkins	6 ft 8 in (2.03 m)	235 lb (107 kg)	Sr	Montrose Christian School	Rockville, Maryland
G	22	Tony Bethel	6 ft 2 in (1.88 m)	178 lb (81 kg)	RS Jr	Montrose Christian School; Georgetown	Fort Washington, Maryland
G	24	Julius Hodge	6 ft 7 in (2.01 m)	205 lb (93 kg)	Sr	St. Raymond HS	Harlem, New York
C	32	Jordan Collins	6 ft 10 in (2.08 m)	242 lb (110 kg)	Sr	DeMatha Catholic HS	Hyattsville, Maryland
F/C	33	Cedric Simmons	6 ft 9 in (2.06 m)	216 lb (98 kg)	Fr	West Brunswick HS	Shallotte, North Carolina
C	34	Adam Simons	6 ft 10 in (2.08 m)	242 lb (110 kg)	RS So	Walter M. Williams HS	Burlington, North Carolina
F	40	Andrew Brackman	6 ft 10 in (2.08 m)	205 lb (93 kg)	Fr	Moeller HS	Cincinnati, Ohio

Head coach

- Herb Sendek (Carnegie Mellon)

Assistant coach(es)

Legend

- (C) Team captain
- (S) Suspended
- (I) Ineligible
- (W) Walk-on
- Injured
- Current redshirt

Roster

== Schedule ==
Date time, TV	Rank^{#}	Opponent^{#}	Result	Record	Site city, state
Regular season
Nov 17, 2004*	No. 19	New Orleans	W 92–58	1–0	RBC Center; Raleigh, North Carolina
Nov 18, 2004*	No. 19	Elon	W 71–45	2–0	RBC Center; Raleigh, North Carolina
Nov 19, 2004*	No. 19	East Carolina	W 100–66	3–0	RBC Center; Raleigh, North Carolina
Nov 26, 2004*	No. 17	Campbell	W 99–44	4–0	RBC Center; Raleigh, North Carolina
Nov 29, 2004*	No. 16	Purdue; ACC-Big Ten Challenge	W 60–53	5–0	RBC Center; Raleigh, North Carolina
Dec 5, 2004*	No. 16	Manhattan	W 76–60	6–0	RBC Center; Raleigh, North Carolina
Dec 11, 2004*	No. 12	Liberty	W 94–60	7–0	RBC Center; Raleigh, North Carolina
Dec 15, 2004*	No. 12	Louisiana–Lafayette	W 78–72	8–0	RBC Center; Raleigh, North Carolina
Dec 19, 2004*	No. 12	at No. 18 Washington	L 64–68	8–1	Bank of America Arena; Seattle, Washington
Dec 21, 2004*	No. 16	at BYU	W 72–61	9–1	Marriott Center; Provo, Utah
Dec 28, 2004*	No. 17	vs. Columbia; Dreyfus Holiday Festival	W 84–74	10–1	Madison Square Garden; New York, New York
Dec 30, 2004*	No. 17	at St. John's; Dreyfus Holiday Festival	L 45–63	10–2	Madison Square Garden; New York, New York
Jan 2, 2005*	No. 17	West Virginia	L 69–82	10–3	RBC Center; Raleigh, North Carolina
Jan 9, 2005		at Miami (FL)	L 66–67	10–4 (0–1)	BankUnited Center; Miami, Florida
Jan 13, 2005		No. 5 Duke	L 74–86	10–5 (0–2)	RBC Center; Raleigh, North Carolina
Jan 16, 2005		No. 8 Georgia Tech	W 76–68	11–5 (1–2)	RBC Center; Raleigh, North Carolina
Jan 19, 2005		at Virginia Tech	L 71–72	11–6 (1–3)	Cassell Coliseum; Blacksburg, Virginia
Jan 23, 2005		at Maryland	W 85–69	12–6 (2–3)	Comcast Center; College Park, Maryland
Jan 26, 2005		Florida State	L 64–70	12–7 (2–4)	RBC Center; Raleigh, North Carolina
Jan 29, 2005		at Clemson	W 80–70	13–7 (3–4)	Littlejohn Coliseum; Clemson, South Carolina
Feb 3, 2005		at No. 2 North Carolina	L 71–95	13–8 (3–5)	Dean Smith Center; Chapel Hill, North Carolina
Feb 5, 2005		Virginia	L 62–64	13–9 (3–6)	RBC Center; Raleigh, North Carolina
Feb 10, 2005		at No. 6 Wake Forest	L 75–86	13–10 (3–7)	Lawrence Joel Coliseum; Winston-Salem, North Carolina
ACC Tournament
Mar 10, 2005		vs. Florida State; First round	W 70–54	18–12	MCI Center; Washington, D.C.
Mar 11, 2005		vs. No. 3 Wake Forest; Quarterfinals	W 81–65	19–12	MCI Center; Washington, D.C.
Mar 12, 2005		vs. No. 5 Duke; Semifinals	L 69–76	19–13	MCI Center; Washington, D.C.
NCAA Tournament
Mar 18, 2005*	(10 SYR)	vs. (7 SYR) Charlotte; First round	W 75–63	20–13	DCU Center; Worcester, Massachusetts
Mar 20, 2005	(10 SYR)	vs. (2 SYR) No. 13 Connecticut; Second Round	W 65–62	21–13	DCU Center; Worcester, Massachusetts
Mar 25, 2005*	(10 SYR)	vs. (6 SYR) No. 20 Wisconsin; Regional semifinal – Sweet Sixteen	L 56–65	21–14	Carrier Dome; Syracuse, New York
*Non-conference game. ^{#}Rankings from AP Poll. (#) Tournament seedings in parentheses. SYR=Syracuse. All times are in Eastern Time.

== NBA draft ==
Round	Pick	Player	NBA club
1	20	Julius Hodge	Denver Nuggets
