= 2004–05 Georgia Tech Yellow Jackets men's basketball team =

American college basketball season

2004–05 Georgia Tech Yellow Jackets men's basketball

NCAA tournament, second round
- Conference: Atlantic Coast Conference

Ranking
- AP: No. 25
- Record: 20–12 (8–8 ACC)
- Head coach: Paul Hewitt (5th season)
- Home arena: Alexander Memorial Coliseum

2004–05 ACC men's basketball standings
	Conf.				Overall
Team	W		L	PCT	W		L	PCT
No. 2 North Carolina	14	–	2	.875	33	–	4	.892
No. 5 Wake Forest	13	–	3	.813	27	–	6	.818
No. 3 Duke†	11	–	5	.688	27	–	6	.818
Virginia Tech	8	–	8	.500	16	–	14	.533
No. 25 Georgia Tech	8	–	8	.500	20	–	12	.625
Miami (FL)	7	–	9	.438	16	–	13	.552
NC State	7	–	9	.438	21	–	14	.600
Maryland	7	–	9	.438	19	–	13	.594
Clemson	5	–	11	.313	16	–	16	.500
Florida State	4	–	12	.250	14	–	15	.483
Virginia	4	–	12	.250	14	–	15	.483
† 2005 ACC tournament winner Rankings from AP Poll

The 2004–05 Georgia Tech Yellow Jackets men's basketball team represented Georgia Institute of Technology as a member of the Atlantic Coast Conference during the 2004–05 season. Led by fifth-year head coach Paul Hewitt, the Yellow Jackets had high expectations entering the season with numerous returning players from the previous season's NCAA Tournament runner-up team. They were ranked in the top 5 of preseason AP and Coaches' Polls, receiving first-place votes in both. The team struggled to a .500 record in ACC play, but looked strong in the ACC Tournament, and received an at-large bid to the NCAA tournament. Playing as No. 5 seed in the Midwest region, Georgia Tech beat George Washington before falling to No. 4 seed and eventual Final Four participant Louisville in the round of 32 to finish 20–12 overall (8–8 ACC).

== Roster ==
2004–05 Georgia Tech Yellow Jackets men's basketball team
Players
Coaches

Pos.	#	Name	Height	Weight	Year	Hometown
G	1	B. J. Elder	6 ft 4 in (1.93 m)	218 lb (99 kg)	Sr	Madison, GA
F	2	Isma'il Muhammad	6 ft 6 in (1.98 m)	228 lb (103 kg)	Sr	Atlanta, GA
G	3	Jarrett Jack	6 ft 3 in (1.91 m)	200 lb (91 kg)	Jr	Fort Washington, MD
F/C	4	Ra'Sean Dickey	6 ft 10 in (2.08 m)	250 lb (113 kg)	Fr	Clio, SC
G	5	Mario West	6 ft 5 in (1.96 m)	210 lb (95 kg)	Jr	Douglasville, GA
F	10	Jim Nyström	6 ft 4 in (1.93 m)	210 lb (95 kg)	Jr	Stockholm, Sweden
G	11	Will Bynum	6 ft 0 in (1.83 m)	185 lb (84 kg)	Sr	Chicago, IL
C	12	Luke Schenscher	7 ft 1 in (2.16 m)	255 lb (116 kg)	Sr	Canberra, Australia
G	14	Keith Jones	6 ft 2 in (1.88 m)	195 lb (88 kg)	So	Austell, GA
G	23	Anthony Morrow	6 ft 5 in (1.96 m)	210 lb (95 kg)	Fr	Charlotte, NC
F	32	Jeremis Smith	6 ft 8 in (2.03 m)	230 lb (104 kg)	Fr	Fort Worth, TX
F	44	Theodis Tarver	6 ft 9 in (2.06 m)	245 lb (111 kg)	Jr	Monroe, LA
G	55	Anthony McHenry	6 ft 7 in (2.01 m)	220 lb (100 kg)	Sr	Birmingham, AL

Head coach

- Paul Hewitt (St. John Fisher)

Assistant coach(es)

Legend

- (C) Team captain
- (S) Suspended
- (I) Ineligible
- (W) Walk-on
- Injured
- Current redshirt

== Schedule and results ==
Date time, TV	Rank^{#}	Opponent^{#}	Result	Record	Site city, state
Regular Season
Nov 19, 2004*	No. 3	Alabama State	W 74–37	1–0	Alexander Memorial Coliseum; Atlanta, Georgia
ACC Tournament
Mar 11, 2005*		vs. Virginia Tech; Quarterfinals	W 73–54	18–10	MCI Center; Washington, D.C.
Mar 12, 2005*		vs. No. 2 North Carolina; Semifinals	W 78–75	19–10	MCI Center; Washington, D.C.
Mar 13, 2005*		vs. No. 5 Duke; Championship game	L 64–69	19–11	MCI Center; Washington, D.C.
NCAA Tournament
Mar 18, 2005*	(5 MW) No. 25	vs. (12 MW) George Washington; First Round	W 80–68	20–11	Bridgestone Arena; Nashville, Tennessee
Mar 20, 2005*	(5 MW) No. 25	vs. (4 MW) No. 4 Louisville; Second Round	L 54–76	20–12	Bridgestone Arena; Nashville, Tennessee
*Non-conference game. ^{#}Rankings from AP Poll. (#) Tournament seedings in parentheses.

== Players in the 2005 NBA draft ==
Round	Pick	Player	NBA club
1	22	Jarrett Jack	Denver Nuggets
