= 2005 Atlantic 10 men's basketball tournament =

- Classification: Division I
- Season: 2004–05
- Teams: 12
- Site: U.S. Bank Arena; Cincinnati, Ohio
- Champions: George Washington Colonials (1st title)
- Winning coach: Karl Hobbs (1st title)
- MVP: Pat Carroll (Saint Joseph's)

2004–05 Atlantic 10 men's basketball standings
	Conf.				Overall
Team	W		L	PCT	W		L	PCT
East
Saint Joseph's	14	–	2	.875	24	–	12	.667
Temple	11	–	5	.688	16	–	14	.533
UMass	9	–	7	.563	16	–	12	.571
Fordham	8	–	8	.500	13	–	16	.448
Rhode Island	4	–	12	.250	6	–	22	.214
St. Bonaventure	1	–	15	.063	2	–	26	.071
West
George Washington †	11	–	5	.688	22	–	8	.733
Dayton	10	–	6	.625	18	–	11	.621
Xavier	10	–	6	.625	17	–	12	.586
Richmond	8	–	8	.500	14	–	15	.483
La Salle	5	–	11	.313	10	–	19	.345
Duquesne	5	–	11	.313	8	–	22	.267
† 2005 Atlantic 10 Tournament winner Rankings from AP Poll

The 2005 Atlantic 10 men's basketball tournament was played from March 9 to March 12, 2005, at U.S. Bank Arena in Cincinnati, Ohio. The winner was named champion of the Atlantic 10 Conference and received an automatic bid to the 2005 NCAA Men's Division I Basketball Tournament. George Washington won the tournament. The top two teams in each division received first-round byes. George Washington earned the conference's only bid to the NCAA tournament.

== Bracket ==
First round Wednesday, March 9
W4	Richmond	68
E5	Rhode Island	60
E3	UMass	64^{OT}
W6	La Salle	70
E4	Fordham	65
W5	Duquesne	53
W3	Dayton	78
E6	St. Bonaventure	48

Quarterfinals; Thursday, March 10
E1	Saint Joseph's	63
W4	Richmond	51
W2	Xavier	83
W6	La Salle	70
W1	George Washington	79
E4	Fordham	63
E2	Temple	61
W3	Dayton	51

Semifinals; Friday, March 11
E1	Saint Joseph's	73
W2	Xavier	68
W1	George Washington	77
E2	Temple	58

Final; Saturday, March 12
E1	Saint Joseph's	67
W1	George Washington	76

All games played at U.S. Bank Arena in Cincinnati.
