= 2004–05 UAB Blazers men's basketball team =

American college basketball season

2004–05 UAB Blazers men's basketball

NCAA tournament, Second round
- Conference: Conference USA
- Record: 22–11 (10–6 C-USA)
- Head coach: Mike Anderson (3rd season)
- Home arena: Bartow Arena

2004–05 Conference USA men's basketball standings
	Conf.				Overall
Team	W		L	PCT	W		L	PCT
No. 4 Louisville †	14	–	2	.875	33	–	5	.868
Charlotte	12	–	4	.750	21	–	8	.724
No. 23 Cincinnati	12	–	4	.750	25	–	8	.758
UAB	10	–	6	.625	22	–	11	.667
DePaul	10	–	6	.625	20	–	11	.645
Houston	9	–	7	.563	18	–	14	.563
Memphis	9	–	7	.563	22	–	16	.579
TCU	8	–	8	.500	21	–	14	.600
Marquette	7	–	9	.438	19	–	12	.613
Saint Louis	6	–	10	.375	9	–	21	.300
South Florida	5	–	11	.313	14	–	16	.467
Tulane	4	–	12	.250	10	–	18	.357
East Carolina	4	–	12	.250	9	–	19	.321
Southern Miss	2	–	14	.125	11	–	17	.393
† 2005 Conference USA Tournament winner Rankings from AP Poll

The 2004–05 UAB Blazers men's basketball team represented the University of Alabama at Birmingham as a member of the Conference USA during the 2004–05 NCAA Division I men's basketball season. This was head coach Mike Anderson's third season at UAB, and the Blazers played their home games at Bartow Arena. They finished the season 22–11, 10–6 in C-USA play and lost in the semifinals of the C-USA tournament. They received an at-large bid to the NCAA tournament as No. 11 seed in the Chicago region. The Blazers defeated No. 6 seed LSU in the opening round. In the round of 32, UAB fell to No. 3 seed Arizona, 85–63.

== Roster ==
2004–05 UAB Blazers men's basketball team
Players
Coaches

Pos.	#	Name	Height	Weight	Year	Hometown
G	0	Carldell Johnson	5 ft 10 in (1.78 m)	175 lb (79 kg)	Jr	New Orleans, Louisiana
G/F	1	Donell Taylor	6 ft 6 in (1.98 m)	180 lb (82 kg)	Sr	Montgomery, Alabama
G/F	2	Ronell Taylor	6 ft 5 in (1.96 m)	180 lb (82 kg)	Sr	Montgomery, Alabama
G	4	Paul Delaney III	6 ft 2 in (1.88 m)	185 lb (84 kg)	Fr	Decatur, Georgia
F	23	Demario Eddins	6 ft 7 in (2.01 m)	190 lb (86 kg)	Jr	Chicago, Illinois

Head coach

- Mike Anderson

Assistant coach(es)

Legend

- (C) Team captain
- (S) Suspended
- (I) Ineligible
- (W) Walk-on
- Injured
- Current redshirt

Roster

== Schedule and results ==
Date time, TV	Rank^{#}	Opponent^{#}	Result	Record	Site (attendance) city, state
Regular season
Nov 27, 2004*		VCU	W 79–55	1–0	Bartow Arena (4,585); Birmingham, Alabama
Nov 29, 2004*		Louisiana Tech	W 66–54	2–0	Bartow Arena (4,053); Birmingham, Alabama
Dec 2, 2004*		Nebraska	W 80–66	3–0	Bartow Arena (6,543); Birmingham, Alabama
Dec 4, 2004*		at Marshall	W 81–78	4–0	Cam Henderson Center (5,079); Huntington, West Virginia
Dec 10, 2004*		at No. 5 Oklahoma State	L 73–86	4–1	Gallagher-Iba Arena (12,889); Stillwater, Oklahoma
Dec 15, 2004*		Belmont	W 107–76	5–1	Bartow Arena (4,243); Birmingham, Alabama
Dec 17, 2004*		at Richmond	L 81–96	5–2	Robins Center (4,730); Richmond, Virginia
Dec 21, 2004*		vs. Clemson; Rainbow Classic	W 78–66	6–2	Stan Sheriff Center (6,274); Honolulu, Hawaii
Dec 22, 2004*		vs. USC; Rainbow Classic	L 78–81	6–3	Stan Sheriff Center (7,535); Honolulu, Hawaii
Dec 23, 2004*		vs. Oral Roberts; Rainbow Classic	W 84–77	7–3	Stan Sheriff Center (8,044); Honolulu, Hawaii
Dec 28, 2004*		Alabama A&M	W 100–68	8–3	Bartow Arena (5,785); Birmingham, Alabama
Dec 31, 2004*		at South Alabama	W 82–76	9–3	Mitchell Center (2,467); Mobile, Alabama
Jan 2, 2005*		Murray State	W 100–80	10–3	Bartow Arena (3,718); Birmingham, Alabama
Jan 5, 2005		Southern Miss	W 83–75	11–3 (1–0)	Bartow Arena (5,605); Birmingham, Alabama
Jan 8, 2005		at South Florida	W 62–61	12–3 (2–0)	Sun Dome (3,108); Tampa, Florida
Jan 12, 2005		Charlotte	L 85–91	12–4 (2–1)	Bartow Arena (7,277); Birmingham, Alabama
Jan 15, 2005		at East Carolina	W 76–64	13–4 (3–1)	Williams Arena at Minges Coliseum (4,634); Greenville, North Carolina
Jan 19, 2005		at Tulane	L 73–76 ^{OT}	13–5 (3–2)	Avron B. Fogelman Arena (1,717); New Orleans, Louisiana
Jan 22, 2005		Memphis	W 73–70	14–5 (4–2)	Bartow Arena (7,979); Birmingham, Alabama
Jan 29, 2005		South Florida	W 85–71	15–5 (5–2)	Bartow Arena (8,183); Birmingham, Alabama
Feb 2, 2005		at Marquette	W 86–63	16–5 (6–2)	Bradley Center (1,2789); Milwaukee, Wisconsin
Feb 5, 2005		No. 9 Louisville	L 73–77	16–6 (6–3)	Bartow Arena (9,354); Birmingham, Alabama
Feb 12, 2005		at TCU	L 65–76	16–7 (6–4)	Daniel-Meyer Coliseum (5,459); Fort Worth, Texas
Feb 16, 2005		East Carolina	L 64–67	16–8 (6–5)	Bartow Arena (4,378); Birmingham, Alabama
Feb 19, 2005		at No. 24 Cincinnati	L 69–72	16–9 (6–6)	Fifth Third Arena (13,176); Cincinnati, Ohio
Feb 23, 2005		at Saint Louis	W 64–62	17–9 (7–6)	Scottrade Center (7,394); St. Louis, Missouri
Feb 26, 2005		Tulane	W 87–58	18–9 (8–6)	Bartow Arena (7,376); Birmingham, Alabama
Mar 2, 2005		DePaul	W 81–80 ^{OT}	19–9 (9–6)	Bartow Arena (5,439); Birmingham, Alabama
Mar 5, 2005		at Houston	W 71–66	20–9 (10–6)	Hofheinz Pavilion (6,420); Houston, Texas
C-USA tournament
Mar 10, 2005*		vs. DePaul; Quarterfinals	W 59–56	21–9	FedExForum (8,592); Memphis, Tennessee
Mar 11, 2005*		vs. No. 6 Louisville; Semifinals	L 67–74	21–10	FedExForum (10,080); Memphis, Tennessee
NCAA tournament
Mar 17, 2005*	(11 CHI)	vs. (6 CHI) LSU; First round	W 82–68	22–10	Taco Bell Arena (11,894); Boise, Idaho
Mar 19, 2005*	(11 CHI)	vs. (3 CHI) No. 9 Arizona; Second round	L 63–85	22–11	Taco Bell Arena (11,891); Boise, Idaho
*Non-conference game. ^{#}Rankings from AP poll. (#) Tournament seedings in parentheses. CHI=Chicago.
