= 2005 Sun Belt Conference men's basketball tournament =

- Classification: Division I
- Season: 2004–05
- Teams: 11
- Site: UNT Coliseum; Denton, TX
- Champions: Louisiana–Lafayette (5th title)
- Winning coach: Robert Lee (1st title)
- MVP: Tiras Wade (Louisiana-Lafayette)

The 2005 Sun Belt Conference men's basketball tournament was held March 4–8 at UNT Coliseum in Denton, TX.

Second-seed from the West division Louisiana–Lafayette defeated #1 seed from the West division Denver in the championship game, 88–69, to win their fifth Sun Belt men's basketball tournament.

The Ragin' Cajuns received an automatic bid to the 2005 NCAA tournament as the #13 seed in the Albuquerque region. No other Sun Belt members earned bids to the tournament.

== Format ==
All eleven participating Sun Belt members were seeded based on regular season conference records.

== Bracket ==
First Round; March 4
4E	Arkansas State	84
5W	North Texas	76
4W	South Alabama	57
5E	Florida International	60
3E	Middle Tennessee State	77
6W	New Mexico State	63

Quarterfinals; March 5 March 6
1W	Denver	64
4E	Arkansas State	57
2E	Western Kentucky	78
3W	New Orleans	67
1E	Arkansas-Little Rock	64
5E	Florida International	69
2W	Louisiana-Lafayette	71
E3	Middle Tennessee State	57

Semifinals; March 7
1W	Denver	77
2E	Western Kentucky	68
5E	Florida International	69
2W	Louisiana-Lafayette	80

Championship game March 8
1W	Denver	69
2W	Louisiana-Lafayette	88

== See also ==
- Sun Belt Conference men's basketball tournament
