= 2004–05 Dayton Flyers men's basketball team =

American college basketball season

2004–05 Dayton Flyers men's basketball
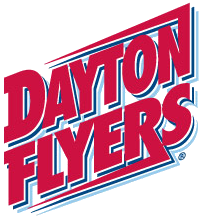
- Conference: Atlantic 10 Conference
- Record: 18–11 (10–6 A-10)
- Head coach: Brian Gregory (2nd season)
- Assistant coaches: Billy Schmidt; Mike Jackson; Dave Wojcik
- Home arena: University of Dayton Arena

2004–05 Atlantic 10 men's basketball standings
	Conf.				Overall
Team	W		L	PCT	W		L	PCT
East
Saint Joseph's	14	–	2	.875	24	–	12	.667
Temple	11	–	5	.688	16	–	14	.533
UMass	9	–	7	.563	16	–	12	.571
Fordham	8	–	8	.500	13	–	16	.448
Rhode Island	4	–	12	.250	6	–	22	.214
St. Bonaventure	1	–	15	.063	2	–	26	.071
West
George Washington †	11	–	5	.688	22	–	8	.733
Dayton	10	–	6	.625	18	–	11	.621
Xavier	10	–	6	.625	17	–	12	.586
Richmond	8	–	8	.500	14	–	15	.483
La Salle	5	–	11	.313	10	–	19	.345
Duquesne	5	–	11	.313	8	–	22	.267
† 2005 Atlantic 10 Tournament winner Rankings from AP Poll

The 2004–05 Dayton Flyers men's basketball team represented the University of Dayton during the 2003–04 NCAA Division I men's basketball season. The Flyers, led by second year head coach Brian Gregory, played their home games at the University of Dayton Arena and were members of the Atlantic 10 Conference. They finished the season 18–11, 10–6 in A-10 play, finishing second in the A-10's West division. The Flyers advanced to the quarterfinals of the Atlantic 10 tournament where their season was ended by Temple. Dayton was not selected to play in a postseason tournament, ending a streak of 5 consecutive postseason appearances.

== Previous season ==
The 2003-04 Dayton Flyers finished the season with an overall record of 24–9, with a record of 12–4 in the Atlantic 10 regular season. The Flyers fell to Xavier in the Atlantic 10 tournament championship game. They received a bid to play in the NCAA tournament where they fell to DePaul in the first round.

== Offseason ==
=== Departures ===
Name	Number	Pos.	Height	Weight	Year	Hometown	Notes
Chris Spears	2	G	6'2"	180	Freshman	Centerville, OH	Dismissed
Ramod Marshall	3	G	6'2"	180	Senior	Charlotte, NC	Graduated
Greg Kohls	13	G	6'2"	170	Senior	Centerville, OH	Graduated
Frank Iguodala	42	F	6'5"	172	Senior	Springfield, IL	Graduated
Keith Waleskowski	45	F	6'8"	231	Senior	Dayton, OH	Graduated
Sean Finn	54	C	7'0"	240	Senior	Hays, KS	Graduated

== Incoming recruits ==
College recruiting information
Name	Hometown	School	Height	Weight	Commit date
Chris Alvarez; F	Blair, NJ	Blair Academy	6 ft 8 in (2.03 m)	200 lb (91 kg)	Oct 6, 2003
Chris Alvarez; F	Recruit ratings: Scout: Rivals: (N/A)				
Jimmy Binnie; F	Johnston, IA	Johnston	6 ft 7 in (2.01 m)	190 lb (86 kg)	Jul 8, 2003
Jimmy Binnie; F	Recruit ratings: Scout: Rivals: (N/A)				
Trent Meacham; G	Champaign, IL	Centennial	6 ft 2 in (1.88 m)	185 lb (84 kg)	Sep 3, 2003
Trent Meacham; G	Recruit ratings: Scout: Rivals: (N/A)				
Norman Plummer; F	Fairfield, OH	Hargrave Military	6 ft 6 in (1.98 m)	200 lb (91 kg)	Jul 22, 2003
Norman Plummer; F	Recruit ratings: Scout: Rivals: (N/A)				
Brian Roberts; G	Toledo, OH	St. John's	6 ft 1 in (1.85 m)	160 lb (73 kg)	Sep 2, 2003
Brian Roberts; G	Recruit ratings: Scout: Rivals: (N/A)				
Overall recruit ranking:
Note: In many cases, Scout, Rivals, 247Sports, On3, and ESPN may conflict in their listings of height and weight.; In these cases, the average was taken. ESPN grades are on a 100-point scale.; Sources: "2004 Team Ranking". Rivals.

== Roster ==
2004–05 Dayton Flyers men's basketball team
Players
Coaches

Pos.	#	Name	Height	Weight	Year	Previous school	Hometown
F	1	Monty Scott	6 ft 6 in (1.98 m)	226 lb (103 kg)	RS So	Reynoldsburg	Reynoldsburg, OH
G	2	Brian Roberts	6 ft 2 in (1.88 m)	175 lb (79 kg)	Fr	St. John's	Toledo, OH
G	4	Jeff Penno (W)	6 ft 5 in (1.96 m)	195 lb (88 kg)	Jr	Alter	Kettering, OH
F	5	Nick Stafford	6 ft 8 in (2.03 m)	210 lb (95 kg)	RS Fr	Worcester	Springfield, MA
G	10	Trent Meacham	6 ft 3 in (1.91 m)	185 lb (84 kg)	Fr	Centennial	Champaign, IL
G	11	Warren Williams	6 ft 0 in (1.83 m)	195 lb (88 kg)	Jr	DeMatha	Gaithersburg, MD
G	14	Mark Jones	6 ft 1 in (1.85 m)	180 lb (82 kg)	Sr	Norwich	Taftville, CT
G	15	Logan White	6 ft 4 in (1.93 m)	180 lb (82 kg)	Jr	University	Cleveland, OH
F	21	Norman Plummer	6 ft 7 in (2.01 m)	215 lb (98 kg)	Fr	Hargrave Military	Fairfield, OH
G	22	Marques Bennett	6 ft 4 in (1.93 m)	200 lb (91 kg)	Jr	Brebeuf Jesuit	Indianapolis, IN
F	32	Chris Alvarez	6 ft 8 in (2.03 m)	210 lb (95 kg)	Fr	Blair	Miami, FL
F	33	Jimmy Binnie	6 ft 6 in (1.98 m)	200 lb (91 kg)	Fr	Johnston	Johnston, IA
G	34	Joaquin Thomas (W)	6 ft 7 in (2.01 m)	223 lb (101 kg)	Fr	Cardinal Hayes	Bronx, NY
C	44	James Cripe	6 ft 10 in (2.08 m)	244 lb (111 kg)	RS So	Loveland	Loveland, OH
G	54	William Brady (W)	6 ft 3 in (1.91 m)	205 lb (93 kg)	Fr	Central Catholic	Bloomington, IL
C	55	Jon Kingston	6 ft 8 in (2.03 m)	238 lb (108 kg)	So	Grandview Heights	Columbus, OH

Head coach

- Brian Gregory (Oakland)

Assistant coach(es)

- Billy Schmidt (Wake Forest)
- Mike Jackson (Detroit Mercy)
- Dave Wojcik (Loyola (MD))

Legend

- (C) Team captain
- (S) Suspended
- (I) Ineligible
- (W) Walk-on
- Injured
- Current redshirt

Roster

== Schedule ==
Date time, TV	Rank^{#}	Opponent^{#}	Result	Record	Site (attendance) city, state
Exhibition
11/06/2004*		Capital	W 73–52	–	UD Arena; Dayton, OH
11/13/2004*; 7:00 pm		Findlay	W 63-61	–	UD Arena; Dayton, OH
Non-conference regular season
11/21/2004*		Eastern Kentucky	L 66–73	0–1	UD Arena (12,254); Dayton, OH
11/27/2004*		Coppin State	W 55–42	1–1	UD Arena (12,011); Dayton, OH
12/01/2004*; WHIO-TV		at DePaul	L 59-70	1–2	Allstate Arena (8,787); Rosemont, IL
12/04/2004*; ESPN		No. 24 Cincinnati	L 55-65	1–3	UD Arena (13,409); Dayton, OH
12/07/2004*; WHIO-TV		Wyoming	W 62–57	2–3	UD Arena (12135); Dayton, OH
12/11/2004*		Texas Southern	W 79-60	3-3	UD Arena (12,145); Dayton, OH
12/18/2004*		at Saint Louis	W 62-54	4–3	Savvis Center (8,108); St. Louis, MO
12/20/2004*		Northwestern State	W 64-55	5–3	UD Arena (11,525); Dayton, OH
12/23/2004*; WHIO-TV		Akron	W 77-66	6–3	UD Arena (12,329); Dayton, OH
12/29/2004*; WHIO-TV		at Vanderbilt	L 74-90	6-4	Memorial Gymnasium (9,311); Nashville, TN
Atlantic 10 regular season
01/05/2005		Duquesne	L 93-94 ^{2ot}	6-5 (0-1)	UD Arena (12,275); Dayton, OH
01/09/2005*		Cornell	W 62–51	7–5	UD Arena (12,587); Dayton, OH
01/12/2005; WHIO-TV		Richmond	W 63–62	8–5 (1-1)	UD Arena (12,761); Dayton, OH
01/15/2005		at Duquesne	W 71–60	9–5 (2-1)	Palumbo Center (3,615); Pittsburgh, PA
01/19/2005; WHIO-TV		Saint Joseph's	W 58-54	10–5 (3-1)	UD Arena (12,506); Dayton, OH
01/22/2005; WHIO-TV		La Salle	W 66-58	11–5 (4-1)	UD Arena (13,409); Dayton, OH
01/27/2005; A-10 TV		at Rhode Island	W 56-49	12–5 (5–1)	Ryan Center (4,370); Kingston, RI
01/30/2005; A-10 TV		at George Washington	L 73-82	12–6 (5–2)	Smith Center (4,236); Washington, D.C.
02/02/2005		Fordham	W 65-47	13–6 (6–2)	UD Arena (12,462); Dayton, OH
02/05/2005; WHIO-TV		at Richmond	L 58–61	13–7 (6–3)	Robins Center (7,385); Richmond, VA
02/09/2005		at Temple	L 70-78	13–8 (6–4)	Liacouras Center (2,954); Philadelphia, PA
02/12/2005; A-10 TV		at La Salle	W 56-45	14-8 (7–4)	Tom Gola Arena (2,712); Philadelphia, PA
02/19/2005; ESPN		Xavier; Blackburn/McCafferty Trophy	W 59-55	15-8 (8-4)	UD Arena (13,409); Dayton, OH
02/22/2005		at St. Bonaventure	W 68–61	16–8 (9–4)	Reilly Center (4,173); Olean, NY
02/26/2005; A-10 TV		George Washington	L 59-62	16–9 (9–5)	UD Arena (13,409); Dayton, OH
03/01/2005		Massachusetts	W 53–52	17–9 (10–5)	UD Arena (12,488); Dayton, OH
03/05/2005; A-10 TV		at Xavier; Blackburn/McCafferty Trophy	L 65-74	17-10 (10–6)	Cintas Center (10,250); Cincinnati, OH
Atlantic 10 tournament
03/09/2005		vs. St. Bonaventure; First Round	W 78-48	18-10	U.S. Bank Arena (5,872); Cincinnati, OH
03/10/2005; A-10 TV		vs. Temple; Quarterfinals	L 51-61	18-11	U.S. Bank Arena (7,221); Cincinnati, OH
*Non-conference game. ^{#}Rankings from AP Poll. (#) Tournament seedings in parentheses. All times are in Eastern Time..
