= 2005 Conference USA men's basketball tournament =

- Classification: Division I
- Season: 2004–05
- Teams: 12
- Site: FedExForum; Memphis, TN
- Champions: Louisville (2nd title)
- Winning coach: Rick Pitino (2nd title)
- MVP: Taquan Dean (Louisville)

2004–05 Conference USA men's basketball standings
	Conf.				Overall
Team	W		L	PCT	W		L	PCT
No. 4 Louisville †	14	–	2	.875	33	–	5	.868
Charlotte	12	–	4	.750	21	–	8	.724
No. 23 Cincinnati	12	–	4	.750	25	–	8	.758
UAB	10	–	6	.625	22	–	11	.667
DePaul	10	–	6	.625	20	–	11	.645
Houston	9	–	7	.563	18	–	14	.563
Memphis	9	–	7	.563	22	–	16	.579
TCU	8	–	8	.500	21	–	14	.600
Marquette	7	–	9	.438	19	–	12	.613
Saint Louis	6	–	10	.375	9	–	21	.300
South Florida	5	–	11	.313	14	–	16	.467
Tulane	4	–	12	.250	10	–	18	.357
East Carolina	4	–	12	.250	9	–	19	.321
Southern Miss	2	–	14	.125	11	–	17	.393
† 2005 Conference USA Tournament winner Rankings from AP Poll

The 2005 Conference USA men's basketball tournament was held March 9–12 at the FedExForum in Memphis, Tennessee.

Top-seeded Louisville defeated hosts Memphis in the championship game, 75–74, to clinch their second Conference USA men's tournament championship. It was the Cardinals' second title in three years.

The Cardinals, in turn, received an automatic bid to the 2005 NCAA tournament. They were joined in the tournament by fellow C-USA members UAB, Charlotte, and Cincinnati, all of whom earned at-large bids. Louisville would ultimately advance to the Final Four.

== Format ==
There were no changes to the tournament format from the previous year.

The top four teams were given byes into the quarterfinal round while the next eight teams were placed into the first round. The two teams with the worst conference records were not invited to the tournament. All remaining tournament seeds were determined by regular season conference records.

== Bracket ==
First round Wednesday, March 9
9	Marquette	57
8	TCU	60
5	DePaul	81
12	Tulane	71
6	Houston	64
11	South Florida	69
7	Memphis	79
10	Saint Louis	59

Quarterfinals; Thursday, March 10
1	#6 Louisville	85
8	TCU	61
5	DePaul	56
4	UAB	59
3	#21 Cincinnati	68
11	South Florida	80
7	Memphis	83
2	#25 Charlotte	69

Semifinals; Friday, March 11
1	#6 Louisville	74
4	UAB	67
11	South Florida	68
7	Memphis	81

Championship; Saturday, March 12
1	#6 Louisville	75
7	Memphis	74
