= 2004–05 Virginia Cavaliers men's basketball team =

American college basketball season

2004–05 Virginia Cavaliers men's basketball
- Conference: Atlantic Coast Conference
- Record: 14–15 (4–12 ACC)
- Head coach: Pete Gillen (7th season)
- Assistant coaches: Walt Fuller (7th season); Alexis Sherard (2nd season); John Fitzpatrick (1st season)
- Home arena: University Hall

2004–05 ACC men's basketball standings
	Conf.				Overall
Team	W		L	PCT	W		L	PCT
No. 2 North Carolina	14	–	2	.875	33	–	4	.892
No. 5 Wake Forest	13	–	3	.813	27	–	6	.818
No. 3 Duke†	11	–	5	.688	27	–	6	.818
Virginia Tech	8	–	8	.500	16	–	14	.533
No. 25 Georgia Tech	8	–	8	.500	20	–	12	.625
Miami (FL)	7	–	9	.438	16	–	13	.552
NC State	7	–	9	.438	21	–	14	.600
Maryland	7	–	9	.438	19	–	13	.594
Clemson	5	–	11	.313	16	–	16	.500
Florida State	4	–	12	.250	14	–	15	.483
Virginia	4	–	12	.250	14	–	15	.483
† 2005 ACC tournament winner Rankings from AP Poll

The 2004–05 Virginia Cavaliers men's basketball team represented the University of Virginia during the 2004–05 NCAA Division I men's basketball season. The team was led by 7th-year head coach Pete Gillen, and played their home games at University Hall in Charlottesville, Virginia as members of the Atlantic Coast Conference. On March 14, three days after the end of the season, Gillen stepped down; he was replaced by DePaul head coach Dave Leitao.

== Last season ==
The Cavaliers had a record of 18–13, with a conference record of 6–10, but the team advanced to the second round of the 2004 National Invitation Tournament, where they lost to Villanova.

== Roster ==
2004–05 Virginia Cavaliers men's basketball team
Players
Coaches

Pos.	#	Name	Height	Weight	Year	Previous school	Hometown
G	2	J. R. Reynolds	6 ft 2.5 in (1.89 m)	200 lb (91 kg)	So	Oak Hill Academy	Roanoke, Virginia
G	12	Billy Campbell	6 ft 0 in (1.83 m)	183 lb (83 kg)	Jr	Paideia School	Atlanta
G	15	T. J. Bannister	5 ft 10.5 in (1.79 m)	170 lb (77 kg)	So	Arlington Country Day	Jacksonville, Florida
C	21	Tunji Soroye	6 ft 11 in (2.11 m)	210 lb (95 kg)	Fr	Montrose Christian	Dugbe Ibadan, Nigeria
G/F	23	Gary Forbes	6 ft 6 in (1.98 m)	210 lb (95 kg)	So	Benjamin Banneker	Brooklyn, New York
G	24	Tryshan Ravenell	6 ft 0 in (1.83 m)	194 lb (88 kg)	So	William Monroe	Charlottesville, Virginia
F	30	Adrian Joseph	6 ft 7 in (2.01 m)	200 lb (91 kg)	Fr	Brewster Academy	San Fernando, Trinidad
F	32	Jason Cain	6 ft 10 in (2.08 m)	205 lb (93 kg)	So	John Bartram	Philadelphia, Pennsylvania
F	33	Devin Smith (C)	6 ft 5 in (1.96 m)	242 lb (110 kg)	Sr	William Penn	New Castle, Delaware
F	34	Jason Clark (C)	6 ft 8 in (2.03 m)	240 lb (109 kg)	Sr	Hargrave Military	Virginia Beach, Virginia
F	42	Mike Forkin	6 ft 5 in (1.96 m)	189 lb (86 kg)	So	Westfield	Centreville, Virginia
G	43	Elton Brown (C)	6 ft 9 in (2.06 m)	255 lb (116 kg)	Sr	Warwick	Newport News, Virginia
F	44	Sean Singletary	6 ft 0 in (1.83 m)	180 lb (82 kg)	Fr	William Penn Charter	Philadelphia, Pennsylvania
F/C	52	Hank Nacey	6 ft 6 in (1.98 m)	215 lb (98 kg)	Jr	Frank W. Cox	Virginia Beach, Virginia
	55	Donte Minter	6 ft 8 in (2.03 m)	245 lb (111 kg)	So	Fork Union Military	Salisbury, North Carolina

Head coach

- Pete Gillen (Fairfield)

Assistant coach(es)

- Walt Fuller (Drexel)
- Alexis Sherard (Saint Michael's)
- John Fitzpatrick (Bowling Green)

Legend

- (C) Team captain
- (S) Suspended
- (I) Ineligible
- (W) Walk-on
- Injured
- Current redshirt

Roster
Last update: 20 December 2014

== Schedule ==
Date time, TV	Rank^{#}	Opponent^{#}	Result	Record	Site (attendance) city, state
Exhibition games
Nov. 5*; 7:30 pm		Lehman	W 121–29		University Hall; Charlottesville, Virginia
Nov. 12*; 7:30 pm		Marymount	W 129–75		University Hall; Charlottesville, Virginia
Regular season
Nov. 19*; 7:30 pm		Robert Morris	W 88–55	1–0	University Hall (7,002); Charlottesville, Virginia
Nov. 21*; 5:00 pm, FSN South		No. 10 Arizona	W 78–60	2–0	University Hall (7,792); Charlottesville, Virginia
Nov. 24*; 8:00 pm, CSN		Appalachian State	W 77–60	3–0	University Hall (6,840); Charlottesville, Virginia
Nov. 28*; 1:00 pm, CSN	No. 24	Richmond	W 85–58	4–0	University Hall (7,506); Charlottesville, Virginia
Dec. 1*; 9:30 pm, ESPN2	No. 24	at Northwestern; ACC–Big Ten Challenge	W 48–44	5–0	Welsh-Ryan Arena (4,283); Evanston, Illinois
Dec. 3*; 7:00 pm, FSN South	No. 24	vs. Auburn	W 89–87	6–0	Siegel Center (7,237); Richmond, Virginia
Dec. 6*; 7:00 pm, ESPN2	No. 19	at Iowa State	L 79–81	6–1	Hilton Coliseum (12,224); Ames, Iowa
Dec. 8*; 7:00 pm	No. 19	Furman	W 79–67	7–1	University Hall (6,972); Charlottesville, Virginia
Dec. 23*; 7:30 pm	No. 25	Loyola Marymount	W 79–77 ^{OT}	8–1	University Hall (8,392); Charlottesville, Virginia
Jan. 2; 5:30 pm, FSN		No. 5 Wake Forest	L 70–89	8–2 (0–1)	University Hall (8,392); Charlottesville, Virginia
Jan. 5*; 9:00 pm, CSN		Western Kentucky	W 80–79 ^{2OT}	9–2 (0–1)	University Hall (6,675); Charlottesville, Virginia
Jan. 8; 8:00 pm, Raycom		at No. 9 Georgia Tech	L 69–92	9–3 (0–2)	Alexander Memorial Coliseum (9,191); Atlanta
Jan. 12; 7:30 pm		Miami	L 80–91	9–4 (0–3)	University Hall (8,079); Charlottesville, Virginia
Jan. 16; 8:00 pm, FSN		at No. 5 Duke	L 66–80	9–5 (0–4)	Cameron Indoor Stadium (9,314); Durham, North Carolina
Jan. 19; 9:00 pm, Raycom		at Maryland	L 68–82	9–6 (0–5)	Comcast Center (17,950); College Park, Maryland
Jan. 22; 7:30 pm		Clemson	W 81–79	10–6 (1–5)	University Hall (7,838); Charlottesville, Virginia
Jan. 27; 8:00 pm, Raycom		at Virginia Tech	L 73–79	10–7 (1–6)	Cassell Coliseum (9,847); Blacksburg, Virginia
Jan. 29; Noon, ESPN		No. 3 North Carolina	L 76–110	10–8 (1–7)	University Hall (7,953); Charlottesville, Virginia
Feb. 2*; 7:30 pm		at Providence	L 79–98	10–9 (1–7)	Dunkin' Donuts Center (8,135); Providence, Rhode Island
Feb. 5; 8:00 pm, Raycom		at NC State	W 64–62	11–9 (2–7)	PNC Arena (16,875); Raleigh, North Carolina
Feb. 9; 7:30 pm		Florida State	W 56–55	12–9 (3–7)	University Hall (6,891); Charlottesville, Virginia
Feb. 12; Noon, Raycom		Virginia Tech	W 65–60	13–9 (4–7)	University Hall (8,223); Charlottesville, Virginia
Feb. 16; 7:00 pm, ESPN		at No. 4 North Carolina	L 61–85	13–10 (4–8)	Dean Smith Center (20,643); Chapel Hill, North Carolina
Feb. 19; 3:30 pm, CBS		Maryland	L 89–92	13–11 (4–9)	University Hall (8,218); Charlottesville, Virginia
Feb. 27; 2:00 pm, Raycom		at No. 6 Wake Forest	L 68–90	13–12 (4–10)	LJVM Coliseum (13,692); Winston-Salem, North Carolina
Mar. 2; 9:00 pm, RSN		NC State	L 72–82	13–13 (4–11)	University Hall (7,482); Charlottesville, Virginia
Mar. 6; 2:00 pm, Raycom		at Florida State	L 63–68	13–14 (4–12)	Donald L. Tucker Center (4,797); Tallahassee, Florida
ACC Tournament
Mar. 10; 7:00 pm, ESPN		vs. Miami; ACC Tournament first round	W 66–65	14–14	MCI Center (20,301); Washington, D.C.
Mar. 11; 9:30 pm, Raycom/ESPN2		vs. No. 5 Duke; ACC Tournament Quarterfinal	L 64–76	14–15	MCI Center (20,301); Washington, D.C.
*Non-conference game. (#) Tournament seedings in parentheses. All times are in Eastern Time.
