= 2004–05 Wake Forest Demon Deacons men's basketball team =

American college basketball season

2004–05 Wake Forest Demon Deacons men's basketball

Preseason NIT champions

NCAA tournament, second round
- Conference: Atlantic Coast Conference

Ranking
- Coaches: No. 11
- AP: No. 5
- Record: 27–6 (13–3 ACC)
- Head coach: Skip Prosser (4th season)
- Assistant coach: Dino Gaudio (4th season)
- Home arena: Lawrence Joel Veterans Memorial Coliseum (Capacity: 14,655)

2004–05 ACC men's basketball standings
	Conf.				Overall
Team	W		L	PCT	W		L	PCT
No. 2 North Carolina	14	–	2	.875	33	–	4	.892
No. 5 Wake Forest	13	–	3	.813	27	–	6	.818
No. 3 Duke†	11	–	5	.688	27	–	6	.818
Virginia Tech	8	–	8	.500	16	–	14	.533
No. 25 Georgia Tech	8	–	8	.500	20	–	12	.625
Miami (FL)	7	–	9	.438	16	–	13	.552
NC State	7	–	9	.438	21	–	14	.600
Maryland	7	–	9	.438	19	–	13	.594
Clemson	5	–	11	.313	16	–	16	.500
Florida State	4	–	12	.250	14	–	15	.483
Virginia	4	–	12	.250	14	–	15	.483
† 2005 ACC tournament winner Rankings from AP Poll

The 2004–05 Wake Forest Demon Deacons men's basketball team represented Wake Forest University in the 2004–05 season. Led by head coach Skip Prosser and Sophomore Chris Paul, the Demon Deacons put together their most successful season since their 1996–97 Campaign as led by Dave Odom and Tim Duncan. The efforts of Paul earned him a consensus All-American selection, and named him ACC Player of the year. After the season, Paul declared for the NBA draft, and the New Orleans Hornets (now New Orleans Pelicans) selected him fourth overall.

== Roster ==
2004–05 Wake Forest Demon Deacons men's basketball team
Players
Coaches

Pos.	#	Name	Height	Weight	Year	Previous school	Hometown
SF	0	Chris Ellis	6 ft 9 in (2.06 m)	261 lb (118 kg)	Jr	Marietta High School	Marietta, Georgia
SG	1	Justin Gray	6 ft 2 in (1.88 m)	194 lb (88 kg)	Jr	Oak Hill Academy	Charlotte, North Carolina
PG	3	Chris Paul	6 ft 0 in (1.83 m)	175 lb (79 kg)	So	West Forsyth	Lewisville, North Carolina
SG	4	Taron Downey	6 ft 2 in (1.88 m)	190 lb (86 kg)	Sr	Fork Union Military Academy	Oxford, North Carolina

Head coach

- Skip Prosser

Assistant coach(es)

Legend

- (C) Team captain
- (S) Suspended
- (I) Ineligible
- (W) Walk-on
- Injured
- Current redshirt

Roster
Last update: August 22, 2020

== Schedule and results ==
Date time, TV	Rank^{#}	Opponent^{#}	Result	Record	Site city, state
Regular Season
Nov 15, 2004*; 7:02 p.m.	No. 2	George Washington	W 97–76	1–0	LJVM Coliseum; Winston-Salem, North Carolina
Nov 18, 2004*	No. 2	VCU	W 81–67	2–0	LJVM Coliseum; Winston-Salem, North Carolina
Nov 22, 2004*	No. 1	Yale	W 99–72	3–0	LJVM Coliseum; Winston-Salem, North Carolina
Nov 24, 2004*	No. 1	vs. Providence; Preseason NIT	W 79–67	4–0	Madison Square Garden; New York, New York
Nov 26, 2004*	No. 1	vs. No. 18 Arizona; Preseason NIT	W 63–60	5–0	Madison Square Garden; New York, New York
Dec 1, 2004*; 7:00 p.m.	No. 1	at No. 5 Illinois	L 73–91	5–1	Assembly Hall; Champaign, Illinois
Dec 4, 2004*; 2:00 p.m.	No. 1	Richmond	W 90–73	6–1	LJVM Coliseum; Winston-Salem, North Carolina
ACC tournament
Mar 11, 2005*	No. 5	vs. NC State; Quarterfinals	L 65–81	26–5	Verizon Center; Washington, D.C.
NCAA tournament
Mar 17, 2005*	(2 ABQ) No. 5	vs. (15 ABQ) Chattanooga; First round	W 70–54	27–5	Wolstein Center; Cleveland, Ohio
Mar 19, 2005*	(2 ABQ) No. 5	vs. (7 ABQ) West Virginia; Second round	L 105–111 ^{2OT}	27–6	Wolstein Center; Cleveland, Ohio
*Non-conference game. ^{#}Rankings from AP Poll. (#) Tournament seedings in parentheses. ABQ=Albuquerque.

== Tournament results ==
ACC Tournament
Vs. NC State @ MCI Center, Washington D.C. - L, 65-81
NCAA Tournament
First Round Vs. Chattanooga @ Wolstein Center, Cleveland, OH - W, 70-54
Second Round Vs. West Virginia @ Wolstein Center, Cleveland, OH - L, 105-111 2OT

== Awards and honors ==
- Chris Paul – Consensus First-team All-American
