= 2004–05 North Carolina Tar Heels men's basketball team =

American college basketball season

2004–05 North Carolina Tar Heels men's basketball

NCAA tournament National Champions ACC regular season champions Maui Invitational champions

National Championship Game, W 75–70 vs. Illinois
- Conference: Atlantic Coast Conference

Ranking
- Coaches: No. 1
- AP: No. 2
- Record: 33–4 (14–2 ACC)
- Head coach: Roy Williams (2nd season)
- Assistant coaches: Joe Holladay; Steve Robinson; C. B. McGrath
- Home arena: Dean Smith Center

2004–05 ACC men's basketball standings
	Conf.				Overall
Team	W		L	PCT	W		L	PCT
No. 2 North Carolina	14	–	2	.875	33	–	4	.892
No. 5 Wake Forest	13	–	3	.813	27	–	6	.818
No. 3 Duke†	11	–	5	.688	27	–	6	.818
Virginia Tech	8	–	8	.500	16	–	14	.533
No. 25 Georgia Tech	8	–	8	.500	20	–	12	.625
Miami (FL)	7	–	9	.438	16	–	13	.552
NC State	7	–	9	.438	21	–	14	.600
Maryland	7	–	9	.438	19	–	13	.594
Clemson	5	–	11	.313	16	–	16	.500
Florida State	4	–	12	.250	14	–	15	.483
Virginia	4	–	12	.250	14	–	15	.483
† 2005 ACC tournament winner Rankings from AP Poll

The 2004–05 North Carolina Tar Heels men's basketball team represented University of North Carolina. The head coach was Roy Williams. The team played its home games at the Dean Smith Center in Chapel Hill, North Carolina, and was a member of the Atlantic Coast Conference.

== Roster ==
Name	#	Position	Height	Weight	Year	Home town	High school
Jesse Holley	0	Guard	6–3	190	Sophomore	Roselle, New Jersey	Abraham Clark
Melvin Scott	1	Guard	6–2	190	Senior	Baltimore	Southern
Raymond Felton	2	Guard	6–1	198	Junior	Latta, South Carolina	Latta
Reyshawn Terry	3	Forward	6–8	214	Sophomore	Winston-Salem, North Carolina	R. J. Reynolds
Brooks Foster	4		6–2	190	Freshman	Boiling Springs, South Carolina	Boiling Springs
Jackie Manuel	5	Guard/forward	6–5	189	Senior	West Palm Beach, Florida	Cardinal Newman
Quentin Thomas	11	Guard	6–3	175	Freshman	Oakland, California	Oakland Technical Senior
Jawad Williams	21	Forward	6–9	218	Senior	Cleveland, Ohio	St. Edward
Wes Miller	22	Guard	5–11	185	Sophomore	Charlotte, North Carolina	New Hampton Prep (N. H.)
Marvin Williams	24	Forward	6–9	230	Freshman	Bremerton, Washington	Bremerton
Damion Grant	25	Center	6–11	267	Junior	Portland, Jamaica	Brewster Academy (N. H.)
Rashad McCants	32	Forward/guard	6–4	207	Junior	Asheville, North Carolina	New Hampton Prep (N. H.)
David Noel	34	Forward	6–6	224	Junior	Durham, North Carolina	Southern Durham
C. J. Hooker	35	Guard	6–2	188	Senior	Palmer, AK	Palmer
Byron Sanders	41	Forward	6–9	230	Junior	Gulfport, Mississippi	Harrison Central
Sean May	42	Forward/center	6–9	266	Junior	Bloomington, Indiana	Bloomington North

== Schedule ==
Date time, TV	Rank^{#}	Opponent^{#}	Result	Record	Site (attendance) city, state
Exhibition
11/05/04*; 2:00 pm	No. 4	Winston-Salem State	W 113–54		Dean E. Smith Center (15,125); Chapel Hill, North Carolina
11/12/04*; 7:00 pm	No. 4	Mount Olive	W 100–69		Dean E. Smith Center (14,457); Chapel Hill, North Carolina
Regular season
11/19/04*; 9:00 pm, CSTV	No. 4	at Santa Clara; Pete Newell Challenge	L 66–77	0–1	The Arena in Oakland (12,313); Oakland, California
11/22/04*; 9:00 pm, ESPN2	No. 4	vs. BYU; Maui Invitational	W 86–50	1–1	Lahaina Civic Center (2,500); Lahaina, HI
11/23/04*; 9:30 pm, ESPN	No. 11	vs. Tennessee; Maui Invitational	W 94–81	2–1	Lahaina Civic Center (2,500); Maui, HI
11/24/04*; 9:30 pm, ESPN	No. 11	vs. Iowa; Maui Invitational	W 106–92	3–1	Lahaina Civic Center (2,500); Maui, HI
11/28/04*; 7:30 pm, FSN	No. 11	USC	W 97–65	4–1	Dean E. Smith Center (19,995); Chapel Hill, North Carolina
12/01/04*; 9:00 pm, ESPN	No. 9	at Indiana; Big Ten/ACC Challenge	W 70–63	5–1	Assembly Hall (17,404); Bloomington, Indiana
12/04/04*; 12:00 pm, CBS	No. 9	No. 8 Kentucky	W 91–78	6–1	Dean E. Smith Center (21,750); Chapel Hill, North Carolina
12/12/04*; 5:30 pm, FSN	No. 8	Loyola (IL)	W 109–60	7–1	Dean E. Smith Center (19,136); Chapel Hill, North Carolina
12/19/04; 3:30 pm, FSN	No. 5	at Virginia Tech	W 85–51	8–1 (1–0)	Cassell Coliseum (9,847); Blacksburg, Virginia
12/21/04*; 7:00 pm, FSN	No. 4	Vermont	W 93–65	9–1 (1–0)	Dean E. Smith Center (19,717); Chapel Hill, North Carolina
12/28/04*; 8:00 pm, JP Sports	No. 4	UNC Wilmington	W 96–75	10–1 (1–0)	Dean E. Smith Center (19,989); Chapel Hill, North Carolina
12/30/04*; 8:00 pm	No. 4	Cleveland State	W 107–64	11–1 (1–0)	Dean E. Smith Center (18,537); Chapel Hill, North Carolina
01/02/05*; 1:00 pm, JP Sports	No. 4	William & Mary	W 105–66	12–1 (1–0)	Dean E. Smith Center (18,418); Chapel Hill, North Carolina
01/08/05; 12:00 pm, ESPN	No. 3	No. 22 Maryland	W 109–75	13–1 (2–0)	Dean E. Smith Center (21,750); Chapel Hill, North Carolina
01/12/05; 7:00 pm, ESPN	No. 3	No. 8 Georgia Tech	W 91–69	14–1 (3–0)	Dean E. Smith Center (21,750); Chapel Hill, North Carolina
01/15/05; 3:30 pm, ABC	No. 3	at No. 4 Wake Forest	L 82–95	14–2 (3–1)	LJVM Coliseum (14,665); Winston-Salem, North Carolina
01/19/05; 9:00 pm, JP Sports	No. 6	at Clemson	W 77–58	15–2 (4–1)	Littlejohn Coliseum (10,000); Clemson, South Carolina
01/22/05; 8:00 pm, JP Sports	No. 6	Miami (FL)	W 87–67	16–2 (5–1)	Dean E. Smith Center (20,714); Chapel Hill, North Carolina
01/29/05; 12:00 pm, ESPN	No. 3	at Virginia	W 110–76	17–2 (6–1)	University Hall (7,953); Charlottesville, Virginia
02/03/05; 7:00 pm, ESPN	No. 2	NC State; Carolina-State rivalry	W 95–71	18–2 (7–1)	Dean E. Smith Center (21,750); Chapel Hill, North Carolina
02/06/05; 2:00 pm, FSN	No. 2	at Florida State	W 81–60	19–2 (8–1)	Donald L. Tucker Center (8,681); Tallahassee, Florida
02/09/05; 9:00 pm, ESPN	No. 2	at No. 7 Duke; Carolina–Duke rivalry	L 70–71	19–3 (8–2)	Cameron Indoor Stadium (9,314); Durham, North Carolina
02/13/05*; 1:00 pm, CBS	No. 2	at No. 19 Connecticut	W 77–70	20–3 (8–2)	Hartford Civic Center (16,294); Hartford, Connecticut
02/16/05; 7:00 pm, ESPN	No. 4	Virginia	W 85–61	21–3 (9–2)	Dean E. Smith Center (20,643); Chapel Hill, North Carolina
02/19/05; 1:00 pm, ABC	No. 4	Clemson	W 88–56	22–3 (10–2)	Dean E. Smith Center (20,323); Chapel Hill, North Carolina
02/22/05; 8:00 pm, JP Sports	No. 2	at NC State; Carolina-State rivalry	W 81–71	23–3 (11–2)	RBC Center (19,722); Raleigh, North Carolina
02/27/05; 5:30 pm, FSN	No. 2	at Maryland	W 85–83	24–3 (12–2)	Comcast Center (17,950); College Park, Maryland
03/03/05; 9:00 pm, JP Sports	No. 2	Florida State	W 91–76	25–3 (13–2)	Dean E. Smith Center (21,243); Chapel Hill, North Carolina
03/06/05; 4:00 pm, CBS	No. 2	No. 6 Duke; Carolina–Duke rivalry	W 75–73	26–3 (14–2)	Dean E. Smith Center (22,125); Chapel Hill, North Carolina
ACC tournament
03/11/05; ESPN2	(1) No. 2	vs. (9) Clemson; Quarterfinals	W 88–81	27–3	MCI Center (20,301); Washington, D.C.
03/12/05; ESPN	(1) No. 2	vs. (5) Georgia Tech; Semifinals	L 75–78	27–4	MCI Center (20,301); Washington, D.C.
NCAA tournament
03/18/05*; 3:00 pm, CBS	(1 S) No. 3	vs. (16 S) Oakland; First Round	W 96–68	28–4	Charlotte Coliseum (23,207); Charlotte, North Carolina
03/20/05*; 2:30 pm, CBS	(1 S) No. 3	vs. (9 S) Iowa State; Second Round	W 92–65	29–4	Charlotte Coliseum (23,207); Charlotte, North Carolina
03/25/05*; 10:00 pm, CBS	(1 S) No. 3	vs. (5 S) No. 19 Villanova; Sweet Sixteen	W 67–66	30–4	Carrier Dome (30,916); Syracuse, New York
03/27/05*; 2:40 pm, CBS	(1 S) No. 3	vs. (6 S) No. 20 Wisconsin; Elite Eight	W 88–82	31–4	Carrier Dome (30,132); Syracuse, New York
04/02/05*; 8:49 pm, CBS	(1 S) No. 3	vs. (5 A) No. 15 Michigan State; Final Four	W 87–71	32–4	Edward Jones Dome (47,754); St. Louis, Missouri
04/04/05*; 9:21 pm, CBS	(1 S) No. 3	vs. (1 C) No. 1 Illinois; National Championship Game	W 75–70	33–4	Edward Jones Dome (47,262); St. Louis, Missouri
*Non-conference game. ^{#}Rankings from AP Poll. (#) Tournament seedings in parentheses. All times are in Eastern Time Rank in NCAA tournament indicates seed in the region, S-Syracuse region, A-Austin region, C-Chicago region.

== NCAA basketball tournament ==
- Syracuse
  - North Carolina 96, Oakland 68
  - North Carolina 92, Iowa State 65
  - North Carolina 67, Villanova 66
  - North Carolina 88, Wisconsin 82
- Final Four
  - North Carolina 87, Michigan State 71
  - North Carolina 75, Illinois 70

== Awards and honors ==
- Sean May, NCAA Men's MOP Award
- Raymond Felton, Bob Cousy Award

== Team players drafted into the NBA ==
Year	Round	Pick	Player	NBA club
2005	1	2	Marvin Williams	Atlanta Hawks
2005	1	5	Raymond Felton	Charlotte Bobcats
2005	1	13	Sean May	Charlotte Bobcats
2005	1	14	Rashad McCants	Minnesota Timberwolves
2006	2	39	David Noel	Milwaukee Bucks
2007	2	44	Reyshawn Terry	Orlando Magic
