= 2004–05 Cincinnati Bearcats men's basketball team =

American college basketball season

2004–05 Cincinnati Bearcats men's basketball

NCAA tournament, second round
- Conference: Conference USA
- American

Ranking
- Coaches: No. 25
- AP: No. 23
- Record: 25–8 (12–4 C-USA)
- Head coach: Bob Huggins (15th season)
- Assistant coaches: Mick Cronin (9th season); Andy Kennedy (4th season)
- Home arena: Myrl Shoemaker Center

2004–05 Conference USA men's basketball standings
	Conf.				Overall
Team	W		L	PCT	W		L	PCT
No. 4 Louisville †	14	–	2	.875	33	–	5	.868
Charlotte	12	–	4	.750	21	–	8	.724
No. 23 Cincinnati	12	–	4	.750	25	–	8	.758
UAB	10	–	6	.625	22	–	11	.667
DePaul	10	–	6	.625	20	–	11	.645
Houston	9	–	7	.563	18	–	14	.563
Memphis	9	–	7	.563	22	–	16	.579
TCU	8	–	8	.500	21	–	14	.600
Marquette	7	–	9	.438	19	–	12	.613
Saint Louis	6	–	10	.375	9	–	21	.300
South Florida	5	–	11	.313	14	–	16	.467
Tulane	4	–	12	.250	10	–	18	.357
East Carolina	4	–	12	.250	9	–	19	.321
Southern Miss	2	–	14	.125	11	–	17	.393
† 2005 Conference USA Tournament winner Rankings from AP Poll

The 2004–05 Cincinnati Bearcats men's basketball team represented University of Cincinnati as a member of Conference USA during the 2004–05 NCAA Division I men's basketball season. The head coach was Bob Huggins, serving in his 15th and final year at the school. The team finished third in the American division of the conference regular season standings and lost in the quarterfinals of the Conference USA tournament. Cincinnati received an at-large bid to the NCAA tournament as No. 7 seed in the Austin region. After an opening round win over No. 10 seed Iowa, Cincinnati was beaten in the second round by No. 2 seed Kentucky, 69–60. The Bearcats finished with a 25–8 record (12–4 C-USA).

== Roster ==
2004–05 Cincinnati Bearcats men's basketball team
Players
Coaches

Pos.	#	Name	Height	Weight	Year	Hometown
G	1	Chadd Moore	6 ft 2 in (1.88 m)	175 lb (79 kg)	Jr	Lee High School	Huntsville, Alabama
G	13	Jihad Muhammad	5 ft 11 in (1.8 m)	175 lb (79 kg)	Jr	San Jacinto College	Plainfield, New Jersey
F	14	Eric Hicks (C)	6 ft 7 in (2.01 m)	245 lb (111 kg)	Jr	James B. Dudley High School	Greensboro, North Carolina
F	21	James White	6 ft 7 in (2.01 m)	200 lb (91 kg)	Jr	Florida	Washington, D.C.
F	23	Ronald Allen	6 ft 9 in (2.06 m)	225 lb (102 kg)	So	Xavier University of Louisiana	Los Angeles, California
F	30	Cedric McGowan	6 ft 6 in (1.98 m)	230 lb (104 kg)	So	Kilgore College	Miami, Florida
G	33	Armein Kirkland	6 ft 8 in (2.03 m)	205 lb (93 kg)	Jr	Robert E. Lee High School	Tyler, Texas
F	51	Erick Murray (W)	6 ft 5 in (1.96 m)	230 lb (104 kg)	So	Westerville North High School	Westerville, Ohio
F	53	Scott Benken (W)	—	215 lb (98 kg)	Jr	Vanderbilt	Cincinnati, Ohio
F	54	Jason Maxiell	6 ft 7 in (2.01 m)	250 lb (113 kg)	Sr	Chicago, Illinois

Head coach

- Bob Huggins

Assistant coach(es)

- Mick Cronin
- Andy Kennedy

Legend

- (C) Team captain
- (S) Suspended
- (I) Ineligible
- (W) Walk-on
- Injured
- Current redshirt

== Schedule and results ==
Date time, TV	Rank^{#}	Opponent^{#}	Result	Record	Site city, state
Regular Season
Nov 19, 2004*		Valparaiso	W 88–70	1–0	Myrl Shoemaker Center; Cincinnati, Ohio
Nov 24, 2004*		Northern Iowa	W 76–70 ^{2OT}	2–0	Myrl Shoemaker Center; Cincinnati, Ohio
Nov 27, 2004*		vs. Purdue; Wooden Tradition	W 79–59	3–0	Conseco Fieldhouse; Indianapolis, Indiana
Conference USA Tournament
NCAA Tournament
Mar 17, 2005*	(7 AUS)	vs. (10 AUS) Iowa; First Round	W 76–64	25–7	RCA Dome; Indianapolis, Indiana
Mar 19, 2005*	(7 AUS)	vs. (2 AUS) No. 7 Kentucky; Second Round	L 60–69	25–8	RCA Dome; Indianapolis, Indiana
*Non-conference game. ^{#}Rankings from AP Poll. (#) Tournament seedings in parentheses. AUS=Austin.
