= 2005 ACC men's basketball tournament =

Basketball tournament

- 2005 ACC Tournament logo
- Classification: Division I
- Season: 2004–05
- Teams: 11
- Site: MCI Center; Washington, D.C.
- Champions: Duke (15th title)
- Winning coach: Mike Krzyzewski (9th title)
- MVP: JJ Redick (Duke)

The 2005 Atlantic Coast Conference men's basketball tournament took place from March 10 to 13 in Washington, D.C., at the MCI Center. This was the first time the tournament was played in Washington itself, as the previous ACC Tournaments in the D.C. area were played in suburban Landover, Maryland, at the Capital Centre. Duke won the tournament, defeating Georgia Tech in the championship game. Duke's JJ Redick won the tournament's Most Valuable Player award.

The 2005 ACC Tournament was the first, and only, ACC Tournament with 11 teams participating. Conference newcomers Miami and Virginia Tech participated in their first ACC tournament. Their debuts were unsuccessful, as both teams failed to win a game. The tournament expanded to 12 teams the following season, as Boston College joined from the Big East Conference.

Wake Forest's Chris Paul was suspended for his team's quarterfinal game against NC State for punching Julius Hodge in the groin in the season finale between the two teams. NC State took advantage of his absence, defeating Wake Forest en route to the semifinal round.

2004–05 ACC men's basketball standings
	Conf.				Overall
Team	W		L	PCT	W		L	PCT
No. 2 North Carolina	14	–	2	.875	33	–	4	.892
No. 5 Wake Forest	13	–	3	.813	27	–	6	.818
No. 3 Duke†	11	–	5	.688	27	–	6	.818
Virginia Tech	8	–	8	.500	16	–	14	.533
No. 25 Georgia Tech	8	–	8	.500	20	–	12	.625
Miami (FL)	7	–	9	.438	16	–	13	.552
NC State	7	–	9	.438	21	–	14	.600
Maryland	7	–	9	.438	19	–	13	.594
Clemson	5	–	11	.313	16	–	16	.500
Florida State	4	–	12	.250	14	–	15	.483
Virginia	4	–	12	.250	14	–	15	.483
† 2005 ACC tournament winner Rankings from AP Poll

== Bracket ==
First round March 10, 2005
8	Maryland	72
9	Clemson	84
7	NC State	70
10	Florida State	54
6	Miami	65
11	Virginia	66

Quarterfinals; March 11, 2005
1	#2 North Carolina	88
9	Clemson	81
4	Virginia Tech	54
5	Georgia Tech	73
2	#5 Wake Forest	65
7	NC State	81
3	#3 Duke	76
11	Virginia	64

Semifinals; March 12, 2005
1	#2 North Carolina	75
5	Georgia Tech	78
7	NC State	69
3	#3 Duke	76

Championship Game; March 13, 2005
5	Georgia Tech	64
3	#3 Duke	69

AP Rankings at time of tournament
