= 2004–05 George Washington Colonials men's basketball team =

American college basketball season

2004–05 George Washington Colonials men's basketball

Atlantic 10 West division champions Atlantic 10 tournament champions

NCAA tournament, first round
- Conference: Atlantic 10 Conference
- West
- Record: 22–8 (11–5 A-10)
- Head coach: Karl Hobbs (4th season)
- Home arena: Charles E. Smith Center

2004–05 Atlantic 10 men's basketball standings
	Conf.				Overall
Team	W		L	PCT	W		L	PCT
East
Saint Joseph's	14	–	2	.875	24	–	12	.667
Temple	11	–	5	.688	16	–	14	.533
UMass	9	–	7	.563	16	–	12	.571
Fordham	8	–	8	.500	13	–	16	.448
Rhode Island	4	–	12	.250	6	–	22	.214
St. Bonaventure	1	–	15	.063	2	–	26	.071
West
George Washington †	11	–	5	.688	22	–	8	.733
Dayton	10	–	6	.625	18	–	11	.621
Xavier	10	–	6	.625	17	–	12	.586
Richmond	8	–	8	.500	14	–	15	.483
La Salle	5	–	11	.313	10	–	19	.345
Duquesne	5	–	11	.313	8	–	22	.267
† 2005 Atlantic 10 Tournament winner Rankings from AP Poll

The 2004–05 George Washington Colonials men's basketball team represented George Washington University in the 2004–05 NCAA Division I men's basketball season. The Colonials, led by head coach Karl Hobbs, played their home games at the Charles E. Smith Center in Washington, D.C., as members of the Atlantic 10 Conference.

The Colonials finished the regular season at 11–5 in conference play, registering a 19–7 overall record going into the postseason. They defeated Fordham, Temple, and Saint Joseph's to win the Atlantic 10 tournament and secure the conference's automatic bid to the NCAA tournament. Playing as the 12 seed in the West region, George Washington lost to No. 5 seed Georgia Tech, 80–68.

== Roster ==
2004–05 George Washington Colonials men's basketball team
Players
Coaches

Pos.	#	Name	Height	Weight	Year	Hometown
F	1	Omar Williams	6 ft 9 in (2.06 m)	—	Jr	Philadelphia, Pennsylvania
F	2	J. R. Pinnock	6 ft 5 in (1.96 m)	—	So	McDonough, Georgia
F	3	Mike Hall	6 ft 8 in (2.03 m)	—	Jr	Chicago, Illinois
G	5	T. J. Thompson	5 ft 11 in (1.8 m)	180 lb (82 kg)	Sr	Germantown, Maryland
F	13	Alex Kireev	6 ft 11 in (2.11 m)	—	Jr	Mykolaiv, Ukraine
F	21	Pops Mensah-Bonsu	6 ft 9 in (2.06 m)	—	Jr	London, England
G	25	Carl Elliott	6 ft 4 in (1.93 m)	—	So	Brooklyn, New York
G	33	Maureece Rice	6 ft 1 in (1.85 m)	—	Fr	Philadelphia, Pennsylvania
F	42	Dokun Akingbade	6 ft 9 in (2.06 m)	—	Jr	Riverdale, Maryland

Head coach

- Karl Hobbs (Connecticut)

Assistant coach(es)

Legend

- (C) Team captain
- (S) Suspended
- (I) Ineligible
- (W) Walk-on
- Injured
- Current redshirt

Roster

== Schedule and results ==
Date time, TV	Rank^{#}	Opponent^{#}	Result	Record	Site (attendance) city, state
Regular season
Nov 15, 2004*		at No. 2 Wake Forest	L 76–97	0–1	Lawrence Joel Veterans Memorial Coliseum; Winston-Salem, North Carolina
Atlantic 10 tournament
Mar 10, 2005*		vs. Fordham; Quarterfinals	W 79–63	20–7	Riverfront Coliseum; Cincinnati, Ohio
Mar 11, 2005*		vs. Temple; Semifinals	W 77–58	21–7	Riverfront Coliseum; Cincinnati, Ohio
Mar 12, 2005*		vs. Saint Joseph's; Championship game	W 76–67	22–7	Riverfront Coliseum; Cincinnati, Ohio
NCAA tournament
Mar 18, 2005*	(12 W)	vs. (5 W) No. 25 Georgia Tech; First round	L 68–80	22–8	Bridgestone Arena; Nashville, Tennessee
*Non-conference game. ^{#}Rankings from AP Poll. (#) Tournament seedings in parentheses. W=West. All times are in Eastern Time.
