= 2004–05 Charlotte 49ers men's basketball team =

American college basketball season

2004–05 Charlotte 49ers men's basketball

NCAA tournament, First Round
- Conference: Conference USA
- American
- Record: 21–8 (12–4 C-USA)
- Head coach: Bobby Lutz (7th season)
- Assistant coach: Benny Moss (5th season)
- Home arena: Dale F. Halton Arena

2004–05 Conference USA men's basketball standings
	Conf.				Overall
Team	W		L	PCT	W		L	PCT
No. 4 Louisville †	14	–	2	.875	33	–	5	.868
Charlotte	12	–	4	.750	21	–	8	.724
No. 23 Cincinnati	12	–	4	.750	25	–	8	.758
UAB	10	–	6	.625	22	–	11	.667
DePaul	10	–	6	.625	20	–	11	.645
Houston	9	–	7	.563	18	–	14	.563
Memphis	9	–	7	.563	22	–	16	.579
TCU	8	–	8	.500	21	–	14	.600
Marquette	7	–	9	.438	19	–	12	.613
Saint Louis	6	–	10	.375	9	–	21	.300
South Florida	5	–	11	.313	14	–	16	.467
Tulane	4	–	12	.250	10	–	18	.357
East Carolina	4	–	12	.250	9	–	19	.321
Southern Miss	2	–	14	.125	11	–	17	.393
† 2005 Conference USA Tournament winner Rankings from AP Poll

The 2004–05 UNC Charlotte 49ers men's basketball team represented the University of North Carolina at Charlotte in the 2004–05 college basketball season. This was head coach Bobby Lutz's seventh season at the school. The 49ers competed in Conference USA and played their home games at Dale F. Halton Arena. They finished the season 21–8 (12–4 in C-USA play) and received an at-large bid to the 2005 NCAA tournament as No. 7 seed in the Syracuse region. The 49ers were defeated by No. 10 seed NC State, 75–63, in the opening round.

== Roster ==
2004–05 Charlotte 49ers men's basketball team
Players
Coaches

Pos.	#	Name	Height	Weight	Year	Hometown
F	3	Curtis Withers	6 ft 8 in (2.03 m)	245 lb (111 kg)	Jr	Charlotte, North Carolina
G	13	Eddie Basden	6 ft 5 in (1.96 m)	215 lb (98 kg)	Sr	Greenbelt, Maryland

Head coach

- Bobby Lutz

Assistant coach(es)

- Benny Moss (Pfeiffer)

Legend

- (C) Team captain
- (S) Suspended
- (I) Ineligible
- (W) Walk-on
- Injured
- Current redshirt

Roster

== Schedule and results ==
Date time, TV	Rank^{#}	Opponent^{#}	Result	Record	Site city, state
Regular season
Nov 19, 2004*		Long Beach State	W 93–64	1–0	Dale F. Halton Arena (8,202); Charlotte, North Carolina
Nov 22, 2004*		Rutgers	L 71–73	1–1	Dale F. Halton Arena (6,653); Charlotte, North Carolina
Nov 27, 2004*		at Valparaiso	W 85–71	2–1	Athletics-Recreation Center (3,801); Valparaiso, Indiana
Dec 1, 2004*		Louisiana-Lafayette	W 84–68	3–1	Dale F. Halton Arena (6,059); Charlotte, North Carolina
Dec 4, 2004*		No. 22 Alabama	L 101–102 ^{3OT}	3–2	Dale F. Halton Arena (8,511); Charlotte, North Carolina
Dec 8, 2004*		at Davidson	W 87–68	4–2	Belk Arena (4,664); Davidson, North Carolina
Dec 11, 2004*		Georgia State	W 80–65	5–2	Dale F. Halton Arena (7,144); Charlotte, North Carolina
Dec 19, 2004*		UNC Asheville	W 64–52	6–2	Dale F. Halton Arena (6,046); Charlotte, North Carolina
Dec 22, 2004*		at Indiana	W 74–73	7–2	Assembly Hall (11,865); Bloomington, Indiana
Dec 28, 2004*		vs. Yale	W 80–74	8–2	Leavey Center (1,768); Santa Clara, California
Dec 29, 2004*		vs. Central Connecticut State	W 66–52	9–2	Leavey Center (1,537); Santa Clara, California
Jan 8, 2005		East Carolina	W 72–60	10–2 (1–0)	Dale F. Halton Arena (7,175); Charlotte, North Carolina
Jan 12, 2005		at UAB	W 91–85	11–2 (2–0)	Bartow Arena (7,277); Birmingham, Alabama
Jan 15, 2005		Saint Louis	W 65–59	12–2 (3–0)	Dale F. Halton Arena (7,544); Charlotte, North Carolina
Jan 19, 2005		at Cincinnati	L 58–80	12–3 (3–1)	Fifth Third Arena (11,393); Cincinnati, Ohio
Jan 22, 2005		at Marquette	W 76–66	13–3 (4–1)	Bradley Center (12,324); Milwaukee, Wisconsin
Jan 26, 2005		TCU	W 94–87	14–3 (5–1)	Dale F. Halton Arena (6,458); Charlotte, North Carolina
Jan 29, 2005		at East Carolina	L 51–54	14–4 (5–2)	Williams Arena at Minges Coliseum (5,316); Greenville, North Carolina
Feb 5, 2005		Cincinnati	W 91–90	15–4 (6–2)	Dale F. Halton Arena (9,105); Charlotte, North Carolina
Feb 9, 2005		Houston	W 91–71	16–4 (7–2)	Dale F. Halton Arena (5,879); Charlotte, North Carolina
Feb 12, 2005		at Saint Louis	W 83–78 ^{OT}	17–4 (8–2)	Scottrade Center (8,459); St. Louis, Missouri
Feb 16, 2005		DePaul	W 66–62	18–4 (9–2)	Dale F. Halton Arena (9,105); Charlotte, North Carolina
Feb 19, 2005		at Tulane	W 86–67	19–4 (10–2)	Avron B. Fogelman Arena (2,015); New Orleans, Louisiana
Feb 23, 2005		Memphis	W 80–77	20–4 (11–2)	Dale F. Halton Arena (9,105); Charlotte, North Carolina
Feb 26, 2005		Southern Miss	W 91–85	21–4 (12–2)	Dale F. Halton Arena (9,105); Charlotte, North Carolina
Mar 3, 2005		at No. 9 Louisville	L 82–94	21–5 (12–3)	Freedom Hall (20,068); Louisville, Kentucky
Mar 5, 2005		at South Florida	L 73–85	21–6 (12–4)	Sun Dome (3,988); Tampa, Florida
C-USA tournament
Mar 10, 2005*		at Memphis; Quarterfinals	L 69–83	21–7	FedExForum; Memphis, Tennessee
NCAA tournament
Mar 18, 2005*	(7 SYR)	vs. (10 SYR) NC State; First round	L 63–75	21–8	DCU Center (13,008); Worcester, Massachusetts
*Non-conference game. ^{#}Rankings from AP poll. (#) Tournament seedings in parentheses. SYR=Syracuse.
