= Tim Bergstraser =

American basketball coach

Current position
- Title: Head coach
- Team: Denver
- Conference: WCC
- Record: 15–17 (.469)

Playing career
- 2009–2013: St. Cloud State

Coaching career (HC unless noted)
- 2013–2014: St. Cloud State (student assistant)
- 2014–2015: Wisconsin–River Falls (assistant)
- 2015–2017: MSU–Moorhead (graduate assistant)
- 2017–2018: Quincy (assistant)
- 2018–2022: MSU–Moorhead (assistant)
- 2022–2025: MSU–Moorhead
- 2025–present: Denver

Head coaching record
- Overall: 90–39 (.698)
- Tournaments: 3–3 (NCAA Division II)

Accomplishments and honors

Championships
- 2 NSIC tournament (2023, 2025)

Tim Bergstraser is an American college basketball coach who is the head coach of the Denver Pioneers men's basketball team.

== Early life and playing career ==
Bergstraser grew up in St. Cloud, Minnesota and attended Apollo High School.

Bergstraser played college basketball at St. Cloud State. As a freshman, he played in all 34 games of the Huskies games during the team's run to the 2010 NCAA Division II Final Four. He tore the ACL in his left knee during preseason practice and used a medical redshirt during his sophomore season. As a redshirt sophomore, he averaged 12.8 points and 7.5 rebounds per game and was named second team All-Northern Sun Intercollegiate Conference (NSIC). He tore his ACL again in the Huskies' second-round game of the 2012 NCAA Division II tournament. He averaged 5.0 points and 3.4 rebounds per game as a redshirt junior, but tore his ACL for a third time and retired from playing.

== Coaching career ==
Bergstraser began his coaching career as a student assistant for St. Cloud State in 2013 during what would have been his redshirt senior season as a player. He was named an assistant at Wisconsin–River Falls the following season. He took a graduate assistant position at Minnesota State–Moorhead in 2015. Bergstraser was an assistant at Quincy for the 2017–18 season.

Bergstraser returned to Minnesota State–Moorhead in 2018 as the top assistant to Dragons head coach Chad Walthall. He was named head coach following Walthall's retirement at the end of the 2022 season. MSU–Moorhead won the NSIC tournament in his first season as head coach.

Bergstraser was hired as the University of Denver's men's basketball coach in April 2025.

== Head coaching record ==
Record table
Season	Team	Overall	Conference	Standing	Postseason
Minnesota State–Moorhead (Northern Sun Intercollegiate Conference) (2022–2025)
2022–23	Minnesota State–Moorhead	25–7	17–5	2nd	NCAA Division II First Round
2023–24	Minnesota State–Moorhead	25–6	18–4	T–2nd	NCAA Division II Second Round
2024–25	Minnesota State–Moorhead	25–9	15–7	T–2nd	NCAA Division II Sweet 16
Minnesota State–Moorhead:		75–22 (.773)	50–16 (.758)		
Denver Pioneers (Summit League) (2025–2026)
2025–26	Denver	15–17	8–8	T–4th	
Denver:		15–17 (.469)	8–8 (.500)		
Total:		90–39 (.698)			
National champion Postseason invitational champion Conference regular season champion Conference regular season and conference tournament champion Division regular season champion Division regular season and conference tournament champion Conference tournament champion
