= 2004–05 Miami Hurricanes men's basketball team =

American college basketball season

2004–05 Miami Hurricanes men's basketball

NIT, 1st round
- Conference: Atlantic Coast Conference
- Record: 16-13 (7-9 ACC)
- Head coach: Frank Haith
- Home arena: BankUnited Center

2004–05 ACC men's basketball standings
	Conf.				Overall
Team	W		L	PCT	W		L	PCT
No. 2 North Carolina	14	–	2	.875	33	–	4	.892
No. 5 Wake Forest	13	–	3	.813	27	–	6	.818
No. 3 Duke†	11	–	5	.688	27	–	6	.818
Virginia Tech	8	–	8	.500	16	–	14	.533
No. 25 Georgia Tech	8	–	8	.500	20	–	12	.625
Miami (FL)	7	–	9	.438	16	–	13	.552
NC State	7	–	9	.438	21	–	14	.600
Maryland	7	–	9	.438	19	–	13	.594
Clemson	5	–	11	.313	16	–	16	.500
Florida State	4	–	12	.250	14	–	15	.483
Virginia	4	–	12	.250	14	–	15	.483
† 2005 ACC tournament winner Rankings from AP Poll

The 2004–05 Miami Hurricanes men's basketball team represented the University of Miami during the 2004–05 NCAA Division I men's basketball season. The Hurricanes, led by head coach Frank Haith, played their home games at the BankUnited Center and are members of the Atlantic Coast Conference.

On November 27, 2004, Miami lost to Xavier 83–70 in the Orange Bowl Basketball Classic.

The Hurricanes finished the season with a 16–13 record. They lost in the ACC tournament 1st round to Virginia 66–65. They lost in the NIT 1st round to South Carolina 69–65 on March 15, 2005.
