= David McClure (basketball) =

American basketball coach

Personal information
- Born: April 1, 1986 (age 40) Danbury, Connecticut
- Listed height: 6 ft 6 in (1.98 m)
- Listed weight: 215 lb (98 kg)

Career information
- High school: Trinity Catholic (Stamford, Connecticut)
- College: Duke (2004–2009)
- NBA draft: 2009: undrafted
- Playing career: 2009–2014
- Position: Forward
- Coaching career: 2014–present

Career history

Playing
- 2009–2010: Austin Toros
- 2010–2011: Neptūnas
- 2011–2012: Nevėžis
- 2012–2013: Neptūnas
- 2013–2014: Šiauliai

Coaching
- 2014–2016: San Antonio Spurs (player development)
- 2016–2018: Indiana Pacers (player development)
- 2018–2019: Indiana Pacers (assistant)
- 2019–2023: Memphis Grizzlies (assistant)

David James McClure (born April 1, 1986) is an American basketball coach and former player. He played college basketball at Duke before going on to play professionally in Lithuania. He is currently the head coach of the Saitama Broncos of the B.League One in Japan.

== College career ==
At Duke, McClure was a role player for the program who was best known for his ability to guard multiple positions. His collegiate highlight came in 2007 against 17th-ranked Clemson when he made the game winning shot as the buzzer sounded to give Duke the victory.

== Professional career ==
After failing to secure an invitation to the Portsmouth Invitational Tournament, McClure went spent one season with the Austin Toros of the NBA D-League before going on to play for professional teams in Lithuania.

== Coaching career ==
=== San Antonio Spurs ===
After going through six knee surgeries, including two on both knees his final season playing, McClure joined the coaching ranks of the San Antonio Spurs with the help of Spurs assistant Chip Engelland, a fellow Duke alum who he met while attending the school's fantasy camp. With the Spurs, he worked as a player development coach and a video coordinator for Spurs assistant Ime Udoka, while also helping Spurs player Manu Ginóbili recover from a stress fracture in his leg.

=== Indiana Pacers ===
McClure was named to the coaching staff of the Indiana Pacers in 2016 as a player development coach. He was promoted to assistant coach before the 2018–2019 season.

=== Memphis Grizzlies ===
McClure joined the Memphis Grizzlies coaching staff in 2019. The move reunited him with Taylor Jenkins, who was an assistant coach with the Austin Toros when McClure was a member of the team.

=== Chiba Jets ===
McClure served as assistant coach for the Chiba Jets during the 2024-25 and 2025-26 seasons.

=== Saitama Broncos ===
McClure was named head coach of the Saitama Broncos on July 1, 2026.
