= 2004–05 Louisville Cardinals men's basketball team =

American college basketball season

2004–05 Louisville Cardinals men's basketball

NCAA Albuquerque Regional Champions Conference USA tournament champions Conference USA regular season champions

NCAA tournament, Final Four
- Conference: Conference USA

Ranking
- Coaches: No. 3
- AP: No. 4
- Record: 33–5 (14–2 CUSA)
- Head coach: Rick Pitino (4th season)
- Home arena: Freedom Hall

2004–05 Conference USA men's basketball standings
	Conf.				Overall
Team	W		L	PCT	W		L	PCT
No. 4 Louisville †	14	–	2	.875	33	–	5	.868
Charlotte	12	–	4	.750	21	–	8	.724
No. 23 Cincinnati	12	–	4	.750	25	–	8	.758
UAB	10	–	6	.625	22	–	11	.667
DePaul	10	–	6	.625	20	–	11	.645
Houston	9	–	7	.563	18	–	14	.563
Memphis	9	–	7	.563	22	–	16	.579
TCU	8	–	8	.500	21	–	14	.600
Marquette	7	–	9	.438	19	–	12	.613
Saint Louis	6	–	10	.375	9	–	21	.300
South Florida	5	–	11	.313	14	–	16	.467
Tulane	4	–	12	.250	10	–	18	.357
East Carolina	4	–	12	.250	9	–	19	.321
Southern Miss	2	–	14	.125	11	–	17	.393
† 2005 Conference USA Tournament winner Rankings from AP Poll

The 2004–05 Louisville Cardinals men's basketball team represented the University of Louisville during the 2004–05 NCAA Division I men's basketball season, Louisville's 91st season of intercollegiate competition. The Cardinals competed in Conference USA and were coached by Rick Pitino, who was in his fourth season. The team played home games at Freedom Hall.

The Cardinals won the Conference USA tournament championship (their 2nd), defeating Memphis 75–74. Louisville defeated West Virginia 93–85 (OT) to win the NCAA Tournament Albuquerque Regional and advance to the Final Four (their 8th) where they fell to eventual runner-up Illinois 72–57. The Cardinals finished with a 33–5 (14–2) record.

== Roster ==
2004–05 Louisville Cardinals men's basketball team
Players	Coaches
Pos. / # / Name / Height / Weight / Year / Previous school / Hometown; SF / 32 / Francisco García / 6 ft 7 in (2.01 m) / 195 lb (88 kg) / Jr	Head coach: Rick Pitino (UMass); Assistant coach(es) Legend: (C) Team captain; (S) Suspended; (I) Ineligible; (W) Walk-on; Injured; Current redshirt

== Schedule and results ==
Date time, TV	Rank^{#}	Opponent^{#}	Result	Record	Site city, state
Regular season
Nov 20, 2004*	No. 14	at BYU-Hawaii	W 89–79	1–0	George Q. Cannon Activities Center; Laie, Hawaii
Nov 22, 2004*	No. 14	vs. Iowa; Maui Invitational Tournament	L 71–76	1–1	Lahaina Civic Center; Lahaina, Hawaii
Nov 23, 2004*	No. 14	vs. Chaminade; Maui Invitational Tournament	W 93–63	2–1	Lahaina Civic Center; Lahaina, Hawaii
Nov 24, 2004*	No. 14	vs. Stanford; Maui Invitational Tournament	W 82–67	3–1	Lahaina Civic Center; Lahaina, Hawaii
Dec 4, 2004*	No. 17	Lafayette	W 98–57	4–1	Freedom Hall; Louisville, Kentucky
Dec 11, 2004*	No. 13	at Florida	W 74–70	5–1	Stephen C. O'Connell Center; Gainesville, Florida
Dec 14, 2004*	No. 13	North Carolina A&T	W 85–51	6–1	Freedom Hall; Louisville, Kentucky
Dec 18, 2004*	No. 13	No. 9 Kentucky	L 58–60	6–2	Freedom Hall; Louisville, Kentucky
Dec 21, 2004*	No. 18	IUPUI	W 80–60	7–2	Freedom Hall; Louisville, Kentucky
Dec 22, 2004*	No. 18	Austin Peay	W 77–49	8–2	Freedom Hall; Louisville, Kentucky
Dec 27, 2004*	No. 19	Morehead State	W 104–40	9–2	Freedom Hall; Louisville, Kentucky
Dec 30, 2004*		Eastern Kentucky	W 78–63	10–2	Freedom Hall; Louisville, Kentucky
Jan 2, 2005*		Tennessee State	W 98–64	11–2	Freedom Hall; Louisville, Kentucky
Jan 5, 2005		at Houston	L 67–70	11–3 (0–1)	Hofheinz Pavilion; Houston, Texas
Jan 8, 2005		TCU	W 86–61	12–3 (1–1)	Freedom Hall; Louisville, Kentucky
Jan 11, 2005		at Southern Miss	W 107–62	13–3 (2–1)	Reed Green Coliseum; Hattiesburg, Mississippi
Jan 15, 2005		at No. 18 Cincinnati	W 69–66	14–3 (3–1)	Myrl H. Shoemaker Center; Cincinnati, Ohio
Jan 19, 2005		East Carolina	W 92–41	15–3 (4–1)	Freedom Hall; Louisville, Kentucky
Jan 22, 2005*		Tennessee	W 85–62	16–3	Freedom Hall; Louisville, Kentucky
Jan 26, 2005		Marquette	W 99–52	17–3 (5–1)	Freedom Hall; Louisville, Kentucky
Jan 29, 2005		at Tulane	W 105–69	18–3 (6–1)	Avron B. Fogelman Arena; New Orleans, Louisiana
Feb 2, 2005		No. 18 Cincinnati	W 77–70	19–3 (7–1)	Freedom Hall; Louisville, Kentucky
Feb 5, 2005		at UAB	W 77–73	20–3 (8–1)	Bartow Arena; Birmingham, Alabama
Feb 9, 2005		Memphis	L 68–85	20–4 (8–2)	Freedom Hall; Louisville, Kentucky
Mar 5, 2005	No. 9	at DePaul	W 66–62	26–4 (14–2)	Allstate Arena; Rosemont, Illinois
Conference USA Tournament
Mar 10, 2005*	No. 6	vs. TCU; C-USA Tournament Quarterfinal	W 85–61	27–4	FedExForum; Memphis, Tennessee
Mar 11, 2005*	No. 6	vs. UAB; C-USA Tournament Semifinal	W 74–67	28–4	FedExForum; Memphis, Tennessee
Mar 12, 2005*	No. 6	at Memphis; C-USA tournament championship	W 75–74	29–4	FedExForum; Memphis, Tennessee
NCAA Tournament
Mar 18, 2005*	(4 ABQ) No. 4	vs. (13 ABQ) Louisiana-Lafayette; First round	W 68–62	30–4	Bridgestone Arena; Nashville, Tennessee
Mar 20, 2005*	(4 ABQ) No. 4	vs. (5 ABQ) No. 25 Georgia Tech; Second Round	W 76–54	31–4	Bridgestone Arena; Nashville, Tennessee
Mar 24, 2005*	(4 ABQ) No. 4	vs. (1 ABQ) No. 8 Washington; Regional semifinal – Sweet Sixteen	W 93–79	32–4	The Pit; Albuquerque, New Mexico
Mar 26, 2005*	(4 ABQ) No. 4	vs. (7 ABQ) West Virginia; Regional Final – Elite Eight	W 93–85 ^{OT}	33–4	The Pit; Albuquerque, New Mexico
Apr 2, 2005*	(4 ABQ) No. 4	vs. (1 CHI) No. 1 Illinois; National semifinal – Final Four	L 57–72	33–5	Edward Jones Dome; St. Louis, Missouri
*Non-conference game. ^{#}Rankings from AP poll. (#) Tournament seedings in parentheses. ABQ=Albuquerque.
