= Robert Lee (basketball) =

American former basketball coach (born 1968)

Biographical details
- Born: March 12, 1968 (age 58); New Roads, Louisiana, U.S.

Playing career

Basketball
- 1986–1990: Nicholls State
- Position: Guard

Coaching career (HC unless noted)
- 1992–1996: Opelousas HS
- 1996–2004: Louisiana–Lafayette (asst.)
- 2004–2010: Louisiana–Lafayette
- 2010–2011: Louisiana–Monroe (asst.)
- 2011–2014: Arkansas–Little Rock (asst.)
- 2015–2016: Morgan City HS

Head coaching record
- Overall: 63–99 (.389) (college); 121–47 (.720) (high school)

Accomplishments and honors

Championships
- Sun Belt West Division (2008)

Robert Lawrence Lee (born March 12, 1968) is an American former basketball coach. He served as the head men's basketball coach at the University of Louisiana at Lafayette from 2004 to 2010.

== Early life and education ==
Born in New Roads, Louisiana, Lee graduated from Catholic High School of Pointe Coupee in New Roads. At Nicholls State University, Lee played under Gordon Stauffer on the Nicholls State Colonels men's basketball team from 1986 to 1990 before becoming a student assistant in the 1990–91 season. As a senior, Lee started all 27 games played and averaged 12.8 points and 2.3 rebounds. Lee completed his bachelor's degree in general studies in May 1991.

== Coaching career ==
=== Opelousas High School (1991–1996) ===
From 1992 to 1996, Lee was head coach at Opelousas High School in Opelousas, Louisiana. In five seasons, Lee had a cumulative 109–29 record.

=== Louisiana–Lafayette assistant and head coach (1996–2010) ===
From 1996 to 2004, Lee was an assistant coach at Louisiana–Lafayette under Marty Fletcher and Jessie Evans. During those years, Louisiana–Lafayette won the Sun Belt tournament in 2000 with an automatic qualification to the NCAA tournament, along with two NIT appearances and two Sun Belt West Division championships in 2002 and 2003.

On August 17, 2004, Lee was promoted to head coach. This followed the firing of Glynn Cyprien over resume issues.

In six seasons as head coach, Lee had a cumulative 80–100 record. Although Louisiana–Lafayette finished 2004–05 with a 20–11 record, Sun Belt Tournament title, and NCAA Tournament appearance, the NCAA vacated 17 wins, the conference title, and postseason appearance from that season due to the academic ineligibility of Orien Greene. Due to resulting NCAA sanctions combined with a low Academic Progress Rate score after his second season, Lee could offer only a reduced number of scholarships beginning in 2007–08. Despite these sanctions and having one of the youngest rosters in the Sun Belt, the team won the Sun Belt West Division co-championship in 2008 with a 15–15 (11–7 Sun Belt) record, which would be the best single-season winning percentage in Lee's tenure.

In his final season, Louisiana–Lafayette finished 13–17 (10–8 Sun Belt). On March 9, 2010, following a loss to Louisiana–Monroe in the first round of the Sun Belt Tournament, Louisiana–Lafayette announced that Lee's contract would not be renewed.

=== Return to assistant coaching (2010–2014) ===
After leaving Louisiana–Lafayette, Lee was an assistant at in-state Sun Belt rival Louisiana–Monroe under Keith Richard in the 2010–11 season. Again in the Sun Belt, Lee was an assistant at Arkansas–Little Rock under Steve Shields from 2011 to 2014.

=== Morgan City High School (2015–2016) ===
After a year away from basketball, in the summer of 2015, Lee became head coach at Morgan City High School in Morgan City, Louisiana. He left after one season with a 12–18 record.

== Head coaching record ==
=== College ===
Record table
Season	Team	Overall	Conference	Standing	Postseason
Louisiana–Lafayette Ragin' Cajuns (Sun Belt Conference) (2004–2010)
2004–05	Louisiana–Lafayette	3–10	0–4	6th (West)	
2005–06	Louisiana–Lafayette	13–16	7–8	T–2nd (West)	
2006–07	Louisiana–Lafayette	9–21	7–11	6th (West)	
2007–08	Louisiana–Lafayette	15–15	11–7	T–1st (West)	
2008–09	Louisiana–Lafayette	10–20	7–11	4th (West)	
2009–10	Louisiana–Lafayette	13–17	10–8	T–3rd (West)	
Louisiana–Lafayette:		63–99	42–49		
Total:		63–99			
National champion Postseason invitational champion Conference regular season champion Conference regular season and conference tournament champion Division regular season champion Division regular season and conference tournament champion Conference tournament champion
