= Denver Pioneers men's basketball =

NCAA Division I college basketball team

2026–27 Denver Pioneers men's basketball team
- University: University of Denver
- Head coach: Tim Bergstraser (2nd season)
- Location: Denver, Colorado
- Arena: Hamilton Gymnasium (capacity: 2,000)
- Conference: WCC
- Nickname: Pioneers
- Colors: Crimson and gold

NCAA Division II tournament Sweet Sixteen
- 1992

NCAA Division II tournament appearances
- 1992, 1994, 1996

Conference regular-season champions
- RMFAC: 1915 Skyline Conference: 1937 Sun Belt: 2005 WAC: 2013 (Note: Co-champions with Louisiana Tech)

The Denver Pioneers men's basketball team represents the University of Denver and competes in the NCAA Division I men's college basketball in Denver, Colorado. They are led by head coach Tim Bergstraser and are members of the Summit League. Since late in the 2019–20 seasons they have played all their home games at Hamilton Gymnasium having formerly played most of their games at the newer but larger Magness Arena.

The Pioneers are one of 35 eligible Division I programs to have never appeared in the NCAA Division I men's basketball tournament.

== History ==
Denver began intercollegiate basketball in 1904, playing their first game against the Denver Athletic Club on January 16, who they defeated. They played at the regional level prior to World War II. They played in the Rocky Mountain Faculty Athletic Conference from 1913 to 1938, when they left to become a founding member of the Skyline Conference. Vince Boryla was named a consensus All-American, the first and so far only selection in Denver history. In 1962, they became an NCAA Division I independent.

After the end of the 1978–79 season, the university's declining finances forced the program to drop down to NAIA. They went to the NCAA Division II level in 1990. From 1980 to 1985, Floyd Theard coached the team. He went 107–38 with the Pioneers, which included a home–court winning streak of 79 consecutive games. On April 12, 1985, while serving as the head basketball coach at Denver, Theard suffered a fatal heart attack at age 40. His assistant Dick Peth became the new coach and would coach until 1997, leading them to three NCAA Division II tournament bids.

Denver joined Division I for the 1998–99 season for all of its programs, including basketball. They accepted membership for the Sun Belt Conference in 1999 as a measure intended to be temporary that lasted for over a decade. The Pioneers won the regular season title with a 12–3 record in 2005. That year, they made it to the Sun Belt tournament final, which they lost 88–69 to Louisiana–Lafayette, who was later forced to vacate the win due to NCAA violations. As of 2023, it is the closest time the Pioneers have been to winning a conference tournament. Attempts to make the men's basketball team better in order to help the university's revenue stream played a part in the annual budget deficit for the university by 2010.

In November 2010, it was announced that Denver would move most of its athletic teams (such as the men's basketball team) to the Western Athletic Conference for the 2012–13 school year. In November 2012, it was announced that Denver would leave the WAC (troubled by upheaval in programs leaving) for The Summit League. In their one season in the WAC, they tied with Louisiana Tech at 16–2 for a share of the WAC regular season title. In the 2023–24 season, the Pioneers finished 7th in the Summit League, but managed to upset Kansas City and defeat Omaha to reach the Summit League tournament final, their first tournament final appearance as a program in 19 years.

=== Conference affiliations ===
- 1904–05 to 1909–10 – Independent
- 1910–11 to 1936–37 – Rocky Mountain Faculty Athletic Conference
- 1937–38 to 1961–62 – Mountain States Athletic Conference (Note: Also known as the Skyline Conference.)
- 1962–63 to 1978–79 – NCAA Division I Independent
- 1979–80 to 1989–90 – NAIA Independent
- 1990–91 to 1995–96 – Colorado Athletic Conference
- 1996–97 to 1997–98 – NCAA Division II Independent
- 1998–99 – NCAA Division I Independent
- 1999–2000 to 2011–12 – Sun Belt Conference
- 2012–13 – Western Athletic Conference
- 2013–14 to 2025–26 – Summit League
- 2026–27 to present – West Coast Conference

== Alumni ==
Notable former Denver basketball players include:

- David Adkins, played at Denver in the mid-1970s, later became known as comedian/TV actor Sinbad.
- Byron Beck, ABA and NBA player, number retired by Denver Nuggets
- Rodney Billups, Euroleague player, former Denver Men's Basketball head coach
- Vince Boryla, 1948 all-American, 1948 Gold Medal US Olympian, NBA All-Star player, coach, and executive
- Ronnie Harrell (born 1996), basketball player in the Israeli Basketball Premier League
- Ade Murkey, former forward Sacramento Kings
- Phil Heath, current Mr. Olympia bodybuilder
- Ken Michelman, played with David Adkins at DU, became a TV actor on The White Shadow, Grey's Anatomy, and other programs
- Royce O'Neale, Utah Jazz, played two years at Denver, all-WAC forward before transferring to Baylor
- Jake Pemberton (born 1996), American-Israeli basketball player in the Israeli National League

== Postseason results ==
=== NCAA Division II tournament results ===
The Pioneers have appeared in three NCAA Division II tournaments. Their combined record is 1–3.

Year	Round	Opponent	Result
1992	Regional semifinals Regional Finals	North Dakota; South Dakota State	W 73–68; L 57–87
1994	Regional Quarterfinals	North Dakota State	L 72–87
1996	Regional Quarterfinals	North Dakota State	L 70–71

=== NAIA tournament results ===
The Pioneers have appeared in two NAIA tournaments. Their combined record is 0–2.

Year	Round	Opponent	Result
1948	First round	Mankato State	L 46–49
1984	First round	Waynesburg(Pa.)	L 56–58 ^{OT}

=== NIT results ===
The Pioneers have appeared in the National Invitation Tournament (NIT) three times. Their combined record is 1–3.

Year	Round	Opponent	Result
1959	First round	NYU	L 81–90
2005	Opening Round	San Francisco	L 67–69
2013	First round Second Round	Ohio; Maryland	W 61–57; L 52–62
