= 2004–05 Temple Owls men's basketball team =

American college basketball season

2004–05 Temple Owls men's basketball

NIT, First Round
- Conference: Atlantic 10 Conference
- Record: 16–14 (11–5 A-10)
- Head coach: John Chaney (23rd season)
- Assistant coaches: Dan Leibovitz (9th season); Bill Ellerbee (3rd season); Mark Macon (3rd season)
- Home arena: Liacouras Center

2004–05 Atlantic 10 men's basketball standings
	Conf.				Overall
Team	W		L	PCT	W		L	PCT
East
Saint Joseph's	14	–	2	.875	24	–	12	.667
Temple	11	–	5	.688	16	–	14	.533
UMass	9	–	7	.563	16	–	12	.571
Fordham	8	–	8	.500	13	–	16	.448
Rhode Island	4	–	12	.250	6	–	22	.214
St. Bonaventure	1	–	15	.063	2	–	26	.071
West
George Washington †	11	–	5	.688	22	–	8	.733
Dayton	10	–	6	.625	18	–	11	.621
Xavier	10	–	6	.625	17	–	12	.586
Richmond	8	–	8	.500	14	–	15	.483
La Salle	5	–	11	.313	10	–	19	.345
Duquesne	5	–	11	.313	8	–	22	.267
† 2005 Atlantic 10 Tournament winner Rankings from AP Poll

The 2004–05 Temple Owls men's basketball team represented Temple University in the 2004–05 NCAA Division I men's basketball season. They were led by head coach John Chaney and played their home games at the Liacouras Center. The Owls are members of the Atlantic 10 Conference. They finished the season 16–14, 11–5 in A-10 play, and reached the 2005 National Invitation Tournament.

== Roster ==
#	Name	Height	Weight (lbs.)	Position	Class	Hometown		High school
1	Chris Clark	5 ft 8 in (1.73 m)	165 pounds (75 kg)	G	Fr.	Narberth, Pennsylvania	U.S.	St. Joseph's Prep
2	Wilbur Allen	6 ft 4 in (1.93 m)	200 pounds (91 kg)	G	Sr.	Mouth of Wilson, Virginia	U.S.	Oak Hill Academy
3	Dustin Salisbery	6 ft 5 in (1.96 m)	205 pounds (93 kg)	G	So.	Lancaster, Pennsylvania	U.S.	J.P. McCaskey HS
4	Dion Dacons	6 ft 6 in (1.98 m)	210 pounds (95 kg)	F	So.	Statesville, North Carolina	U.S.	Oak Hill Academy
13	Mark Tyndale	6 ft 5 in (1.96 m)	210 pounds (95 kg)	G	Fr.	Philadelphia, Pennsylvania	U.S.	Simon Gratz HS
24	Antywane Robinson	6 ft 8 in (2.03 m)	210 pounds (95 kg)	F	Jr.	Charlotte, North Carolina	U.S.	Oak Hill Academy
25	Mardy Collins	6 ft 6 in (1.98 m)	205 pounds (93 kg)	G	Jr.	Philadelphia, Pennsylvania	U.S.	Simon Gratz HS
32	DaShone Kirkendoll	6 ft 5 in (1.96 m)	210 pounds (95 kg)	G	Fr.	Dayton, Ohio	U.S.	Stebbins HS
33	Nehemiah Ingram	6 ft 8 in (2.03 m)	250 pounds (110 kg)	F	Jr.	Milledgeville, Georgia	U.S.	Baldwin HS
43	Orlando Miller	6 ft 6 in (1.98 m)	190 pounds (86 kg)	F	So.	Lanham, Maryland	U.S.	High Point HS
44	Keith Butler	7 ft 1 in (2.16 m)	255 pounds (116 kg)	C	So.	West Medford, Massachusetts	U.S.	Philadelphia Christian Academy
50	Wayne Marshall	6 ft 11 in (2.11 m)	285 pounds (129 kg)	C	So.	Philadelphia, Pennsylvania	U.S.	Martin Luther King HS
