= 2005 Mountain West Conference men's basketball tournament =

- Classification: Division I
- Season: 2004–05
- Teams: 8
- Site: Pepsi Center; Denver, Colorado
- Champions: New Mexico (1st title)
- MVP: Danny Granger (New Mexico)

2004–05 Mountain West Conference men's basketball standings
	Conf.				Overall
Team	W		L	PCT	W		L	PCT
No. 18 Utah	13	–	1	.929	29	–	6	.829
New Mexico †	10	–	4	.714	26	–	7	.788
Air Force	9	–	5	.643	18	–	12	.600
UNLV	7	–	7	.500	17	–	14	.548
Wyoming	7	–	7	.500	15	–	13	.536
San Diego State	4	–	10	.286	11	–	18	.379
BYU	3	–	11	.214	9	–	21	.300
Colorado State	3	–	11	.214	11	–	17	.393
† 2005 Mountain West tournament winner Rankings from AP Poll

The 2005 Mountain West Conference men's basketball tournament was played at Pepsi Center in Denver, Colorado, from March 9–12, 2005. Second-seeded New Mexico upset regular season league champion Utah 60–56 in the championship game to win the Mountain West Conference tournament and the league's automatic bid to the NCAA Tournament. It was the first time in the history of the tournament that the league's top two seeds advanced to the title tilt.

This marked the final conference tournament played under the league's original 8-team format. TCU joined the Mountain West in the 2005–06 athletic year. From that point on, the tournament adopted a first round play-in game, pitting the 8th and 9th place teams against each other for the right to play the regular season MWC champion in the tournament quarterfinals.

== Bracket ==
Quarterfinals; March 9
1	#15 Utah	62
8	Colorado State	49
4	UNLV	70
5	Wyoming	63
2	New Mexico	85
7	BYU	71
3	Air Force	68
6	San Diego State	73

Semifinals; March 11
1	#15 Utah	73
4	UNLV	67
2	New Mexico	77
6	San Diego State	67

Finals; March 12
1	#15 Utah	56
2	New Mexico	60
