= Ray Giacoletti =

American basketball player-coach (born 1962)

Biographical details
- Born: April 14, 1962 (age 64); Peoria, Illinois, U.S.

Playing career
- 1980–1984: Minot State

Coaching career (HC unless noted)
- 1984–1985: Minot State (GA)
- 1985–1986: Western Illinois (GA)
- 1986–1987: Oral Roberts (assistant)
- 1987–1989: Fresno Flames (assistant)
- 1989–1993: Illinois State (assistant)
- 1993–1997: Washington (assistant)
- 1997–2000: North Dakota State
- 2000–2004: Eastern Washington
- 2004–2007: Utah
- 2007–2013: Gonzaga (assistant)
- 2013–2016: Drake
- 2019–2022: Saint Louis (assistant)

Head coaching record
- Overall: 203–192 (.514)

Accomplishments and honors

Championships
- Big Sky tournament (2004); Big Sky regular season (2004); MWC regular season champion (2005)

Awards
- Big Sky Coach of the Year (2004); MWC Coach of the Year (2005)

Raymond Bryan Giacoletti (born April 14, 1962) is an American former men's basketball coach, having served as head coach at Drake University, and The University of Utah. He played collegiate basketball at Minot State University in North Dakota from 1980 to 1984, where he was a four-year letterman and a team captain for two seasons. He received his degree in physical education in 1985.

Giacoletti was previously the head coach at North Dakota State University, Eastern Washington University, and the University of Utah. At Utah, he was a finalist for the Naismith Coach of the Year Award in 2005, he was also named the 2005 Playboy National Coach of the Year. Giacoletti resigned as Drake coach on December 6, 2016.

== Coaching history ==
Born in Peoria, Illinois, Giacoletti began coaching in 1984 when he was named a student assistant coach at Minot State while finishing up his degree. Giacoletti then became a graduate assistant at Western Illinois University during the 1985–86 season. After spending a year at Western Illinois, Giacoletti became an assistant coach for Oral Roberts University during the 1986–87 season.

After 3 seasons at the collegiate level, Giacoletti moved to the professional ranks, where he spent two seasons as an assistant coach for the Fresno Flames of the old World Basketball League. Giacoletti then returned to college coaching in the 1989 season, where he was named an assistant head coach under Bob Bender at Illinois State. After three seasons with Illinois State, Bender was named the head coach of the University of Washington, where Giacoletti accepted an assistant position with the program. He was an assistant coach with the Washington Huskies from 1993 to 1997, until he accepted the head coaching job at North Dakota State.

By accepting the head coaching job at North Dakota State, Giacoletti returned to the state where he spent his collegiate years. In his first season as a head coach, Giacoletti guided North Dakota State to an 18–9 (.667) record. In his second season, North Dakota State finished with a 14–13 record and in his third season as coach, they went 16–11. Giacoletti would then leave North Dakota State for the head coaching job at Eastern Washington University. His final overall record at North Dakota State was 48–33.

In 2000 Giacoletti was named the head coach of the Eastern Washington Eagles. He would guide the Eagles to their best four year stretch in program history. Giacoletti would compile a 69–50 (.580) record as head coach at Eastern Washington, including a 41–17 (.707) record in Big Sky Conference play. In his third season as head coach of Eastern Washington, Giacoletti led the Eagles to an 18–13 record and the school's first post season tournament in school history, making the 2003 National Invitation Tournament. Giacoletti's best season was the 2003–2004 season, where the Eagles went 17–13 (11–3 in Big Sky play) and won the Big Sky Conference Championship. Giacoletti then guided the team to its first ever Big Sky tournament championship and the school's first ever NCAA tournament appearance. Eastern Washington would lose to highly favored Oklahoma State in the first round.

After successful stints with North Dakota State and Eastern Washington, Giacoletti was named the head coach of the University of Utah Utes. He replaced the legendary Rick Majerus, who retired in the middle of the 2003–2004 season. In his three seasons at Utah, Giacoletti led Utah to a 54–40 (.574) record.

In Giacoletti's first season, the Utes went 29–6 (.829) and won the Mountain West Conference regular season championship. After beating UTEP in the first round, the 6th seeded Utes upset 3rd seeded Oklahoma in the 2nd round to advance to the NCAA Sweet 16. It was the school's first Sweet 16 since the 1998 season, when Utah finished as the NCAA runner-up to Kentucky. Ironically, it was Kentucky who would beat Utah once again, ending the 2nd winningest season in school history.

During Giacoletti's tenure, Andrew Bogut was named the John R. Wooden Award winner and became the #1 draft pick in the 2005 NBA draft – joining fellow University of Utah student-athlete Alex Smith as the only time that two athletes from the same school were selected #1 in their respective drafts in the same year. Giacoletti was named the 2005 Mountain West Coach of the Year, after guiding the Utes to a 13–1 conference record, the best record in conference history.

Giacoletti's second season was dramatically different from his first. Gone was All-American Andrew Bogut, starting point guard Marc Jackson graduated, Justin Hawkins decided to transfer to New Mexico State and Richard Chaney transferred to Troy State, all major players in Utah's Sweet 16 run the season before. The Utes struggled with a young team and finished with the school's first losing record since the 1989 season, with a record of 14–15.

Giacoletti's third season saw a further decline and the Utes had their worst season since 1983–84 (11–19). His approval rating among fans plummeted and many Ute fans sought his resignation. There were even a few anti-Giacoletti web sites that popped up including Giacolettimustgo.com. A day before Utah's final regular season game, versus conference rival BYU, he resigned as Head Basketball coach effective at the end of the season.

At Drake, Giacoletti's teams got worse each season, just as at Utah (based on won-loss records). He resigned after 3+ seasons at Drake with a 32–69 record.

On March 26, 2007, Giacoletti replaced former Gonzaga assistant coach Bill Grier as an assistant coach.

Giacoletti's overall coaching record is 203–192 (.514) in 14 seasons. Giacoletti owns a 2–2 overall record in the NCAA Tournament and an 0–1 record in the National Invitation Tournament.

== Head coaching record ==
Record table
Season	Team	Overall	Conference	Standing	Postseason
North Dakota State Bison (North Central Conference) (1997–2000)
1997–98	North Dakota State	18–9	9–9	T–5th	
1998–99	North Dakota State	14–13	8–10	T–5th	
1999–00	North Dakota State	16–11	9–9	6th	
North Dakota State:		48–33 (.593)	26–28 (.481)		
Eastern Washington Eagles (Big Sky Conference) (2000–2004)
2000–01	Eastern Washington	17–11	11–5	2nd	
2001–02	Eastern Washington	17–13	10–4	2nd	
2002–03	Eastern Washington	18–13	9–5	2nd	NIT First Round
2003–04	Eastern Washington	17–13	11–3	1st	NCAA Division I Round of 64
Eastern Washington:		69–50 (.580)	41–17 (.707)		
Utah Utes (Mountain West Conference) (2005–2007)
2004–05	Utah	29–6	13–1	1st	NCAA Division I Sweet 16
2005–06	Utah	14–15	6–10	6th	
2006–07	Utah	11–19	6–10	T–6th	
Utah:		54–40 (.574)	25–21 (.543)		
Drake Bulldogs (Missouri Valley Conference) (2013–Dec. 2016)
2013–14	Drake	15–16	6–12	T–8th	
2014–15	Drake	9–22	6–12	7th	
2015–16	Drake	7–24	2–16	10th	
2016–17	Drake	1–7*	0–0*		
Drake:		32–69 (.317)	14–40 (.259)		
Total:		203–192 (.514)			
National champion Postseason invitational champion Conference regular season champion Conference regular season and conference tournament champion Division regular season champion Division regular season and conference tournament champion Conference tournament champion

*Resigned on December 6, 2016, with Jeff Rutter taking over for the rest of the 2016–17 season.
