= 2004–05 New Mexico Lobos men's basketball team =

American college basketball season

2004–05 New Mexico Lobos men's basketball

MWC tournament champions

NCAA tournament, First round
- Conference: Mountain West Conference
- Record: 26–7 (10–4 MWC)
- Head coach: Ritchie McKay (3rd season)
- Home arena: University Arena

2004–05 Mountain West Conference men's basketball standings
	Conf.				Overall
Team	W		L	PCT	W		L	PCT
No. 18 Utah	13	–	1	.929	29	–	6	.829
New Mexico †	10	–	4	.714	26	–	7	.788
Air Force	9	–	5	.643	18	–	12	.600
UNLV	7	–	7	.500	17	–	14	.548
Wyoming	7	–	7	.500	15	–	13	.536
San Diego State	4	–	10	.286	11	–	18	.379
BYU	3	–	11	.214	9	–	21	.300
Colorado State	3	–	11	.214	11	–	17	.393
† 2005 Mountain West tournament winner Rankings from AP Poll

The 2004–05 New Mexico Lobos men's basketball team represented the University of New Mexico as a member of the Mountain West Conference. The Lobos were led by head coach "Disco" Ritchie McKay and played their home games at the University Arena, also known as "The Pit", in Albuquerque, New Mexico. New Mexico finished 2nd in the Mountain West regular season standings, but defeated Utah to win the MWC tournament championship. The Lobos received an automatic bid to the NCAA tournament as No. 12 seed in the Syracuse region. The team was knocked out in the opening round by No. 5 seed Villanova, 55–47, to finish with a 26–7 record (10–4 MWC).

== Roster ==
2004–05 New Mexico Lobos men's basketball team
Players	Coaches
Pos. / # / Name / Height / Weight / Year / Previous school / Hometown; F / 33 / Danny Granger / 6 ft 9 in (2.06 m) / 215 lb (98 kg) / Sr / Bradley / New Orleans, Louisiana	Head coach: Dave Bliss; Assistant coach(es) Legend: (C) Team captain; (S) Suspended; (I) Ineligible; (W) Walk-on; Injured; Current redshirt; Roster

== Schedule and results ==
Date time, TV	Rank^{#}	Opponent^{#}	Result	Record	Site (attendance) city, state
Regular season
Nov 22, 2004*		at Oregon	L 75–79	4–1	McArthur Court; Eugene, Oregon
Dec 18, 2004*		Tennessee	W 77–58	10–1	University Arena; Albuquerque, New Mexico
Dec 22, 2004*		No. 5 Wake Forest	L 64–81	10–2	University Arena; Albuquerque, New Mexico
Feb 21, 2005		No. 13 Utah	W 65–54	20–6 (7–4)	University Arena; Albuquerque, New Mexico
Feb 26, 2005		at San Diego State	W 78–61	21–6 (8–4)	Cox Arena; San Diego, California
Feb 28, 2005		at UNLV	W 77–66	22–6 (9–4)	Thomas & Mack Center; Las Vegas, Nevada
Mar 5, 2005		Colorado State	W 72–61	23–6 (10–4)	University Arena; Albuquerque, New Mexico
MWC tournament
Mar 10, 2005*		vs. BYU; Quarterfinals	W 85–71	24–6	The Pepsi Center; Denver, Colorado
Mar 11, 2005*		vs. San Diego State; Semifinals	W 77–67	25–6	The Pepsi Center; Denver, Colorado
Mar 12, 2005*		vs. No. 15 Utah; Championship game	W 60–56	26–6	The Pepsi Center; Denver, Colorado
NCAA tournament
Mar 18, 2005*	(12 SYR)	vs. (5 SYR) No. 19 Villanova; First round	L 47–55	26–7	Bridgestone Arena; Nashville, Tennessee
*Non-conference game. ^{#}Rankings from AP poll. (#) Tournament seedings in parentheses. SYR=Syracuse.

== Team players in the 2005 NBA draft ==
Round	Pick	Player	NBA Club
1	17	Danny Granger	Indiana Pacers
