= 2004 Big Sky Conference men's basketball tournament =

- Classification: Division I
- Season: 2003–04
- Teams: 6
- Site: Reese Court; Cheney, WA
- Champions: Eastern Washington (1st title)
- Winning coach: Ray Giacoletti (1st title)
- MVP: Brendon Merritt (Eastern Washington)

2003–04 Big Sky men's basketball standings
	Conf.				Overall
Team	W		L	PCT	W		L	PCT
Eastern Washington †	11	–	3	.786	17	–	13	.567
Northern Arizona	7	–	7	.500	15	–	14	.517
Weber State	7	–	7	.500	15	–	14	.517
Sacramento State	7	–	7	.500	13	–	15	.464
Idaho State	7	–	7	.500	13	–	18	.419
Montana State	6	–	8	.429	14	–	13	.519
Montana	6	–	8	.429	10	–	18	.357
Portland State	5	–	9	.357	11	–	16	.407
† Conference tournament winner

The 2004 Big Sky Conference men's basketball tournament was held March 6–10 at Reese Court at the University of Eastern Washington in Cheney, Washington.

Top-seeded Eastern Washington defeated Northern Arizona in the championship game, 71–59, to win their first Big Sky men's basketball tournament title. EWU had lost the three previous conference championship games.

The Eagles, in turn, received an automatic bid to the 2004 NCAA tournament, their first appearance in the Division I tournament. No other Big Sky members were invited this year.

== Format ==
No new teams were added to the Big Sky prior to the 2003–04 season, leaving total membership at eight.

No changes were made to the existing tournament format. Only the top six teams from the regular season conference standings were invited to the tournament. The two top teams were given byes into the semifinals while the third- through sixth-seeded teams were placed and paired into the preliminary quarterfinal round. Following the quarterfinals, the two victorious teams were re-seeded in the semifinal round, with the lowest-seeded remaining team paired with the tournament's highest seed and vis-versa for the other.

== Bracket ==
Quarterfinals; Saturday, March 6
4	Weber State	68
5	Sacramento State	62
3	Idaho State	74
6	Montana	73

Semifinals; Tuesday, March 9
1	Eastern Washington	72
4	Weber State	53
2	Northern Arizona	91
3	Idaho State	72

Championship; Wednesday, March 10
1	Eastern Washington	71
2	Northern Arizona	59

== See also ==
- Big Sky Conference women's basketball tournament
