= 2004–05 Utah Utes men's basketball team =

American college basketball season

2004–05 Utah Utes men's basketball

Mountain West regular season champions

NCAA tournament, Sweet Sixteen
- Conference: Mountain West Conference

Ranking
- Coaches: No. 14
- AP: No. 18
- Record: 29–6 (13–1 Mountain West)
- Head coach: Ray Giacoletti (1st season)
- Assistant coach: Randy Rahe
- Home arena: Jon M. Huntsman Center

2004–05 Mountain West Conference men's basketball standings
	Conf.				Overall
Team	W		L	PCT	W		L	PCT
No. 18 Utah	13	–	1	.929	29	–	6	.829
New Mexico †	10	–	4	.714	26	–	7	.788
Air Force	9	–	5	.643	18	–	12	.600
UNLV	7	–	7	.500	17	–	14	.548
Wyoming	7	–	7	.500	15	–	13	.536
San Diego State	4	–	10	.286	11	–	18	.379
BYU	3	–	11	.214	9	–	21	.300
Colorado State	3	–	11	.214	11	–	17	.393
† 2005 Mountain West tournament winner Rankings from AP Poll

The 2004–05 Utah Utes men's basketball team represented the University of Utah in the 2004–05 season. Led by first year head coach Ray Giacoletti, due to longtime head coach Rick Majerus' resignation one year prior, the Utes made the Sweet Sixteen in the NCAA tournament. After the season, Sophomore forward Andrew Bogut was selected first overall in the NBA draft, by the Milwaukee Bucks, eventually playing with the Golden State Warriors (with whom he would win the NBA championship in 2015), the Dallas Mavericks, the Cleveland Cavaliers, and the Los Angeles Lakers. Bogut (who was born in Australia) also became the first foreign-born player to be drafted first overall from an American college.

== Roster ==
2004–05 Utah Utes men's basketball team
Players
Coaches

Pos.	#	Name	Height	Weight	Year	Hometown
C	4	Andrew Bogut	7 ft 0 in (2.13 m)	250 lb (113 kg)	So	Melbourne, Victoria
G	13	Richard Chaney	6 ft 4 in (1.93 m)	200 lb (91 kg)	Jr	Los Angeles, California

Head coach

- Ray Giacoletti (Minot State)

Assistant coach(es)

Legend

- (C) Team captain
- (S) Suspended
- (I) Ineligible
- (W) Walk-on
- Injured
- Current redshirt

== Schedule and results ==
Date time, TV	Rank^{#}	Opponent^{#}	Result	Record	Site city, state
Regular season
Nov 19, 2004*		Stony Brook	W 72–63	1–0	Jon M. Huntsman Center; Salt Lake City, Utah
Nov 25, 2004*; ESPN2		vs. No. 22 Washington; Great Alaska Shootout	L 71–78	1–1	Sullivan Arena (6,667); Anchorage, Alaska
Nov 26, 2004*		vs. High Point; Great Alaska Shootout	W 78–69	2–1	Sullivan Arena; Anchorage, Alaska
Nov 27, 2004*		vs. Furman; Great Alaska Shootout	W 62–50	3–1	Sullivan Arena; Anchorage, Alaska
Nov 30, 2004*		Southern Utah	W 65–45	4–1	Jon M. Huntsman Center; Salt Lake City, Utah
Dec 4, 2004*		at Utah State	L 45–71	4–2	Dee Glen Smith Spectrum; Logan, Utah
Dec 8, 2004*		Montana Western	W 98–63	5–2	Jon M. Huntsman Center; Salt Lake City, Utah
Dec 11, 2004*		at No. 15 Arizona	L 62–67	5–3	McKale Center; Tucson, Arizona
Dec 17, 2004*		Northern Colorado	W 81–66	6–3	Jon M. Huntsman Center; Salt Lake City
Dec 20, 2004*		Coppin State	W 66–37	7–3	Jon M. Huntsman Center; Salt Lake City
Dec 22, 2004*		at Cal Poly	W 92–76	8–3	Mott Gym; San Luis Obispo, California
Dec 28, 2004*		Weber State	W 51–40	9–3	Jon M. Huntsman Center; Salt Lake City
Dec 30, 2004*		Colorado	W 80–48	10–3	Jon M. Huntsman Center; Salt Lake City
Jan 3, 2005*		LSU	W 69–55	11–3	Jon M. Huntsman Center; Salt Lake City
Jan 5, 2005*		Whitworth	W 81–60	12–3	Jon M. Huntsman Center; Salt Lake City, Utah
Jan 10, 2005		UNLV	W 70–52	13–3 (1–0)	Jon M. Huntsman Center; Salt Lake City, Utah
Jan 15, 2005		at Wyoming	W 74–49	14–3 (2–0)	Arena-Auditorium; Laramie, Wyoming
Jan 17, 2005		at Colorado State	W 75–52	15–3 (3–0)	Moby Arena; Fort Collins, Colorado
Jan 22, 2005		New Mexico	W 69–58	16–3 (4–0)	Jon M. Huntsman Center; Salt Lake City, Utah
Jan 24, 2005	No. 25	Air Force	W 63–51	17–3 (5–0)	Jon M. Huntsman Center; Salt Lake City, Utah
Jan 31, 2005	No. 21	at BYU	W 72–58	18–3 (6–0)	Marriott Center; Provo, Utah
Feb 5, 2005	No. 21	at San Diego State	W 61–41	19–3 (7–0)	Cox Arena; San Diego, California
Feb 7, 2005	No. 15	at UNLV	W 57–53	20–3 (8–0)	Thomas & Mack Center; Las Vegas, Nevada
Feb 12, 2005	No. 15	Colorado State	W 64–50	21–3 (9–0)	Jon M. Huntsman Center; Salt Lake City, Utah
Feb 14, 2005	No. 14	Wyoming	W 71–62	22–3 (10–0)	Jon M. Huntsman Center; Salt Lake City, Utah
Feb 19, 2005	No. 14	at Air Force	W 65–56	23–3 (11–0)	Clune Arena; Colorado Springs, Colorado
Feb 21, 2005	No. 13	at New Mexico	L 54–65	23–4 (11–1)	University Arena; Albuquerque, New Mexico
Feb 26, 2005	No. 13	BYU	W 69–60	24–4 (12–1)	Jon M. Huntsman Center; Salt Lake City, Utah
Mar 5, 2005	No. 16	San Diego State	W 72–60	25–4 (13–1)	Jon M. Huntsman Center; Salt Lake City, Utah
Mountain West tournament
Mar 10, 2005*	No. 15	vs. Colorado State; Quarterfinals	W 62–49	26–4	The Pepsi Center; Denver, Colorado
Mar 11, 2005*	No. 15	vs. UNLV; Semifinals	W 73–67	27–4	The Pepsi Center; Denver, Colorado
Mar 12, 2005*	No. 15	vs. New Mexico; Championship game	L 56–60	27–5	The Pepsi Center; Denver, Colorado
NCAA tournament
Mar 17, 2005*	(6 S) No. 18	vs. (11 S) UTEP; First round	W 60–54	28–5	McKale Center; Tucson, Arizona
Mar 19, 2005*	(6 S) No. 18	vs. (3 S) No. 17 Oklahoma; Second round	W 67–58	29–5	McKale Center; Tucson, Arizona
Mar 25, 2005*	(6 S) No. 18	vs. (2 S) No. 7 Kentucky; Regional semifinal – Sweet Sixteen	L 52–62	29–6	Frank Erwin Center; Austin, Texas
*Non-conference game. ^{#}Rankings from AP Poll. (#) Tournament seedings in parentheses. S=South.

== Tournament results ==
=== Mountain West tournament ===
3/10/05 @ Pepsi Center, Denver, CO Vs. Colorado State (Quarterfinals) W, 62–49
3/11/05 @ Pepsi Center, Denver, CO Vs. UNLV (Semifinals) W, 73–67
3/12/05 @ Pepsi Center, Denver, CO Vs. New Mexico (Final) L, 56–60

=== NCAA tournament ===
3/17/05 @ McKale Center, Tucson, AZ Vs. UTEP (round of 64) W, 60–54
3/19/05 @ McKale Center, Tucson, AZ Vs. Oklahoma (round of 32) W, 67–58
3/25/05 @ Frank Erwin Center, Austin, TX Vs. Kentucky (Sweet Sixteen) L, 52–62

== Awards and honors ==
- Andrew Bogut – National Player of the Year, Consensus First-team All-American, Pete Newell Big Man Award, MWC Player of the Year

== Team players in the 2005 NBA draft ==
Round	Pick	Player	NBA club
1	1	Andrew Bogut	Milwaukee Bucks
