= 2011 NBA playoffs =

Postseason tournament

Tournament details
- Dates: April 16–June 12, 2011
- Season: 2010–11
- Teams: 16

Final positions
- Champions: Dallas Mavericks (1st title)
- Runners-up: Miami Heat
- Semifinalists: Chicago Bulls; Oklahoma City Thunder

Tournament statistics
- Scoring leader(s): Dirk Nowitzki (Mavericks) (27.7 PPG)

Awards
- MVP: Dirk Nowitzki (Mavericks)

The 2011 NBA playoffs was the postseason tournament of the National Basketball Association's 2010–11 season. The tournament concluded with the Western Conference champion Dallas Mavericks defeating the Eastern Conference champion Miami Heat 4 games to 2 in the NBA Finals. Dirk Nowitzki was named NBA Finals MVP.

The Los Angeles Lakers were the two-time defending champions, but were swept by the Mavericks in the second round.

== Overview ==
=== Western Conference ===
The San Antonio Spurs entered their fourteenth consecutive postseason. They also entered as the top seed in the Western Conference for the first time since 2006, in addition to entering the postseason with 50+ regular season wins for the twelfth consecutive season.

The two-time defending champions, the Los Angeles Lakers entered their sixth consecutive postseason. However, this would be their first since 2007 without posting the top seed in the Western Conference.

The Dallas Mavericks entered their eleventh consecutive postseason, and their eleventh straight appearance having won 50+ games in the regular season.

The Oklahoma City Thunder entered the playoffs with their first Northwest Division title under this incarnation.

The Denver Nuggets entered their eighth consecutive postseason and their first since 1995 without Carmelo Anthony on the roster.

The Portland Trail Blazers entered their third consecutive postseason.

The New Orleans Hornets also returned to the playoffs for the third time in four seasons. However, this was also their final postseason appearance before the franchise was renamed the Pelicans before the 2013–14 season. They lost in the first round to the Los Angeles Lakers in six games, and would not return to the playoffs until 2015.

The Memphis Grizzlies also made the playoffs for the first time since 2006. Unlike their previous three appearances, in which they were swept in the first round, The Grizzlies broke their trend by winning Game 1 of their series against the Spurs, their first playoff win in franchise history.

The Phoenix Suns, despite a run to the Western Conference finals last postseason, missed the playoffs for the second time in three seasons. This would also mark the start of a ten-season postseason drought for the Suns.

The Utah Jazz missed the playoffs for the first time since 2006.

=== Eastern Conference ===
The Chicago Bulls achieved several "firsts" since 1998: the East's best record, a Central Division title, and over 60 victories. They also clinched the NBA's best record for the first time since 1997, guaranteeing home-court advantage throughout the playoffs.

The Miami Heat entered their third consecutive postseason, and their first in the Big 3 era of Dwyane Wade, LeBron James, and Chris Bosh. They would also open the playoffs at home for the first time since 2006. Their in–state rivals, the Orlando Magic, entered their fifth consecutive postseason. In addition, for the first time, both franchises would open their playoff runs at home.

The New York Knicks made the playoffs for the first time since 2004, but this was their first playoff appearance as an above-.500 team since 2001. However, they were swept by the Boston Celtics in the first round.

The Philadelphia 76ers appeared for the third time in four seasons. However, they lost in the first round to the Miami Heat.

The Indiana Pacers made the playoffs for the first time since 2006, despite posting a sub .500 record. However, they lost to the Chicago Bulls in the first round.

=== First Round ===
By losing Game 1 of their series against the New Orleans Hornets, the Los Angeles Lakers joined the San Antonio Spurs as the first top seeds to lose an opening game of the playoffs since the 16–team playoff format was introduced.

In Game 1 of the first round series between the Orlando Magic and Atlanta Hawks Dwight Howard of the Orlando Magic tied a franchise record with 46 points (31 in the first half), tying Tracy McGrady's total in Game 2 of the 2003 First Round against the Detroit Pistons. This also marked the first home playoff game with new Amway Center (now called Kia Center)

In Game 4 of their first round series against the Dallas Mavericks, the Portland Trail Blazers overcame a 23-point deficit to tie the series at 2. However, the Mavericks would go on to win the series in six games, giving the Trail Blazers their sixth consecutive first round series loss. They would not return to the playoffs until 2014.

With their first round win over the Denver Nuggets, the Oklahoma City Thunder won their first playoff series since relocating from Seattle. This also marked the first playoff series win for Kevin Durant.

With their first round sweep of the New York Knicks, the Boston Celtics swept a best–of–7 playoff series for the first time since winning the 1986 Eastern Conference finals with a 4–game sweep of the Bucks; prior to the series win they had not swept a series overall since 1992, in Larry Bird's final season. However, they lost to the Miami Heat in the conference semifinals.

With their first round series victory over the Philadelphia 76ers, the Miami Heat won their first playoff series since 2006, when they last won the NBA Championship. It also marked the first playoff series win for Erik Spoelstra as a head coach.

With their first round series win over the Indians Pacers, the Chicago Bulls won their first playoff series since 2007.

In Game 6 of their first round series against the San Antonio Spurs, the Memphis Grizzlies followed up their first playoff win by winning their first playoff series. They became the fourth eighth seeded team to beat a top seeded team in the first round, and the second team to do so since the first round expanded to a best–of–seven format in 2003. The Golden State Warriors were the most recent team to accomplish this feat.

With their series loss to the Atlanta Hawks, the Orlando Magic became the first team coached by Stan Van Gundy to lose a first round playoff series.

For the first time since the current NBA Playoff format was introduced in 2003, no first-round series was pushed to a Game 7.

=== Conference semifinals ===
The Los Angeles Lakers and the Dallas Mavericks met in the playoffs for the first time since 1988. It also marked the lone postseason meeting that Kobe Bryant and Dirk Nowitzki would ever have. The series was extremely notable for the following reasons.

- Game 1: The Dallas Mavericks overcame a 16-point fourth quarter deficit to win the game.
- Game 2: The Los Angeles Lakers lost the first two games of a playoff series at home.
- Game 3: The Los Angeles Lakers blew a 7-point fourth quarter lead to lose 92–98.
- Game 4
  - The Dallas Mavericks set an NBA record with 20 three pointers (with Jason Terry shooting nine of them).
  - Andrew Bynum and Lamar Odom getting ejected 45 seconds apart
  - With a 122–86 victory, the Dallas Mavericks not only swept the Los Angeles Lakers, but they also made the conference finals for the first time since 2006 (and fourth overall), and vindicated themselves following their shocking first round exit four years earlier.
  - This would also prove to be Phil Jackson's final game as an NBA head coach.
- Their series loss to the Dallas Mavericks marked the Los Angeles Lakers' first series loss despite having home court advantage since 1996. It also marked Phil Jackson's first time being swept in a playoff series.

Game 4 of the Heat–Celtics series was Shaquille O'Neal's final NBA game; he would announce his retirement three weeks later. It also marked the second time (the first being 2007) that his and Kobe Bryant's teams were eliminated in the same playoff series since the duo broke up in 2004.

With their conference semifinals win over the Atlanta Hawks, the Chicago Bulls returned to the conference finals for the first time since 1998, when they last made the NBA Finals.

Game 7 of the Grizzlies–Thunder series also ensured a 12th straight postseason with at least one Game 7 played. The last without one was the 1999 NBA playoffs. The 2011 Playoffs also marked the first time since 2007 that only one series went to a Game 7. By winning this game, the Oklahoma City Thunder made their first Western Conference finals appearance since 1996 (when they were known as the Seattle SuperSonics), and their first under the current incarnation.

=== Conference finals ===
For the first time since 2007, no #1 or #2 seed participated in the Western Conference finals.

With their Western Conference finals series win over the Oklahoma City Thunder, the Dallas Mavericks returned to the NBA Finals for the first time since 2006.

With their Eastern Conference finals series win over the Chicago Bulls, the Miami Heat returned to the NBA Finals for the first time since 2006, guaranteeing an NBA Finals rematch with the Dallas Mavericks. It also marked the first time since 1990 that the Chicago Bulls lost an Eastern Conference finals series, and the first time since 1989 that the Bulls lost the ECF at home. As of 2024, this was the Bulls' most recent Eastern Conference finals appearance.

=== NBA Finals ===
In a rematch of the 2006 NBA Finals, there were some extremely notable moments.

- Game 2: The Dallas Mavericks came back from a fifteen-point deficit to win the game, 95–93. Ironically enough, they held a nine-point lead in the first half before falling behind in the second half. LeBron James only scored two points in the final quarter.
- Game 4: LeBron James did not score any points in the fourth quarter as the Dallas Mavericks won, 86–83. Dirk Nowitzki, on the other hand, played despite having a fever.
- Game 5: LeBron James scored only two points in the fourth quarter for the third time in four games, allowing the Dallas Mavericks to take a 3–2 series lead back to Miami.
- Game 6: With the win, the Dallas Mavericks defeated the Miami Heat in six games to win the championship. The Dallas Mavericks also became the first team in NBA History to win the NBA Finals despite trailing 1–0 and 2–1 in the same finals series. Dirk Nowitzki, despite shooting 1 for 12 in the first half of the game, was Finals MVP. The Mavericks would not win another playoff series until 2022.

== Format ==
The 3 division winners and 5 other teams with the most wins from each conference qualified for the playoffs. The seedings are based on each team's record. However, a division champion is guaranteed to be ranked at least fourth, regardless of their record and their winnings.

=== Tiebreak procedures ===
The tiebreakers that determined seedings were:

1. Division leader wins tie against team not leading a division
2. Head-to-head record
3. Division record (if all tied teams are in the same division)
4. Conference record
5. Record vs. playoff teams, own conference (top 8 of the conference east/west) (including tied teams)
6. Record vs. playoff teams, other conference (top 8 of the conference east/west) (including tied teams) (this tiebreaker does not apply if 3 or more tied teams)
7. Point differential, all games

== Playoff qualifying ==
=== Eastern Conference ===
Seed	Team	Record	Clinched			
Seed	Team	Record	Playoff berth	Division title	Best record in Conference	Best record in NBA
1	Chicago Bulls	62–20	March 9	March 9	April 8	April 13
2	Miami Heat	58–24	March 10	April 3	—	—
3	Boston Celtics	56–26	March 7	March 20	—	—
4	Orlando Magic	52–30	March 16	—	—	—
5	Atlanta Hawks	44–38	March 26	—	—	—
6	New York Knicks	42–40	April 3	—	—	—
7	Philadelphia 76ers	41–41	April 1	—	—	—
8	Indiana Pacers	37–45	April 6	—	—	—

=== Western Conference ===
Seed	Team	Record	Clinched		
Seed	Team	Record	Playoff berth	Division title	Best record in Conference
1	San Antonio Spurs	61–21	March 9	April 3	April 6
2	Los Angeles Lakers	57–25 (Note: Los Angeles Lakers clinched #2 seed over Dallas Mavericks based on winning Pacific Division.)	March 20	March 20	—
3	Dallas Mavericks	57–25	March 20	—	—
4	Oklahoma City Thunder	55–27	March 27	April 6	—
5	Denver Nuggets	50–32	April 3	—	—
6	Portland Trail Blazers	48–34	April 5	—	—
7	New Orleans Hornets	46–36 (Note: New Orleans Hornets clinched #7 seed over Memphis Grizzlies based on Southwest Division winning percentage. (.563 vs .500))	April 6	—	—
8	Memphis Grizzlies	46–36	April 8	—	—

— = Did not achieve

== Bracket ==
Teams in bold advanced to the next round. The numbers to the left of each team indicate the team's seeding in its conference, and the numbers to the right indicate the number of games the team won in that round. The division champions are marked by an asterisk. Home court advantage for the playoffs does not necessarily belong to the higher-seeded team, but instead the team with the better regular season record; teams with home court advantage are shown in italics. If two teams with same record met in a round use normal tiebreakers. Tiebreakers in NBA Finals are head-to-head and record vs opposite conference.

First Round	Conference semifinals
**E1**	**Chicago***	**4**
E8	Indiana	1
**E1**	**Chicago***	**4**
E5	Atlanta	2
E4	Orlando	2
**E5**	**Atlanta**	**4**
**Eastern Conference**
**E3**	**Boston***	**4**
E6	New York	0
E3	Boston*	1
**E2**	**Miami***	**4**
**E2**	**Miami***	**4**
E7	Philadelphia	1
W1	San Antonio*	2
**W8**	**Memphis**	**4**
W8	Memphis	3
**W4**	**Oklahoma City***	**4**
**W4**	**Oklahoma City***	**4**
W5	Denver	1
**Western Conference**
**W3**	**Dallas**	**4**
W6	Portland	2
**W3**	**Dallas**	**4**
W2	LA Lakers*	0
**W2**	**LA Lakers***	**4**
W7	New Orleans	2

Conference finals
E1	Chicago*	1
**E2**	**Miami***	**4**
W4	Oklahoma City*	1
**W3**	**Dallas**	**4**

NBA Finals
E2	Miami*	2
**W3**	**Dallas**	**4**

- * Division winner
- **Bold** Series winner
- Italic Team with home-court advantage

== First round ==
All times are in Eastern Daylight Time (UTC−4)

=== Eastern Conference first round ===
==== (1) Chicago Bulls vs. (8) Indiana Pacers ====
ESPN

April 16
1:00 pm

Recap

Indiana Pacers 99, Chicago Bulls 104
Scoring by quarter: 27–23, 28–28, 24–20, 20–33
Pts: Danny Granger 24; Rebs: Roy Hibbert 8 Asts: Darren Collison 9	Pts: Derrick Rose 39; Rebs: Joakim Noah 11; Asts: Derrick Rose 6
Chicago leads series, 1–0

United Center, Chicago
Attendance: 22,986
Referees: Joe Crawford, Violet Palmer, Bennett Salvatore

TNT

April 18
9:30 pm

Recap

Indiana Pacers 90, Chicago Bulls 96
Scoring by quarter: 18–17, 29–27, 20–23, 23–29
Pts: Danny Granger 19; Rebs: Hansbrough, McRoberts 6 each Asts: Dunleavy, Granger 4 each	Pts: Derrick Rose 36; Rebs: Carlos Boozer 16; Asts: Derrick Rose 6
Chicago leads series, 2–0

United Center, Chicago
Attendance: 22,480
Referees: Bob Delaney, Marc Davis, Rodney Mott

NBA TV

April 21
7:00 pm

Recap

Chicago Bulls 88, Indiana Pacers 84
Scoring by quarter: 21–17, 21–25, 23–22, 23–20
Pts: Derrick Rose 23; Rebs: Carlos Boozer 11; Asts: Luol Deng 6	Pts: Danny Granger 21; Rebs: Paul George 12; Asts: Collison, Dunleavy, George, Granger 2 each
Chicago leads series, 3–0

Conseco Fieldhouse, Indianapolis
Attendance: 18,165
Referees: Mike Callahan, John Goble, Ken Mauer

TNT

April 23
2:30 pm

Recap

Chicago Bulls 84, Indiana Pacers 89
Scoring by quarter: 19–23, 14–26, 23–18, 28–22
Pts: Joakim Noah 21; Rebs: Joakim Noah 14; Asts: Derrick Rose 10	Pts: Danny Granger 24; Rebs: Granger, Hibbert 10 each Asts: Danny Granger 4
Chicago leads series, 3–1

Conseco Fieldhouse, Indianapolis
Attendance: 18,165
Referees: Scott Foster, David Jones, Michael Smith

TNT

April 26
8:00 pm

Recap

Indiana Pacers 89, Chicago Bulls 116
Scoring by quarter: 25–36, 21–18, 19–30, 24–32
Pts: Danny Granger 20; Rebs: Tyler Hansbrough 11; Asts: Darren Collison 5	Pts: Derrick Rose 25; Rebs: Joakim Noah 8 Asts: Deng, Watson 7 each
Chicago wins series, 4–1

United Center, Chicago
Attendance: 22,822
Referees: Dan Crawford, Zach Zarba, Bill Kennedy

Regular-season series

Chicago won 3–1 in the regular-season series

December 13, 2010

Recap

Indiana Pacers 73, Chicago Bulls 92

United Center, Chicago, Illinois

January 14, 2011

Recap

Chicago Bulls 99, Indiana Pacers 86

Conseco Fieldhouse, Indianapolis

January 29, 2011

Recap

Indiana Pacers 89, Chicago Bulls 110

United Center, Chicago, Illinois

March 18, 2011

Recap

Chicago Bulls 108, Indiana Pacers 115

Conseco Fieldhouse, Indianapolis

This was the second playoff meeting between these two teams, with the Bulls winning the first meeting.

Previous playoff series
Chicago leads 1–0 in all-time playoff series

1998

Chicago Bulls 4, Indiana Pacers 3

1998 Eastern Conference finals

This series pitted the team with the best record in the regular season against the team with the worst record in the playoffs. As such, this series was expected to be a very easy one for the Bulls. However, despite the Bulls winning 4–1, the series was more competitive than the outcome would indicate. Every game but the last was tightly contested; the first four games were each decided by six points or fewer. The series could easily have gone six or seven games had the Pacers been more successful in the closing moments of each of the first three games. However, the Bulls advanced to the Eastern Conference semifinals for just the second time since the Michael Jordan era (the first being 2007).

==== (2) Miami Heat vs. (7) Philadelphia 76ers ====
ABC

April 16
3:30 pm

Recap

Philadelphia 76ers 89, Miami Heat 97
Scoring by quarter: 31–19, 18–35, 20–26, 20–17
Pts: Thaddeus Young 20; Rebs: Thaddeus Young 11; Asts: Andre Iguodala 9	Pts: Chris Bosh 25; Rebs: LeBron James 14; Asts: James, Wade 5 each
Miami leads series, 1–0

American Airlines Arena, Miami
Attendance: 19,600
Referees: Bob Delaney, Bill Spooner, Sean Wright

TNT

April 18
7:00 pm

Recap

Philadelphia 76ers 73, Miami Heat 94
Scoring by quarter: 13–19, 18–30, 21–26, 21–19
Pts: Thaddeus Young 18; Rebs: Brand, Iguodala 7 each Asts: Andre Iguodala 7	Pts: LeBron James 29; Rebs: Chris Bosh 11; Asts: LeBron James 6
Miami leads series, 2–0

American Airlines Arena, Miami
Attendance: 20,204
Referees: Scott Foster, Tony Brown, Ron Garretson

TNT

April 21
8:00 pm

Recap

Miami Heat 100, Philadelphia 76ers 94
Scoring by quarter: 21–29, 29–23, 23–23, 27–19
Pts: Dwyane Wade 32; Rebs: LeBron James 15; Asts: Dwyane Wade 8	Pts: Elton Brand 21; Rebs: Elton Brand 10; Asts: Andre Iguodala 10
Miami leads series, 3–0

Wells Fargo Center, Philadelphia
Attendance: 20,404
Referees: Greg Willard, David Jones, Zach Zarba

ABC

April 24
1:00 pm

Recap

Miami Heat 82, Philadelphia 76ers 86
Scoring by quarter: 16–28, 31–18, 19–18, 16–22
Pts: LeBron James 31; Rebs: Dwyane Wade 8 Asts: LeBron James 6	Pts: Turner, Williams 17 each Rebs: Elton Brand 11; Asts: Jrue Holiday 5
Miami leads series, 3–1

Wells Fargo Center, Philadelphia
Attendance: 19,048
Referees: Joe Crawford, David Guthrie, Dick Bavetta

TNT

April 27
7:00 pm

Recap

Philadelphia 76ers 91, Miami Heat 97
Scoring by quarter: 23–27, 19–18, 25–27, 24–25
Pts: Brand, Iguodala 22 each Rebs: Iguodala, Turner 10 each Asts: Jrue Holiday 8	Pts: Dwyane Wade 26; Rebs: Bosh, Wade 11 each Asts: LeBron James 8
Miami wins series, 4–1

American Airlines Arena, Miami
Attendance: 19,896
Referees: Steve Javie, Tony Brothers, Bennett Salvatore

Regular-season series

Miami won 3–0 in the regular-season series

October 27, 2010

Recap

Miami Heat 97, Philadelphia 76ers 87

Wells Fargo Center, Philadelphia

November 26, 2010

Recap

Philadelphia 76ers 90, Miami Heat 99

American Airlines Arena, Miami

March 25, 2011

Recap

Philadelphia 76ers 99, Miami Heat 111

American Airlines Arena, Miami

This was the first playoff meeting between the 76ers and the Heat.

The newly revamped Heat, with the much-publicized off-season acquisitions of All-Stars and franchise players LeBron James and Chris Bosh, were heavy favorites going into this series against the Philadelphia 76ers. Along with Dwyane Wade, James and Bosh comprised the "Big 3" and were eager to show critics that they could compete in the playoffs after some slip-ups during the regular season (a 9–8 start, a five-game losing streak and a somewhat suspect record against the best teams in the league). However, many pundits believed that the end of the season showed the Heat playing the best they had all season. Although the Sixers offered some resistance, including some close losses and a come-from-behind victory in Game 4, the Heat were able to take it in five games and advance out of the first round for the first time since their NBA Championship in 2006.

==== (3) Boston Celtics vs. (6) New York Knicks ====
TNT

April 17
7:00 pm

Recap

New York Knicks 85, Boston Celtics 87
Scoring by quarter: 23–24, 28–15, 13–20, 21–28
Pts: Amar'e Stoudemire 28; Rebs: Amar'e Stoudemire 11; Asts: Anthony, Billups 4 each	Pts: Ray Allen 24; Rebs: Kevin Garnett 13; Asts: Rajon Rondo 9
Boston leads series, 1–0

TD Garden, Boston
Attendance: 18,624
Referees: Jason Phillips, Tom Washington, Monty McCutchen

TNT

April 19
7:00 pm

Recap

New York Knicks 93, Boston Celtics 96
Scoring by quarter: 21–23, 24–21, 22–30, 26–22
Pts: Carmelo Anthony 42; Rebs: Carmelo Anthony 17; Asts: Carmelo Anthony 6	Pts: Rajon Rondo 30; Rebs: Kevin Garnett 10; Asts: Rajon Rondo 7
Boston leads series, 2–0

TD Garden, Boston
Attendance: 18,624
Referees: Joe Crawford, Bennett Salvatore, Michael Smith

ESPN

April 22
7:00 pm

Recap

Boston Celtics 113, New York Knicks 96
Scoring by quarter: 27–20, 25–24, 34–19, 27–33
Pts: Paul Pierce 38; Rebs: Kevin Garnett 12; Asts: Rajon Rondo 20	Pts: Shawne Williams 17; Rebs: Carmelo Anthony 11; Asts: Carmelo Anthony 6
Boston leads series, 3–0

Madison Square Garden, New York City
Attendance: 19,763
Referees: Dan Crawford, Marc Davis, Gary Zielinski

ABC

April 24
3:30 pm

Recap

Boston Celtics 101, New York Knicks 89
Scoring by quarter: 29–23, 26–15, 27–34, 19–17
Pts: Kevin Garnett 26; Rebs: Kevin Garnett 10; Asts: Rajon Rondo 12	Pts: Carmelo Anthony 32; Rebs: Amar'e Stoudemire 12; Asts: Anthony Carter 4
Boston wins series, 4–0

Madison Square Garden, New York City
Attendance: 19,763
Referees: Mike Callahan, Derrick Collins, Ken Mauer

Regular-season series

Boston won 4–0 in the regular-season series

October 29, 2010

Recap

New York Knicks 101, Boston Celtics 105

TD Garden, Boston

December 15, 2010

Recap

Boston Celtics 118, New York Knicks 116

Madison Square Garden, New York City

March 21, 2011

Recap

Boston Celtics 96, New York Knicks 86

Madison Square Garden, New York City

April 13, 2011

Recap

New York Knicks 102, Boston Celtics 112

TD Garden, Boston

This was the 14th playoff meeting between these two teams, with the Celtics winning seven of the first 13 meetings.

Previous playoff series
Boston leads 7–6 in all-time playoff series

1951

Boston Celtics 0, New York Knicks 2

1951 Eastern Division semifinals

1952

Boston Celtics 1, New York Knicks 2

1952 Eastern Division semifinals

1953

Boston Celtics 1, New York Knicks 3

1953 Eastern Division finals

1954

Boston Celtics 2, New York Knicks 0

1954 Eastern Division Round Robin Semifinals

1955

Boston Celtics 2, New York Knicks 1

1955 Eastern Division semifinals

1967

Boston Celtics 3, New York Knicks 1

1967 Eastern Division semifinals

1969

Boston Celtics 4, New York Knicks 2

1969 Eastern Division finals

1972

Boston Celtics 1, New York Knicks 4

1972 Eastern Conference finals

1973

Boston Celtics 3, New York Knicks 4

1973 Eastern Conference finals

1974

Boston Celtics 4, New York Knicks 1

1974 Eastern Conference finals

1984

Boston Celtics 4, New York Knicks 3

1984 Eastern Conference semifinals

1988

Boston Celtics 3, New York Knicks 1

1988 Eastern Conference First Round

1990

Boston Celtics 2, New York Knicks 3

1990 Eastern Conference First Round

Due to the Celtics' struggles at the end of the regular season and the star power of the Knicks' Amar'e Stoudemire and Carmelo Anthony, many observers predicted a first-round upset victory for New York. In the first two games, the Knicks were indeed able to show they could contend with the defending Eastern Conference champions. In Game 1, Ray Allen made a game-winning three-pointer after being freed up by a controversial screen. The Celtics captured Games 3 and 4 fairly easily as injuries to both Stoudemire and Chauncey Billups took their toll on the Knicks. This was the only sweep of the first round.

==== (4) Orlando Magic vs. (5) Atlanta Hawks ====
ESPN

April 16
7:00 pm

Recap

Atlanta Hawks 103, Orlando Magic 93
Scoring by quarter: 17–19, 38–29, 30–23, 18–22
Pts: Joe Johnson 25; Rebs: Josh Smith 8 Asts: Crawford, Johnson 5 each	Pts: Dwight Howard 46; Rebs: Dwight Howard 19; Asts: Hedo Türkoğlu 5
Atlanta leads series, 1–0

Amway Center, Orlando, Florida
Attendance: 19,108
Referees: Scott Foster, Derrick Collins, Ron Garretson

NBA TV

April 19
7:30 pm

Recap

Atlanta Hawks 82, Orlando Magic 88
Scoring by quarter: 22–16, 20–32, 12–17, 28–23
Pts: Jamal Crawford 25; Rebs: Al Horford 10; Asts: Joe Johnson 5	Pts: Dwight Howard 33; Rebs: Dwight Howard 19; Asts: Hedo Türkoğlu 5
Series tied, 1–1

Amway Center, Orlando, Florida
Attendance: 19,160
Referees: Mike Callahan, David Guthrie, Bill Spooner

ESPN2

April 22
8:00 pm

Recap

Orlando Magic 84, Atlanta Hawks 88
Scoring by quarter: 25–25, 17–26, 20–15, 22–22
Pts: Dwight Howard 21; Rebs: Dwight Howard 15; Asts: Jameer Nelson 10	Pts: Jamal Crawford 23; Rebs: Josh Smith 10; Asts: Joe Johnson 5
Atlanta leads series, 2–1

Philips Arena, Atlanta
Attendance: 19,865
Referees: Monty McCutchen, Dick Bavetta, Leon Wood

TNT

April 24
7:00 pm

Recap

Orlando Magic 85, Atlanta Hawks 88
Scoring by quarter: 17–25, 20–21, 24–20, 24–22
Pts: Dwight Howard 29; Rebs: Dwight Howard 17; Asts: Jameer Nelson 6	Pts: Jamal Crawford 25; Rebs: Al Horford 12; Asts: Jamal Crawford 6
Atlanta leads series, 3–1

Philips Arena, Atlanta
Attendance: 19,490
Referees: Dan Crawford, Ed Malloy, Pat Fraher

NBA TV

April 26
7:30 pm

Recap

Atlanta Hawks 76, Orlando Magic 101
Scoring by quarter: 13–26, 22–32, 18–21, 23–22
Pts: Josh Smith 22; Rebs: Al Horford 14; Asts: Al Horford 6	Pts: Jason Richardson 17; Rebs: Dwight Howard 8 Asts: Jameer Nelson 5
Atlanta leads series, 3–2

Amway Center, Orlando, Florida
Attendance: 19,091
Referees: Joe Crawford, Marc Davis, Jason Phillips

NBA TV

April 28
7:30 pm

Recap

Orlando Magic 81, Atlanta Hawks 84
Scoring by quarter: 18–23, 18–19, 19–20, 26–22
Pts: Dwight Howard 25; Rebs: Dwight Howard 15; Asts: Jameer Nelson 6	Pts: Joe Johnson 23; Rebs: Al Horford 12; Asts: Al Horford 6
Atlanta wins series, 4–2

Philips Arena, Atlanta
Attendance: 19,282
Referees: Derrick Stafford, Michael Smith, Bill Kennedy

Regular-season series

Atlanta won 3–1 in the regular-season series

November 8, 2010

Recap

Atlanta Hawks 89, Orlando Magic 93

Amway Center, Orlando, Florida

December 6, 2010

Recap

Atlanta Hawks 80, Orlando Magic 74

Amway Center, Orlando, Florida

December 20, 2010

Recap

Orlando Magic 81, Atlanta Hawks 91

Philips Arena, Atlanta

March 30, 2011

Recap

Orlando Magic 82, Atlanta Hawks 85

Philips Arena, Atlanta

This was the third playoff meeting between these two teams, with the Magic winning the first two meetings.

Previous playoff series
Orlando leads 2–0 in all-time playoff series

1996

Atlanta Hawks 1, Orlando Magic 4

1996 Eastern Conference semifinals

2010

Atlanta Hawks 0, Orlando Magic 4

2010 Eastern Conference semifinals

Despite defeating Orlando in three of their four regular-season meetings, the Atlanta Hawks were considered underdogs entering this series against the Magic, led by Defensive Player of the Year Dwight Howard. The Hawks were utterly unable to contain Howard in the first game; he scored 46 points and grabbed 19 rebounds. However, by limiting the contributions of the Magic's role players, Atlanta garnered a victory and stole the home-court advantage from the Magic. Although Orlando won the next game, better play by the Hawks down the stretch and the inability of the Magic to convert three-point shots gave the Hawks a 3–1 lead (the Magic shot 2-of–23 from beyond the arc in Game 4). The teams split the next two games and the Hawks advanced to the Eastern Conference semifinals for the third straight year.

=== Western Conference first round ===
==== (1) San Antonio Spurs vs. (8) Memphis Grizzlies ====
TNT

April 17
1:00 pm

Recap

Memphis Grizzlies 101, San Antonio Spurs 98
Scoring by quarter: 27–22, 18–21, 25–31, 31–24
Pts: Zach Randolph 25; Rebs: Zach Randolph 14; Asts: Mike Conley Jr. 10	Pts: Tony Parker 20; Rebs: Tim Duncan 13; Asts: Tony Parker 5
Memphis leads series, 1–0

AT&T Center, San Antonio
Attendance: 18,581
Referees: Derrick Stafford, Ed Malloy, Pat Fraher

NBA TV

April 20
8:30 pm

Recap

Memphis Grizzlies 87, San Antonio Spurs 93
Scoring by quarter: 17–17, 27–24, 21–25, 22–27
Pts: Sam Young 17; Rebs: Marc Gasol 17; Asts: Conley, Mayo 4 each	Pts: Manu Ginóbili 17; Rebs: Tim Duncan 10; Asts: Tony Parker 7
Series tied, 1–1

AT&T Center, San Antonio
Attendance: 18,760
Referees: Scott Foster, Ron Garretson, Leon Wood

ESPN

April 23
7:30 pm

Recap

San Antonio Spurs 88, Memphis Grizzlies 91
Scoring by quarter: 20–29, 22–23, 24–19, 22–20
Pts: Manu Ginóbili 23; Rebs: Tim Duncan 11; Asts: Tim Duncan 6	Pts: Zach Randolph 25; Rebs: Marc Gasol 9 Asts: Mike Conley Jr. 8
Memphis leads series, 2–1

FedExForum, Memphis, Tennessee
Attendance: 18,119
Referees: Greg Willard, Tom Washington, John Goble

TNT

April 25
8:00 pm

Recap

San Antonio Spurs 86, Memphis Grizzlies 104
Scoring by quarter: 26–21, 24–27, 15–30, 21–26
Pts: Tony Parker 23; Rebs: Tiago Splitter 9 Asts: Manu Ginóbili 4	Pts: Mike Conley Jr. 15; Rebs: Gasol, Randolph 9 each Asts: Mike Conley Jr. 7
Memphis leads series, 3–1

FedExForum, Memphis, Tennessee
Attendance: 18,119
Referees: Monty McCutchen, Bill Spooner, Eric Lewis

NBA TV

April 27
8:30 pm

Recap

Memphis Grizzlies 103, San Antonio Spurs 110 (OT)
Scoring by quarter: 14–20, 28–30, 26–15, 29–32, Overtime: 6–13
Pts: Zach Randolph 26; Rebs: Marc Gasol 17; Asts: Zach Randolph 6	Pts: Manu Ginóbili 33; Rebs: Tim Duncan 12; Asts: Tony Parker 9
Memphis leads series, 3–2

AT&T Center, San Antonio
Attendance: 18,581
Referees: Bob Delaney, David Jones, Ken Mauer

ESPN

April 29
9:00 pm

Recap

San Antonio Spurs 91, Memphis Grizzlies 99
Scoring by quarter: 16–24, 27–22, 23–24, 25–29
Pts: Tony Parker 23; Rebs: Tim Duncan 10; Asts: Tony Parker 4	Pts: Zach Randolph 31; Rebs: Marc Gasol 13; Asts: Mike Conley Jr. 3
Memphis wins series, 4–2

FedExForum, Memphis, Tennessee
Attendance: 18,119
Referees: Dan Crawford, Jason Phillips, Bennett Salvatore

Regular-season series

Tied 2–2 in the regular-season series

December 18, 2010

Recap

Memphis Grizzlies 106, San Antonio Spurs 112

AT&T Center, San Antonio

February 27, 2011

Recap

Memphis Grizzlies 88, San Antonio Spurs 95

AT&T Center, San Antonio

March 1, 2011

Recap

San Antonio Spurs 93, Memphis Grizzlies 109

FedExForum, Memphis, Tennessee

March 27, 2011

Recap

San Antonio Spurs 104, Memphis Grizzlies 111

FedExForum, Memphis, Tennessee

This was the second playoff meeting between these two teams, with the Spurs winning the first meeting.

Previous playoff series
San Antonio leads 1–0 in all-time playoff series

2004

Memphis Grizzlies 0, San Antonio Spurs 4

2004 Western Conference First Round

The eighth-seeded Grizzlies won their first playoff game in franchise history by defeating the top-seeded Spurs 101–98 in Game 1. The Spurs evened the series in Game 2, but the Grizzlies won Games 3 and 4 to take a 3–1 lead. With San Antonio 1.7 seconds away from elimination in Game 5, Gary Neal connected on a three-point buzzer beater to force overtime. The Spurs would win in OT, 110–103. However, the Grizzlies defeated the Spurs in Game 6, 99–91, to win a playoff series for the first time. In so doing, Memphis became just the second eighth-seeded team to knock off a top-seeded team since the NBA began using a best-of-seven format in the first round.

==== (2) Los Angeles Lakers vs. (7) New Orleans Hornets ====
ABC

April 17
3:30 pm

Recap

New Orleans Hornets 109, Los Angeles Lakers 100
Scoring by quarter: 26–24, 29–23, 18–25, 36–28
Pts: Chris Paul 33; Rebs: Ariza, Paul 7 each Asts: Chris Paul 14	Pts: Kobe Bryant 34; Rebs: Ron Artest 11; Asts: Pau Gasol 6
New Orleans leads series, 1–0

Staples Center, Los Angeles
Attendance: 18,997
Referees: Dan Crawford, Greg Willard, Greg Zielinski

TNT

April 20
10:30 pm

Recap

New Orleans Hornets 78, Los Angeles Lakers 87
Scoring by quarter: 23–23, 18–24, 15–16, 22–24
Pts: Trevor Ariza 22; Rebs: Aaron Gray 8 Asts: Chris Paul 9	Pts: Andrew Bynum 17; Rebs: Andrew Bynum 11; Asts: Steve Blake 5
Series tied, 1–1

Staples Center, Los Angeles
Attendance: 18,997
Referees: Steve Javie, Tony Brothers, Bill Kennedy

ESPN

April 22
9:30 pm

Recap

Los Angeles Lakers 100, New Orleans Hornets 86
Scoring by quarter: 30–23, 21–19, 24–26, 25–18
Pts: Kobe Bryant 30; Rebs: Andrew Bynum 11; Asts: Derek Fisher 5	Pts: Carl Landry 23; Rebs: Trevor Ariza 12; Asts: Chris Paul 8
LA Lakers lead series, 2–1

New Orleans Arena, New Orleans, Louisiana
Attendance: 18,340
Referees: Joe Crawford, Bennett Salvatore, Sean Wright

TNT

April 24
9:30 pm

Recap

Los Angeles Lakers 88, New Orleans Hornets 93
Scoring by quarter: 25–22, 20–27, 22–20, 21–24
Pts: Kobe Bryant 17; Rebs: Andrew Bynum 9 Asts: Kobe Bryant 8	Pts: Chris Paul 27; Rebs: Chris Paul 13; Asts: Chris Paul 15
Series tied, 2–2

New Orleans Arena, New Orleans
Attendance: 18,083
Referees: Bob Delaney, Marc Davis, Zach Zarba

TNT

April 26
10:30 pm

Recap

New Orleans Hornets 90, Los Angeles Lakers 106
Scoring by quarter: 32–23, 19–31, 21–25, 18–27
Pts: Trevor Ariza 22; Rebs: Aaron Gray 6 Asts: Chris Paul 12	Pts: Kobe Bryant 19; Rebs: Andrew Bynum 10; Asts: Bryant, Gasol 4 each
LA Lakers lead series, 3–2

Staples Center, Los Angeles
Attendance: 18,997
Referees: Derrick Stafford, Ed Malloy, Rodney Mott

TNT

April 28
8:00 pm

Recap

Los Angeles Lakers 98, New Orleans Hornets 80
Scoring by quarter: 18–16, 22–18, 29–23, 29–23
Pts: Kobe Bryant 24; Rebs: Andrew Bynum 12; Asts: Ron Artest 5	Pts: Carl Landry 19; Rebs: Chris Paul 8 Asts: Chris Paul 11
LA Lakers win series, 4–2

New Orleans Arena, New Orleans
Attendance: 17,949
Referees: Mike Callahan, Ron Garretson, Tom Washington

Regular-season series

Los Angeles won 4–0 in the regular-season series

December 29, 2010

Recap

Los Angeles Lakers 103, New Orleans Hornets 88

New Orleans Arena, New Orleans

January 7, 2011

Recap

New Orleans Hornets 97, Los Angeles Lakers 101

Staples Center, Los Angeles

February 5, 2011

Recap

Los Angeles Lakers 101, New Orleans Hornets 95

New Orleans Arena, New Orleans

March 27, 2011

Recap

New Orleans Hornets 84, Los Angeles Lakers 102

Staples Center, Los Angeles

This was the first playoff meeting between the Lakers and the New Orleans Pelicans/Hornets franchise.

==== (3) Dallas Mavericks vs. (6) Portland Trail Blazers ====
ESPN

April 16
9:30 pm

Recap

Portland Trail Blazers 81, Dallas Mavericks 89
Scoring by quarter: 22–21, 15–26, 20–14, 24–28
Pts: LaMarcus Aldridge 27; Rebs: Marcus Camby 18; Asts: Andre Miller 6	Pts: Dirk Nowitzki 28; Rebs: Dirk Nowitzki 10; Asts: Jason Kidd 4
Dallas leads series, 1–0

American Airlines Center, Dallas, Texas
Attendance: 20,541
Referees: Mike Callahan, David Jones, Ken Mauer

TNT

April 19
9:30 pm

Recap

Portland Trail Blazers 89, Dallas Mavericks 101
Scoring by quarter: 24–22, 28–28, 20–23, 17–28
Pts: LaMarcus Aldridge 24; Rebs: LaMarcus Aldridge 10; Asts: Andre Miller 8	Pts: Dirk Nowitzki 33; Rebs: Tyson Chandler 10; Asts: Jason Kidd 8
Dallas leads series, 2–0

American Airlines Center, Dallas, Texas
Attendance: 20,620
Referees: Dan Crawford, Ed Malloy, Pat Fraher

TNT

April 21
10:30 pm

Recap

Dallas Mavericks 92, Portland Trail Blazers 97
Scoring by quarter: 23–28, 29–26, 20–21, 20–22
Pts: Jason Terry 29; Rebs: Dirk Nowitzki 9 Asts: Jason Terry 7	Pts: Wesley Matthews 25; Rebs: Gerald Wallace 11; Asts: Andre Miller 7
Dallas leads series, 2–1

Rose Garden, Portland, Oregon
Attendance: 20,217
Referees: Derrick Stafford, Eric Lewis, Jason Phillips

TNT

April 23
5:00 pm

Recap

Dallas Mavericks 82, Portland Trail Blazers 84
Scoring by quarter: 16–11, 21–24, 30–14, 15–35
Pts: Dirk Nowitzki 20; Rebs: Shawn Marion 11; Asts: Jason Kidd 4	Pts: Brandon Roy 24; Rebs: Gerald Wallace 11; Asts: Brandon Roy 5
Series tied, 2–2

Rose Garden, Portland, Oregon
Attendance: 20,357
Referees: Steve Javie, Bill Kennedy, Tony Brothers

NBA TV

April 25
8:30 pm

Recap

Portland Trail Blazers 82, Dallas Mavericks 93
Scoring by quarter: 20–15, 23–29, 20–31, 19–18
Pts: Andre Miller 18; Rebs: Aldridge, Wallace 9 each Asts: Andre Miller 7	Pts: Dirk Nowitzki 25; Rebs: Tyson Chandler 20; Asts: Jason Kidd 14
Dallas leads series, 3–2

American Airlines Center, Dallas, Texas
Attendance: 20,837
Referees: Scott Foster, John Goble, Tom Washington

TNT

April 28
10:30 pm

Recap

Dallas Mavericks 103, Portland Trail Blazers 96
Scoring by quarter: 19–27, 33–16, 23–19, 28–34
Pts: Dirk Nowitzki 33; Rebs: Dirk Nowitzki 11; Asts: Jason Terry 8	Pts: Gerald Wallace 32; Rebs: Gerald Wallace 12; Asts: Andre Miller 4
Dallas wins series, 4–2

Rose Garden, Portland, Oregon
Attendance: 20,494
Referees: Monty McCutchen, Greg Willard, Gary Zielinski

Regular-season series

Tied 2–2 in the regular-season series

December 15, 2010

Recap

Portland Trail Blazers 98, Dallas Mavericks 103

American Airlines Center, Dallas

January 4, 2011

Recap

Portland Trail Blazers 81, Dallas Mavericks 84

American Airlines Center, Dallas

March 15, 2011

Recap

Dallas Mavericks 101, Portland Trail Blazers 104

Rose Garden, Portland, Oregon

April 3, 2011

Recap

Dallas Mavericks 96, Portland Trail Blazers 104

Rose Garden, Portland, Oregon

This was the fourth playoff meeting between these two teams, with the Trail Blazers winning two of the first three meetings.

Previous playoff series
Portland leads 2–1 in all-time playoff series

1985

Dallas Mavericks 1, Portland Trail Blazers 3

1985 Western Conference First Round

1990

Dallas Mavericks 0, Portland Trail Blazers 3

1990 Western Conference First Round

2003

Dallas Mavericks 4, Portland Trail Blazers 3

2003 Western Conference First Round

The Mavericks won the first two games, but the Trail Blazers won Games 3 and 4 to tie the series. Portland played most of Game 4 from behind, including trailing Dallas by 23 points late in the third quarter. Although the Mavericks held a 67–49 lead after three quarters, the Trail Blazers pulled off their biggest fourth-quarter comeback in franchise history and won, 84–82, behind 18 points from Brandon Roy in the final quarter. Dallas recovered quickly from their Game 4 collapse, however, winning Games 5 and 6 to eliminate Portland.

==== (4) Oklahoma City Thunder vs. (5) Denver Nuggets ====
TNT

April 17
9:30 pm

Recap

Denver Nuggets 103, Oklahoma City Thunder 107
Scoring by quarter: 33–24, 27–35, 22–27, 21–21
Pts: Nenê 22; Rebs: Chandler, Nenê 8 each Asts: Raymond Felton 8	Pts: Kevin Durant 41; Rebs: Kevin Durant 9 Asts: Russell Westbrook 7
Oklahoma City leads series, 1–0

Oklahoma City Arena, Oklahoma City
Attendance: 18,203
Referees: Steve Javie, Zach Zarba, Bill Kennedy

TNT

April 20
8:00 pm

Recap

Denver Nuggets 89, Oklahoma City Thunder 106
Scoring by quarter: 15–31, 29–28, 22–22, 23–25
Pts: Ty Lawson 20; Rebs: Nenê 9 Asts: Ty Lawson 3	Pts: Kevin Durant 23; Rebs: Serge Ibaka 12; Asts: Russell Westbrook 7
Oklahoma City leads series, 2–0

Oklahoma City Arena, Oklahoma City
Attendance: 18,203
Referees: Monty McCutchen, Dick Bavetta, Rodney Mott

ESPN

April 23
10:00 pm

Recap

Oklahoma City Thunder 97, Denver Nuggets 94
Scoring by quarter: 26–31, 30–18, 15–24, 26–21
Pts: Kevin Durant 26; Rebs: Serge Ibaka 16; Asts: Russell Westbrook 8	Pts: Martin, Nenê, Smith 15 each Rebs: Nenê 10; Asts: Felton, Lawson, Nenê 4 each
Oklahoma City leads series, 3–0

Pepsi Center, Denver
Attendance: 19,958
Referees: Derrick Stafford, Jason Phillips, Eric Lewis

TNT

April 25
10:30 pm

Recap

Oklahoma City Thunder 101, Denver Nuggets 104
Scoring by quarter: 20–26, 25–19, 24–26, 32–33
Pts: Kevin Durant 31; Rebs: Serge Ibaka 14; Asts: Harden, Westbrook 5 each	Pts: Ty Lawson 27; Rebs: Martin, Nenê 9 each Asts: Danilo Gallinari 4
Oklahoma City leads series, 3–1

Pepsi Center, Denver, Colorado
Attendance: 19,155
Referees: Greg Willard, Ron Garretson, Michael Smith

TNT

April 27
9:30 pm

Recap

Denver Nuggets 97, Oklahoma City Thunder 100
Scoring by quarter: 28–25, 22–25, 26–22, 21–28
Pts: Arron Afflalo 15; Rebs: Kenyon Martin 10; Asts: Felton, Lawson 4 each	Pts: Kevin Durant 41; Rebs: Kendrick Perkins 9 Asts: Russell Westbrook 4
Oklahoma City wins series, 4–1

Oklahoma City Arena, Oklahoma City
Attendance: 18,203
Referees: Scott Foster, Bill Spooner, Pat Fraher

Regular-season series

Oklahoma City won 3–1 in the regular-season series

December 25, 2010

Recap

Denver Nuggets 106, Oklahoma City Thunder 114

Oklahoma City Arena, Oklahoma City

January 19, 2011

Recap

Oklahoma City Thunder 107, Denver Nuggets 112

Pepsi Center, Denver, Colorado

April 5, 2011

Recap

Oklahoma City Thunder 101, Denver Nuggets 94

Pepsi Center, Denver, Colorado

April 8, 2011

Recap

Denver Nuggets 89, Oklahoma City Thunder 104

Oklahoma City Arena, Oklahoma City

This was the fourth playoff meeting between these two teams, with the Nuggets winning two of the first three meetings. All previous meetings took place while the Thunder franchise were still known as the Seattle SuperSonics.

Previous playoff series
Denver leads 2–1 in all-time playoff series

1978

Denver Nuggets 2, Seattle SuperSonics 4

1978 Western Conference finals

1988

Denver Nuggets 3, Seattle SuperSonics 2

1988 Western Conference First Round

1994

Denver Nuggets 3, Seattle SuperSonics 2

1994 Western Conference First Round

- This is the most recent playoff series between the Thunder & Nuggets until 2025.

== Conference semifinals ==
=== Eastern Conference semifinals ===
==== (1) Chicago Bulls vs. (5) Atlanta Hawks ====
TNT

May 2
8:00 pm

Recap

Atlanta Hawks 103, Chicago Bulls 95
Scoring by quarter: 28–18, 23–32, 21–21, 31–24
Pts: Joe Johnson 34; Rebs: Al Horford 13; Asts: Jeff Teague 5	Pts: Derrick Rose 24; Rebs: Joakim Noah 9 Asts: Derrick Rose 10
Atlanta leads series, 1–0

United Center, Chicago
Attendance: 22,890
Referees: Monty McCutchen, John Goble, Ken Mauer

TNT

May 4
8:00 pm

Recap

Atlanta Hawks 73, Chicago Bulls 86
Scoring by quarter: 19–25, 18–23, 21–17, 15–21
Pts: Jeff Teague 21; Rebs: Al Horford 14; Asts: Al Horford 6	Pts: Derrick Rose 25; Rebs: Joakim Noah 14; Asts: Derrick Rose 10
Series tied, 1–1

United Center, Chicago
Attendance: 22,872
Referees: Scott Foster, Mike Callahan, Sean Wright

ESPN

May 6
7:00 pm

Recap

Chicago Bulls 99, Atlanta Hawks 82
Scoring by quarter: 29–23, 27–20, 24–20, 19–19
Pts: Derrick Rose 44; Rebs: Joakim Noah 15; Asts: Derrick Rose 7	Pts: Jeff Teague 21; Rebs: Josh Smith 13; Asts: Josh Smith 4
Chicago leads series, 2–1

Philips Arena, Atlanta
Attendance: 19,521
Referees: Greg Willard, Marc Davis, Ron Garretson

TNT

May 8
8:00 pm

Recap

Chicago Bulls 88, Atlanta Hawks 100
Scoring by quarter: 26–28, 20–19, 23–20, 19–33
Pts: Derrick Rose 34; Rebs: Joakim Noah 11; Asts: Derrick Rose 10	Pts: Joe Johnson 24; Rebs: Josh Smith 16; Asts: Josh Smith 8
Series tied, 2–2

Philips Arena, Atlanta
Attendance: 19,263
Referees: Dan Crawford, Bennett Salvatore, Gary Zielinski

TNT

May 10
8:00 pm

Recap

Atlanta Hawks 83, Chicago Bulls 95
Scoring by quarter: 21–32, 21–16, 26–21, 15–26
Pts: Jeff Teague 21; Rebs: Al Horford 10; Asts: Jeff Teague 7	Pts: Derrick Rose 33; Rebs: Carlos Boozer 12; Asts: Derrick Rose 9
Chicago leads series, 3–2

United Center, Chicago
Attendance: 22,980
Referees: Steve Javie, Tom Washington, Bill Kennedy

ESPN

May 12
8:00 pm

Recap

Chicago Bulls 93, Atlanta Hawks 73
Scoring by quarter: 27–17, 18–18, 25–18, 23–20
Pts: Carlos Boozer 23; Rebs: Carlos Boozer 10; Asts: Derrick Rose 12	Pts: Joe Johnson 19; Rebs: Zaza Pachulia 13; Asts: Joe Johnson 4
Chicago wins series, 4–2

Philips Arena, Atlanta
Attendance: 19,378
Referees: Joe Crawford, Ed Malloy, Bob Delaney

Regular-season series

Chicago won 2–1 in the regular-season series

March 2, 2011

Recap

Chicago Bulls 80, Atlanta Hawks 83

Philips Arena, Atlanta

March 11, 2011

Recap

Atlanta Hawks 76, Chicago Bulls 94

United Center, Chicago, Illinois

March 22, 2011

Recap

Chicago Bulls 114, Atlanta Hawks 81

Philips Arena, Atlanta

This was the fifth playoff meeting between these two teams, with the each team winning two series apiece.

Previous playoff series
Tied 2–2 in all-time playoff series

1967

St. Louis Hawks 3, Chicago Bulls 0

1967 Western Division semifinals

1970

Atlanta Hawks 4, Chicago Bulls 1

1970 Western Division semifinals

1993

Atlanta Hawks 0, Chicago Bulls 3

1993 Eastern Conference First Round

1997

Atlanta Hawks 1, Chicago Bulls 4

1997 Eastern Conference semifinals

==== (2) Miami Heat vs. (3) Boston Celtics ====
ABC

May 1
3:30 pm

Recap

Boston Celtics 90, Miami Heat 99
Scoring by quarter: 14–20, 22–31, 26–25, 28–23
Pts: Ray Allen 25; Rebs: Kevin Garnett 8 Asts: Rajon Rondo 7	Pts: Dwyane Wade 38; Rebs: Chris Bosh 12; Asts: James, Wade 5 each
Miami leads series, 1–0

American Airlines Arena, Miami
Attendance: 20,021
Referees: Dan Crawford, Ed Malloy, Derrick Collins

TNT

May 3
7:00 pm

Recap

Boston Celtics 91, Miami Heat 102
Scoring by quarter: 26–27, 16–20, 25–25, 24–30
Pts: Rajon Rondo 20; Rebs: Jermaine O'Neal 9 Asts: Rajon Rondo 12	Pts: LeBron James 35; Rebs: Chris Bosh 11; Asts: Chris Bosh 4
Miami leads series, 2–0

American Airlines Arena, Miami
Attendance: 20,104
Referees: Joe Crawford, Jason Phillips, Greg Willard

ABC

May 7
8:00 pm

Recap

Miami Heat 81, Boston Celtics 97
Scoring by quarter: 21–27, 25–17, 15–28, 20–25
Pts: Dwyane Wade 23; Rebs: Joel Anthony 11; Asts: Dwyane Wade 7	Pts: Kevin Garnett 28; Rebs: Kevin Garnett 18; Asts: Rajon Rondo 11
Miami leads series, 2–1

TD Garden, Boston
Attendance: 18,624
Referees: Steve Javie, Bob Delaney, Bill Kennedy

TNT

May 9
7:00 pm

Recap

Miami Heat 98, Boston Celtics 90 (OT)
Scoring by quarter: 28–31, 22–22, 19–20, 17–13, Overtime: 12–4
Pts: LeBron James 35; Rebs: LeBron James 14; Asts: Dwyane Wade 4	Pts: Paul Pierce 27; Rebs: Kevin Garnett 10; Asts: Rajon Rondo 5
Miami leads series, 3–1

TD Garden, Boston
Attendance: 18,624
Referees: Tony Brothers, Monty McCutchen, Derrick Stafford

TNT

May 11
7:00 pm

Recap

Boston Celtics 87, Miami Heat 97
Scoring by quarter: 24–16, 25–31, 24–24, 14–26
Pts: Ray Allen 18; Rebs: Kevin Garnett 11; Asts: Paul Pierce 4	Pts: Dwyane Wade 34; Rebs: Chris Bosh 11; Asts: Dwyane Wade 5
Miami wins series, 4–1

American Airlines Arena, Miami
Attendance: 20,208
Referees: Scott Foster, Ron Garretson, Bill Spooner

- Game 4 is Shaquille O'Neal's final NBA game.

Regular-season series

Boston won 3–1 in the regular-season series

October 26, 2010

Recap

Miami Heat 80, Boston Celtics 88

TD Garden, Boston

November 11, 2010

Recap

Boston Celtics 112, Miami Heat 107

American Airlines Arena, Miami

February 13, 2011

Recap

Miami Heat 82, Boston Celtics 85

TD Garden, Boston

April 10, 2011

Recap

Boston Celtics 77, Miami Heat 100

American Airlines Arena, Miami

This was the second playoff meeting between these two teams, with the Celtics winning the first meeting.

Previous playoff series
Boston leads 1–0 in all-time playoff series

2010

Boston Celtics 4, Miami Heat 1

2010 Eastern Conference First Round

The series was seen as an opportunity for Heat small forward LeBron James to exact revenge on the Celtics after Boston eliminated James' former team, the Cleveland Cavaliers, in 2008 and 2010. James called the series "personal", saying "...You don't want to keeping getting beat by the same team, the same team keep sending you home to plan a vacation..."

The Heat won the first two games, but the Celtics won Game 3, 97–81. In that game, Boston point guard Rajon Rondo dislocated his left elbow on a bizarre play in the third quarter where he became tangled up with Dwyane Wade. Rondo still contributed to the Celtics' victory, scoring four points in the fourth quarter after the injury and finishing with 11 assists. However, his left arm was visibly limp for the remainder of the series and he was unable to play at his usual level of ability.

Miami bounced back after the Game 3 loss to win the series, 4–1, returning to their first Eastern Conference finals since the 2006 NBA playoffs.

=== Western Conference semifinals ===
==== (2) Los Angeles Lakers vs. (3) Dallas Mavericks ====
TNT

May 2
10:30 pm

Recap

Dallas Mavericks 96, Los Angeles Lakers 94
Scoring by quarter: 25–23, 19–30, 27–25, 25–16
Pts: Dirk Nowitzki 28; Rebs: Dirk Nowitzki 14; Asts: Jason Kidd 11	Pts: Kobe Bryant 36; Rebs: Lamar Odom 12; Asts: Pau Gasol 7
Dallas leads series, 1–0

Staples Center, Los Angeles
Attendance: 18,997
Referees: Steve Javie, Bob Delaney, Michael Smith

TNT

May 4
10:30 pm

Recap

Dallas Mavericks 93, Los Angeles Lakers 81
Scoring by quarter: 26–20, 25–29, 17–13, 25–19
Pts: Dirk Nowitzki 24; Rebs: Shawn Marion 9 Asts: Jason Kidd 6	Pts: Kobe Bryant 23; Rebs: Andrew Bynum 13; Asts: Derek Fisher 5
Dallas leads series, 2–0

Staples Center, Los Angeles
Attendance: 18,997
Referees: Monty McCutchen, Bennett Salvatore, Bill Spooner

ESPN

May 6
9:30 pm

Recap

Los Angeles Lakers 92, Dallas Mavericks 98
Scoring by quarter: 27–29, 24–18, 21–19, 20–32
Pts: Andrew Bynum 21; Rebs: Andrew Bynum 10; Asts: Kobe Bryant 6	Pts: Dirk Nowitzki 32; Rebs: Dirk Nowitzki 9 Asts: Jason Kidd 9
Dallas leads series, 3–0

American Airlines Center, Dallas
Attendance: 21,156
Referees: Derrick Stafford, Ed Malloy, Tom Washington

ABC

May 8
3:30 pm

Recap

Los Angeles Lakers 86, Dallas Mavericks 122
Scoring by quarter: 23–27, 16–36, 23–23, 24–36
Pts: Kobe Bryant 17; Rebs: Pau Gasol 8 Asts: Pau Gasol 6	Pts: Jason Terry 32; Rebs: Tyson Chandler 9 Asts: José Juan Barea 8
Dallas wins series, 4–0

American Airlines Center, Dallas
Attendance: 21,087
Referees: Jason Phillips, Ron Garretson, Scott Foster

Regular-season series

Los Angeles won 2–1 in the regular-season series

January 19, 2011

Recap

Los Angeles Lakers 100, Dallas Mavericks 109

American Airlines Center, Dallas

March 12, 2011

Recap

Los Angeles Lakers 96, Dallas Mavericks 91

American Airlines Center, Dallas

March 31, 2011

Recap

Dallas Mavericks 82, Los Angeles Lakers 110

Staples Center, Los Angeles

This was the fourth playoff meeting between these two teams, with the Lakers winning the first three meetings.

Previous playoff series
Los Angeles leads 3–0 in all-time playoff series

1984

Dallas Mavericks 1, Los Angeles Lakers 4

1984 Western Conference semifinals

1986

Dallas Mavericks 2, Los Angeles Lakers 4

1986 Western Conference semifinals

1988

Dallas Mavericks 3, Los Angeles Lakers 4

1988 Western Conference finals

The Mavericks won the first two games in Los Angeles, including overcoming a 16-point deficit late in the third quarter of Game 1. Dallas overcame another second-half deficit to win Game 3, 98–92. In Game 4, the Mavericks blew out the Lakers, 122–86, sweeping the two-time defending NBA champions. Dallas equaled an NBA record in that game by sinking 20 three-pointers. Mavericks sixth man Jason Terry led the team in scoring with 32 points while making nine of his ten long-range attempts, tying another NBA playoff record that would go unequaled for nearly five years. Also in the same game, Andrew Bynum was ejected—and eventually fined and suspended for five games of the next season—after committing a flagrant foul on J. J. Barea.

This series was the one and only time a team coached by Phil Jackson was swept out of the NBA Playoffs.

==== (4) Oklahoma City Thunder vs. (8) Memphis Grizzlies ====
ABC

May 1
1:00 pm

Recap

Memphis Grizzlies 114, Oklahoma City Thunder 101
Scoring by quarter: 28–24, 29–23, 27–24, 30–30
Pts: Zach Randolph 34; Rebs: Marc Gasol 13; Asts: Mike Conley Jr. 7	Pts: Kevin Durant 33; Rebs: Durant, Ibaka 11 each Asts: Russell Westbrook 6
Memphis leads series, 1–0

Oklahoma City Arena, Oklahoma City
Attendance: 18,203
Referees: Joe Crawford, Marc Davis, Zach Zarba

TNT

May 3
9:30 pm

Recap

Memphis Grizzlies 102, Oklahoma City Thunder 111
Scoring by quarter: 17–28, 27–26, 24–22, 34–35
Pts: Mike Conley Jr. 24; Rebs: Marc Gasol 10; Asts: Mike Conley Jr. 8	Pts: Kevin Durant 26; Rebs: Nick Collison 7 Asts: Russell Westbrook 6
Series tied, 1–1

Oklahoma City Arena, Oklahoma City
Attendance: 18,203
Referees: Derrick Stafford, Tony Brothers, Bill Kennedy

ESPN

May 7
5:00 pm

Recap

Oklahoma City Thunder 93, Memphis Grizzlies 101 (OT)
Scoring by quarter: 20–22, 31–21, 25–20, 10–23, Overtime: 7–15
Pts: Russell Westbrook 23; Rebs: Kendrick Perkins 13; Asts: Russell Westbrook 12	Pts: Zach Randolph 21; Rebs: Zach Randolph 21; Asts: Conley, Mayo 4 each
Memphis leads series, 2–1

FedExForum, Memphis, Tennessee
Attendance: 18,119
Referees: Mike Callahan, Ken Mauer, Pat Fraher

TNT

May 9
9:30 pm

Recap

Oklahoma City Thunder 133, Memphis Grizzlies 123 (3OT)
Scoring by quarter: 16–28, 33–25, 22–19, 25–24, Overtime: 13–13, 10–10, 14–4
Pts: Russell Westbrook 40; Rebs: Kevin Durant 13; Asts: James Harden 7	Pts: Zach Randolph 34; Rebs: Marc Gasol 21; Asts: Conley, Mayo 5 each
Series tied, 2–2

FedExForum, Memphis, Tennessee
Attendance: 18,119
Referees: Greg Willard, John Goble, Bill Spooner

TNT

May 11
9:30 pm

Recap

Memphis Grizzlies 72, Oklahoma City Thunder 99
Scoring by quarter: 17–17, 18–29, 17–25, 20–28
Pts: Marc Gasol 15; Rebs: Zach Randolph 17; Asts: Conley, Mayo 4 each	Pts: Kevin Durant 19; Rebs: Nick Collison 10; Asts: Eric Maynor 9
Oklahoma City leads series, 3–2

Oklahoma City Arena, Oklahoma City
Attendance: 18,203
Referees: Monty McCutchen, Bennett Salvatore, Jason Phillips

ESPN

May 13
9:00 pm

Recap

Oklahoma City Thunder 83, Memphis Grizzlies 95
Scoring by quarter: 21–23, 33–21, 14–28, 15–23
Pts: Russell Westbrook 27; Rebs: Durant, Perkins 7 each Asts: James Harden 5	Pts: Zach Randolph 30; Rebs: Zach Randolph 13; Asts: Mike Conley Jr. 12
Series tied, 3–3

FedExForum, Memphis, Tennessee
Attendance: 18,119
Referees: Scott Foster, Marc Davis, Ron Garretson

ABC

May 15
3:30 pm

Recap

Memphis Grizzlies 90, Oklahoma City Thunder 105
Scoring by quarter: 17–21, 17–21, 24–30, 32–33
Pts: Mike Conley Jr. 18; Rebs: Zach Randolph 10; Asts: Mike Conley Jr. 6	Pts: Kevin Durant 39; Rebs: Nick Collison 12; Asts: Russell Westbrook 14
Oklahoma City wins series, 4–3

Oklahoma City Arena, Oklahoma City
Attendance: 18,203
Referees: Steve Javie, Ed Malloy, Mike Callahan

Regular-season series

Memphis won 3–1 in the regular-season series

January 4, 2011

Recap

Oklahoma City Thunder 105, Memphis Grizzlies 110

FedExForum, Memphis, Tennessee

January 8, 2011

Recap

Memphis Grizzlies 100, Oklahoma City Thunder 109

Oklahoma City Arena, Oklahoma City

February 8, 2011

Recap

Memphis Grizzlies 105, Oklahoma City Thunder 101 (OT)

Oklahoma City Arena, Oklahoma City

March 7, 2011

Recap

Oklahoma City Thunder 101, Memphis Grizzlies 107

FedExForum, Memphis, Tennessee

This was the first playoff meeting between the Grizzlies and the Thunder.

The Grizzlies and Thunder split the first two games. Memphis took a 2–1 series lead after overcoming a 16-point deficit late in the third quarter of Game 3. The Thunder tied the series back up in Game 4 with a 133–123 victory in triple overtime. Oklahoma City blew out the Grizzlies in Game 5, 99–72, but Memphis tied the series again in Game 6. The Thunder finally advanced to their first conference finals since they moved from Seattle by eliminating the Grizzlies in seven games. In the finale, Russell Westbrook became the fifth player to record a triple double in a Game 7.

== Conference finals ==
=== Eastern Conference finals ===
==== (1) Chicago Bulls vs. (2) Miami Heat ====
TNT

May 15
8:00 pm

Recap

Miami Heat 82, Chicago Bulls 103
Scoring by quarter: 23–20, 25–28, 15–24, 19–31
Pts: Chris Bosh 30; Rebs: Chris Bosh 9 Asts: LeBron James 6	Pts: Derrick Rose 28; Rebs: Joakim Noah 14; Asts: Derrick Rose 6
Chicago leads series, 1–0

United Center, Chicago
Attendance: 22,874
Referees: Dan Crawford, Michael Smith, Ken Mauer

TNT

May 18
8:30 pm

Recap

Miami Heat 85, Chicago Bulls 75
Scoring by quarter: 19–26, 29–20, 23–19, 14–10
Pts: LeBron James 29; Rebs: LeBron James 10; Asts: LeBron James 5	Pts: Derrick Rose 21; Rebs: Boozer, Noah 8 each Asts: Derrick Rose 8
Series tied, 1–1

United Center, Chicago
Attendance: 23,007
Referees: Monty McCutchen, Derrick Stafford, Jason Phillips

TNT

May 22
8:30 pm

Recap

Chicago Bulls 85, Miami Heat 96
Scoring by quarter: 15–18, 25–25, 25–25, 20–28
Pts: Carlos Boozer 26; Rebs: Carlos Boozer 17; Asts: Joakim Noah 6	Pts: Chris Bosh 34; Rebs: Dwyane Wade 9 Asts: LeBron James 10
Miami leads series, 2–1

American Airlines Arena, Miami
Attendance: 20,123
Referees: Steve Javie, Mike Callahan, Ron Garretson

TNT

May 24
8:30 pm

Recap

Chicago Bulls 93, Miami Heat 101 (OT)
Scoring by quarter: 19–16, 27–28, 22–19, 17–22, Overtime: 8–16
Pts: Derrick Rose 23; Rebs: Joakim Noah 14; Asts: Noah, Rose 6 each	Pts: LeBron James 35; Rebs: Haslem, Miller 9 each Asts: LeBron James 6
Miami leads series, 3–1

American Airlines Arena, Miami
Attendance: 20,125
Referees: Joe Crawford, Ed Malloy, Bennett Salvatore

TNT

May 26
8:30 pm

Recap

Miami Heat 83, Chicago Bulls 80
Scoring by quarter: 21–25, 17–20, 19–17, 26–18
Pts: LeBron James 28; Rebs: LeBron James 11; Asts: LeBron James 6	Pts: Derrick Rose 25; Rebs: Noah, Thomas 8 each Asts: Derrick Rose 8
Miami wins series, 4–1

United Center, Chicago
Attendance: 23,057
Referees: Scott Foster, Marc Davis, Greg Willard

Regular-season series

Chicago won 3–0 in the regular-season series

January 15, 2011

Recap

Miami Heat 96, Chicago Bulls 99

United Center, Chicago, Illinois

February 24, 2011

Recap

Miami Heat 89, Chicago Bulls 93

United Center, Chicago, Illinois

March 6, 2011

Recap

Chicago Bulls 87, Miami Heat 86

American Airlines Arena, Miami

This was the sixth playoff meeting between these two teams, with the Bulls winning four of the first five meetings.

Previous playoff series
Chicago leads 4–1 in all-time playoff series

1992

Chicago Bulls 3, Miami Heat 0

1992 Eastern Conference First Round

1996

Chicago Bulls 3, Miami Heat 0

1996 Eastern Conference First Round

1997

Chicago Bulls 4, Miami Heat 1

1997 Eastern Conference finals

2006

Chicago Bulls 2, Miami Heat 4

2006 Eastern Conference First Round

2007

Chicago Bulls 4, Miami Heat 0

2007 Eastern Conference First Round

Chicago swept Miami in the regular season en route to the league's best record and also blew out the Heat in Game 1 of the conference finals, 103–82. However, Miami advanced to the NBA Finals by capturing the next four games. In Game 5, the Heat erased a 12-point deficit with three minutes remaining to eliminate the Bulls, 83–80.

This series marked the only time all season that the Bulls lost more than two consecutive games.

=== Western Conference finals ===
==== (3) Dallas Mavericks vs. (4) Oklahoma City Thunder ====
ESPN

May 17
9:00 pm

Recap

Oklahoma City Thunder 112, Dallas Mavericks 121
Scoring by quarter: 27–20, 21–35, 31–35, 33–31
Pts: Kevin Durant 40; Rebs: Kevin Durant 8 Asts: Kevin Durant 5	Pts: Dirk Nowitzki 48; Rebs: Tyson Chandler 8 Asts: Jason Kidd 11
Dallas leads series, 1–0

American Airlines Center, Dallas
Attendance: 20,911
Referees: Joe Crawford, Bill Kennedy, Zach Zarba

ESPN

May 19
9:00 pm

Recap

Oklahoma City Thunder 106, Dallas Mavericks 100
Scoring by quarter: 26–31, 33–26, 18–19, 29–24
Pts: Kevin Durant 24; Rebs: Collison, Harden 7 each Asts: Durant, Harden, Westbrook 4 each	Pts: Dirk Nowitzki 29; Rebs: Tyson Chandler 13; Asts: Jason Kidd 7
Series tied, 1–1

American Airlines Center, Dallas
Attendance: 21,051
Referees: Greg Willard, Bill Spooner, Tom Washington

ESPN

May 21
9:00 pm

Recap

Dallas Mavericks 93, Oklahoma City Thunder 87
Scoring by quarter: 27–12, 25–24, 18–20, 23–31
Pts: Marion, Nowitzki 18 each Rebs: Tyson Chandler 15; Asts: Jason Kidd 8	Pts: Russell Westbrook 30; Rebs: Kevin Durant 12; Asts: Kevin Durant 5
Dallas leads series, 2–1

Oklahoma City Arena, Oklahoma City
Attendance: 18,203
Referees: Scott Foster, Marc Davis, Bob Delaney

ESPN

May 23
9:00 pm

Recap

Dallas Mavericks 112, Oklahoma City Thunder 105 (OT)
Scoring by quarter: 22–31, 32–28, 23–22, 24–20, Overtime: 11–4
Pts: Dirk Nowitzki 40; Rebs: Tyson Chandler 8 Asts: Jason Kidd 7	Pts: Kevin Durant 29; Rebs: Kevin Durant 15; Asts: Russell Westbrook 8
Dallas leads series, 3–1

Oklahoma City Arena, Oklahoma City
Attendance: 18,203
Referees: Dan Crawford, Tony Brothers, Ken Mauer

ESPN

May 25
9:00 pm

Recap

Oklahoma City Thunder 96, Dallas Mavericks 100
Scoring by quarter: 27–26, 28–26, 21–20, 20–28
Pts: Russell Westbrook 31; Rebs: Nick Collison 12; Asts: James Harden 6	Pts: Marion, Nowitzki 26 each Rebs: Chandler, Nowitzki 9 each Asts: Jason Kidd 10
Dallas wins series, 4–1

American Airlines Center, Dallas
Attendance: 21,092
Referees: Monty McCutchen, Jason Phillips, Derrick Stafford

Regular-season series

Dallas won 2–1 in the regular-season series

November 24, 2010

Recap

Dallas Mavericks 111, Oklahoma City Thunder 103

Oklahoma City Arena, Oklahoma City

December 27, 2010

Recap

Dallas Mavericks 103, Oklahoma City Thunder 93

Oklahoma City Arena, Oklahoma City

January 6, 2011

Recap

Oklahoma City Thunder 99, Dallas Mavericks 95

American Airlines Center, Dallas

This was the third playoff series between these two teams, with each team having won one of the prior series. Both previous meetings took place when the Thunder franchise was still known as the Seattle SuperSonics.

Previous playoff series
Tied 1–1 in all-time playoff series

1984

Dallas Mavericks 3, Seattle SuperSonics 2

1984 Western Conference First Round

1987

Dallas Mavericks 1, Seattle SuperSonics 3

1987 Western Conference First Round

In Game 1 of the Western Conference Finals, Dirk Nowitzki of Dallas set a playoff record for most free throws made without a miss with 24, previously held by Paul Pierce (21) in 2003. The Mavericks won, 121–112. The Thunder and Mavericks then split the next two games. In Game 4, Dallas rallied from a 15-point deficit with five minutes left in regulation to win in overtime for a 3–1 series lead. The Mavericks then wiped out another deficit late in Game 5 to win the game, 100–96, and reach their first NBA Finals since 2006. It would be the last time that neither a #1 seed nor a #2 seed reached a Conference finals until 2020.

== NBA Finals: (E2) Miami Heat vs. (W3) Dallas Mavericks ==
ABC

May 31
9:00 pm

Recap

Dallas Mavericks 84, Miami Heat 92
Scoring by quarter: 17–16, 27–27, 17–22, 23–27
Pts: Dirk Nowitzki 27; Rebs: Shawn Marion 10; Asts: Jason Kidd 6	Pts: LeBron James 24; Rebs: Dwyane Wade 10; Asts: Dwyane Wade 6
Miami leads series, 1–0

American Airlines Arena, Miami
Attendance: 20,003
Referees: Steve Javie, Mike Callahan, Bill Kennedy

ABC

June 2
9:00 pm

Recap

Dallas Mavericks 95, Miami Heat 93
Scoring by quarter: 28–28, 23–23, 20–24, 24–18
Pts: Dirk Nowitzki 24; Rebs: Dirk Nowitzki 11; Asts: Terry, Kidd 5 each	Pts: Dwyane Wade 36; Rebs: James, Bosh 8 each Asts: Dwyane Wade 6
Series tied, 1–1

American Airlines Arena, Miami
Attendance: 20,003
Referees: Joe Crawford, Ed Malloy, Ken Mauer

ABC

June 5
8:00 pm

Recap

Miami Heat 88, Dallas Mavericks 86
Scoring by quarter: 29–22, 18–20, 20–22, 21–22
Pts: Dwyane Wade 29; Rebs: Dwyane Wade 11; Asts: LeBron James 9	Pts: Dirk Nowitzki 34; Rebs: Chandler, Nowitzki 11 each Asts: Jason Kidd 10
Miami leads series, 2–1

American Airlines Center, Dallas
Attendance: 20,340
Referees: Dan Crawford, Scott Foster, Derrick Stafford

ABC

June 7
9:00 pm

Recap

Miami Heat 83, Dallas Mavericks 86
Scoring by quarter: 21–21, 26–24, 22–20, 14–21
Pts: Dwyane Wade 32; Rebs: LeBron James 9 Asts: LeBron James 7	Pts: Dirk Nowitzki 21; Rebs: Tyson Chandler 16; Asts: José Juan Barea 4
Series tied, 2–2

American Airlines Center, Dallas
Attendance: 20,340
Referees: Monty Mccutchen, Marc Davis, Greg Willard

ABC

June 9
9:00 pm

Recap

Miami Heat 103, Dallas Mavericks 112
Scoring by quarter: 31–30, 26–30, 22–24, 24–28
Pts: Dwyane Wade 23; Rebs: James, Bosh 10 each Asts: LeBron James 10	Pts: Dirk Nowitzki 29; Rebs: Tyson Chandler 7 Asts: Kidd, Terry 6 each
Dallas leads series, 3–2

American Airlines Center, Dallas
Attendance: 20,340
Referees: Joe Crawford, Mike Callahan, Bill Kennedy

ABC

June 12
8:00 pm

Recap

Dallas Mavericks 105, Miami Heat 95
Scoring by quarter: 32–27, 21–24, 28–21, 24–23
Pts: Jason Terry 27; Rebs: Dirk Nowitzki 11; Asts: Jason Kidd 8	Pts: LeBron James 21; Rebs: Udonis Haslem 9 Asts: Mario Chalmers 7
Dallas wins series, 4–2

American Airlines Arena, Miami
Attendance: 20,003
Referees: Steve Javie, Scott Foster, Derrick Stafford

Regular-season series

Dallas won 2–0 in the regular-season series

November 27, 2010

Recap

Miami Heat 95, Dallas Mavericks 106

American Airlines Center, Dallas

December 20, 2010

Recap

Dallas Mavericks 98, Miami Heat 96

American Airlines Arena, Miami

This was the second playoff meeting between these two teams, with the Heat winning the first meeting.

Previous playoff series
Miami leads 1–0 in all-time playoff series

2006

Dallas Mavericks 2, Miami Heat 4

2006 NBA Finals

== Statistic leaders ==
Category	High			Average			
Category	Player	Team	Total	Player	Team	Avg.	Games played
Points	Dirk Nowitzki	Dallas Mavericks	48	Kevin Durant	Oklahoma City Thunder	28.6	17
Rebounds	Marc Gasol; Zach Randolph	Memphis Grizzlies; Memphis Grizzlies	21	Dwight Howard	Orlando Magic	15.5	6
Assists	Rajon Rondo	Boston Celtics	20	Chris Paul	New Orleans Hornets	11.5	6
Steals	Kobe Bryant; Luol Deng; Joe Johnson; Jason Kidd	Los Angeles Lakers; Chicago Bulls; Atlanta Hawks; Dallas Mavericks	5	Manu Ginóbili	San Antonio Spurs	2.6	5
Blocks	Serge Ibaka	Oklahoma City Thunder	9	Serge Ibaka	Oklahoma City Thunder	3.1	17
