= 2003–04 Eastern Washington Eagles men's basketball team =

American college basketball season

2003–04 Eastern Washington Eagles men's basketball

Big Sky regular season co–champions Big Sky tournament champions

NCAA tournament, First round
- Conference: Big Sky Conference
- Record: 17–13 (11–3 Big Sky)
- Head coach: Ray Giacoletti (4th season)
- Home arena: Reese Court

2003–04 Big Sky men's basketball standings
	Conf.				Overall
Team	W		L	PCT	W		L	PCT
Eastern Washington †	11	–	3	.786	17	–	13	.567
Northern Arizona	7	–	7	.500	15	–	14	.517
Weber State	7	–	7	.500	15	–	14	.517
Sacramento State	7	–	7	.500	13	–	15	.464
Idaho State	7	–	7	.500	13	–	18	.419
Montana State	6	–	8	.429	14	–	13	.519
Montana	6	–	8	.429	10	–	18	.357
Portland State	5	–	9	.357	11	–	16	.407
† Conference tournament winner

The 2003–04 Eastern Washington Eagles men's basketball team represented Eastern Washington University during the 2003–04 NCAA Division I men's basketball season. The Eagles were led by fourth year head coach Ray Giacoletti and played their home games at Reese Court. They were members of the Big Sky Conference. They finished the season 17–13, 11–3 in Big Sky play to finish in a share for the regular season Big Sky championship. They defeated Weber State and Northern Arizona to be champions of the Big Sky tournament. They received an automatic bid to the NCAA tournament – the first appearance in school history – where they lost in the opening round to No. 2 seed and eventual Final Four participant Oklahoma State, 75–56.

== Roster ==
2003–04 Eastern Washington Eagles men's basketball team
Players	Coaches
Pos. / # / Name / Height / Weight / Year / Hometown; G / 52 / Alvin Snow / 6 ft 2 in (1.88 m) / 215 lb (98 kg) / Sr / Seattle, Washington	Head coach: Ray Giacoletti (Minto State); Assistant coach(es) Legend: (C) Team captain; (S) Suspended; (I) Ineligible; (W) Walk-on; Injured; Current redshirt; Roster

== Schedule and results ==
Date time, TV	Rank^{#}	Opponent^{#}	Result	Record	Site (attendance) city, state
Regular season
Dec 5, 2003*		at Iowa; Gazette-Hawkeye Challenge	L 54–70	2–4	Carver-Hawkeye Arena (11,031); Iowa City, Iowa
Dec 6, 2003*		vs. Illinois-Chicago; Gazette-Hawkeye Challenge	L 52–67	2–5	Carver-Hawkeye Arena (11,260); Iowa City, Iowa
Big Sky tournament
Mar 9, 2004*		Weber State; Semifinals	W 72–53	16–12	Reese Court (4,247); Cheney, Washington
Mar 10, 2004*		Northern Arizona; Championship game	W 71–59	17–12	Reese Court (4,615); Cheney, Washington
NCAA tournament
Mar 19, 2004*	(15 E)	vs. (2 E) No. 4 Oklahoma State; First round	L 56–75	17–13	Kemper Arena (16,840); Kansas City, Missouri
*Non-conference game. ^{#}Rankings from AP Poll. (#) Tournament seedings in parentheses. E=East. All times are in Pacific Time.
