= Danny Granger =

American basketball player (born 1983)

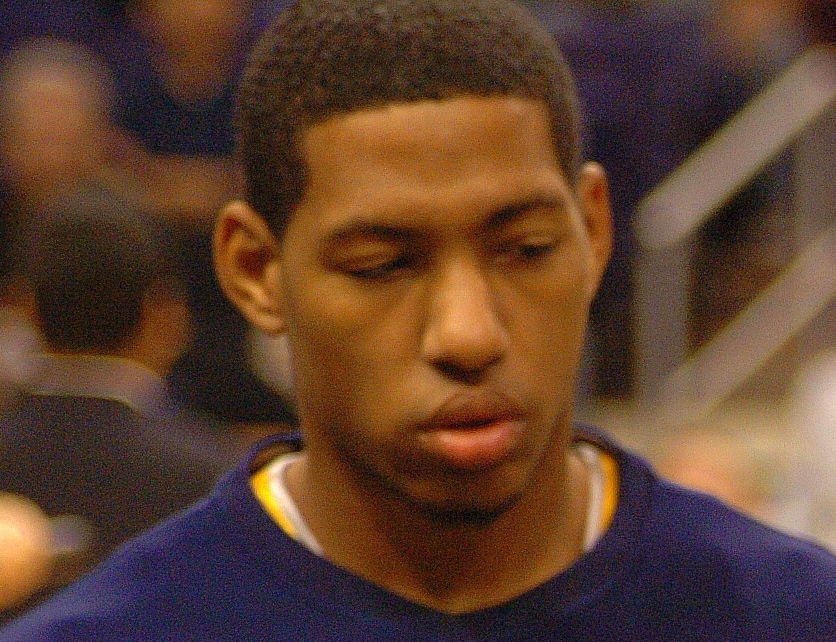
- Granger with the Indiana Pacers in 2005

Personal information
- Born: April 20, 1983 (age 43) New Orleans, Louisiana, U.S.
- Listed height: 6 ft 9 in (2.06 m)
- Listed weight: 222 lb (101 kg)

Career information
- High school: Grace King (Metairie, Louisiana)
- College: Bradley (2001–2003); New Mexico (2003–2005)
- NBA draft: 2005: 1st round, 17th overall pick
- Drafted by: Indiana Pacers
- Playing career: 2005–2015
- Position: Small forward
- Number: 33, 22

Career history
- 2005–2014: Indiana Pacers
- 2014: Los Angeles Clippers
- 2014–2015: Miami Heat

Career highlights
- NBA All-Star (2009); NBA Most Improved Player (2009); NBA All-Rookie Second Team (2006); 2× First-team All-MWC (2004, 2005); MVC All-Freshmen Team (2002)

Career NBA statistics
- Points: 9,855 (16.8 ppg)
- Rebounds: 2,888 (4.9 rpg)
- Assists: 1,097 (1.9 apg)
- Stats at NBA.com
- Stats at Basketball Reference
Medals
Representing United States
FIBA World Championship
Gold medal – first place	2010 Turkey	National team

Danny Granger Jr. (born April 20, 1983) is an American former professional basketball player who played ten seasons in the National Basketball Association (NBA). He was drafted by the Indiana Pacers in 2005 after a two-year college stint at New Mexico. In 2009, Granger averaged 26 points per game on 45 percent shooting and was named an All-Star and the league's Most Improved Player. An injury to his left knee limited Granger to just five games during the 2012–13 season, and in February 2014, he was traded to the Philadelphia 76ers. He went on to play for the Los Angeles Clippers and Miami Heat before having short stints with the Phoenix Suns and Detroit Pistons in 2015.

== High school career ==
Granger attended Grace King High School in Metairie, Louisiana. A four-year letterman at Grace King, he averaged 24.3 points, 12 rebounds and 5.5 blocks per game as a senior. He was a McDonald's All-American nominee before his senior year. He scored a 30 on his ACT and was accepted to Yale University. Granger ultimately chose to attend and play college basketball at Bradley University in order to study Civil Engineering, which was not offered at Yale.

== College career ==
=== Bradley (2001–2003) ===
Granger made the Missouri Valley Conference All-Freshman team for Bradley in 2001–02, averaging 11.1 points and 7.1 rebounds a game.

He transferred to New Mexico after the first semester of his sophomore season, having averaged 19.2 points and 7.9 rebounds for the Braves. He said the reason for the transfer was because of Bradley head coach Jim Les's intimidating tactics, including being "verbally abusive."

=== New Mexico (2003–2005) ===
==== Junior ====
Granger wasn't eligible to start playing for the Lobos until January 2004, but he averaged a career-best 19.5 points per game and also led the Lobos in rebounding, steals, and blocks as a junior in 2003–04. He became the first Lobos player to lead the team in all those categories in the same season and was awarded the Bob King Team MVP Award. He was the second Lobo in 33 years, and the fifth all-time, to average more than 19 points and nine rebounds for an entire season, joining Luc Longley, Willie Long, Mel Daniels and Ira Harge. A First Team All-Mountain West Conference selection, Granger was twice named the league's Player of the Week for the weeks ending December 22 and January 25.

==== Senior ====
As a senior in 2004–05, Granger was the only player in the NCAA to average at least 18.8 points and 8.9 rebounds per game, while also averaging at least 2.0 blocks, 2.0 steals, and 2.0 assists. He led the team in scoring, rebounding, steals and blocked shots for the second year in a row. He became the first player in school history to record 60+ assists, blocks and steals in a season. In 52 games, he registered 91 career blocked shots, ranking sixth all-time in New Mexico history. He fell just six points short of 1,000 in his New Mexico career, and for the second year in a row, he was given the Bob King Team MVP Award. He was named the MWC tournament MVP and earned First Team All-Mountain West honors for the second straight year. He was also runner-up to Utah's Andrew Bogut as MWC Player of the Year.

== NBA career ==
=== Indiana Pacers (2005–2014) ===
==== Early years (2005–2007) ====
Granger was selected 17th overall in the 2005 NBA draft by the Indiana Pacers. He was named to the NBA All-Rookie Second Team after averaging 7.5 points and 4.9 rebounds in 78 games. He was a starter in the T-Mobile Rookie Challenge during All-Star Weekend in Houston on February 17, 2006, where he had nine points, three rebounds, two assists and a blocked shot in six minutes, and shot 2-of-4 from 3-point range.

In 2006–07, Granger became one of only four Pacers players to hit 100+ 3-point field goals in a season in the previous 15 years. He led Indiana with 110, after making just 30 3-pointers in his rookie season. He was the only Pacers player to see action in all 82 games; he started 57 games, including the first 14 and 42 of the last 44 games.

==== Perennial team scoring leader (2007–2012) ====
In 2007–08, Granger was the team's leading scorer with an average of 19.6 points per game. On November 5, 2007, he was named Eastern Conference Player of the Week for games played Tuesday, October 30 through Sunday, November 4. It was his first and only NBA Player of the Week honor. He set a franchise record by making 65 straight free throws (January 21 to February 22), breaking the record set by Reggie Miller in 2005.

On October 31, 2008, Granger signed a five-year contract extension with the Pacers believed to be worth a guaranteed $60 million. The new contract began in 2009–10, with incentives that could have pushed the total closer to $65 million.

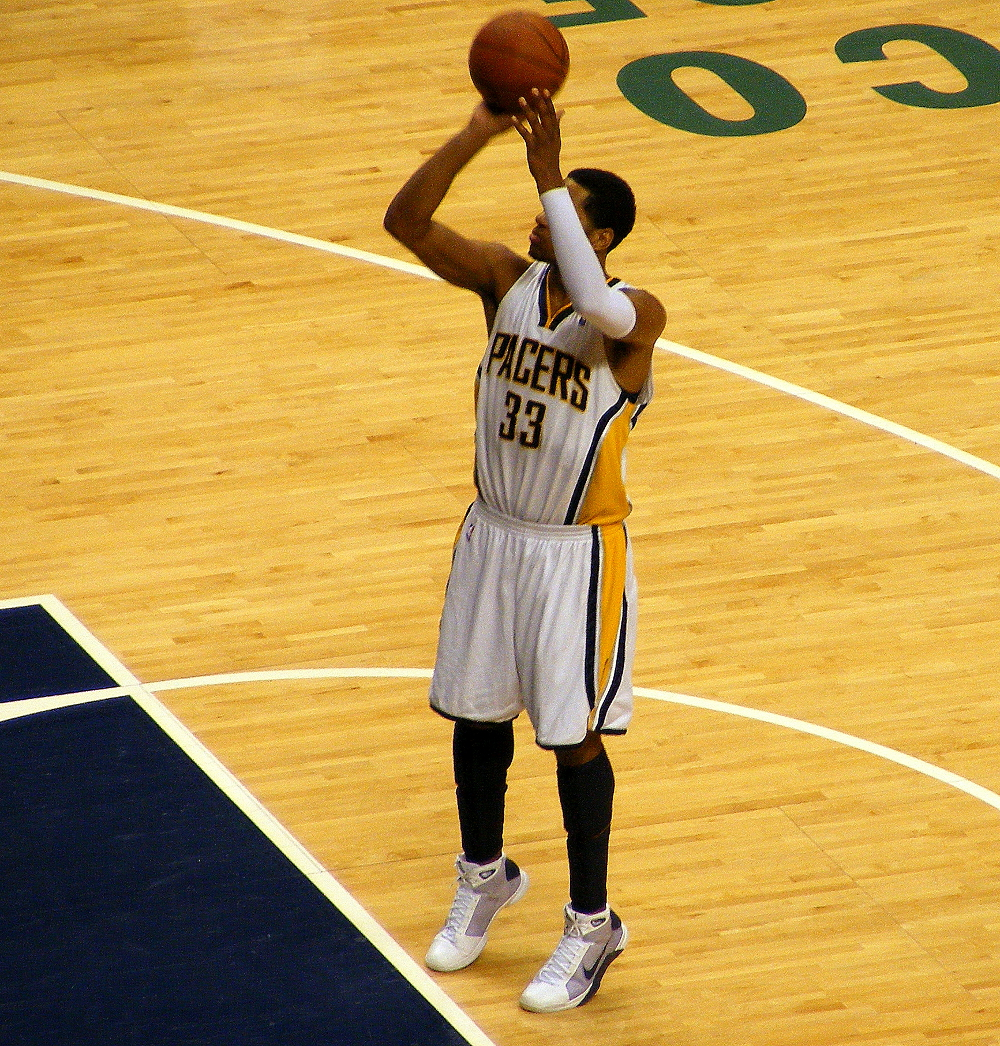
Granger in December 2008, shooting a free throw

In 2008–09, Granger became the first player in NBA history to lift his scoring average at least five points per game in three consecutive seasons, and the first Indiana player to average more than 25 points per game in more than 30 years. He ranked fifth in the NBA with 25.8 points and was named the NBA's Most Improved Player. His average was the highest by an Indiana player since Billy Knight's single-season team record of 26.6 points per game in 1976–77. Granger scored 20 or more points in a career-high 16 straight games from December 15 to January 19, tying the longest streak in the Pacers' NBA history. In a three-game span from January 3 to 7, he scored 35 or more points in each game and is the only Pacers player to ever do so. In February 2009, he played in his first and only NBA All-Star Game. He missed a total of 15 games due to injury or illness, including 11 in February and March with a torn tendon in his right foot.

In 2009–10, Granger led the Pacers with 24.1 points per game, eighth best in the NBA and third best in the Eastern Conference. He scored 20 or more points in 45 of 62 appearances and scored 30+ points 16 times. He tallied a career-high 44 points against the Utah Jazz on March 26, 2010. He missed a total of 18 games due to injury or illness, including 16 straight in December and January with a torn plantar fascia in his right foot.

In the summer of 2010, Granger won gold as a member of the US national team at the 2010 FIBA World Championship.

In 2010–11, Granger was the Pacers' leading scorer for the fourth season in a row, with 20.5 points per game, which was 16th best in the NBA and his third consecutive season of 20+ points per game. He scored in double figures in all but four games and tallied 20 or more points 39 times with 30+ points nine times. On January 2, 2011, he grabbed a career-high 17 rebounds in a 98–92 loss to the New York Knicks.

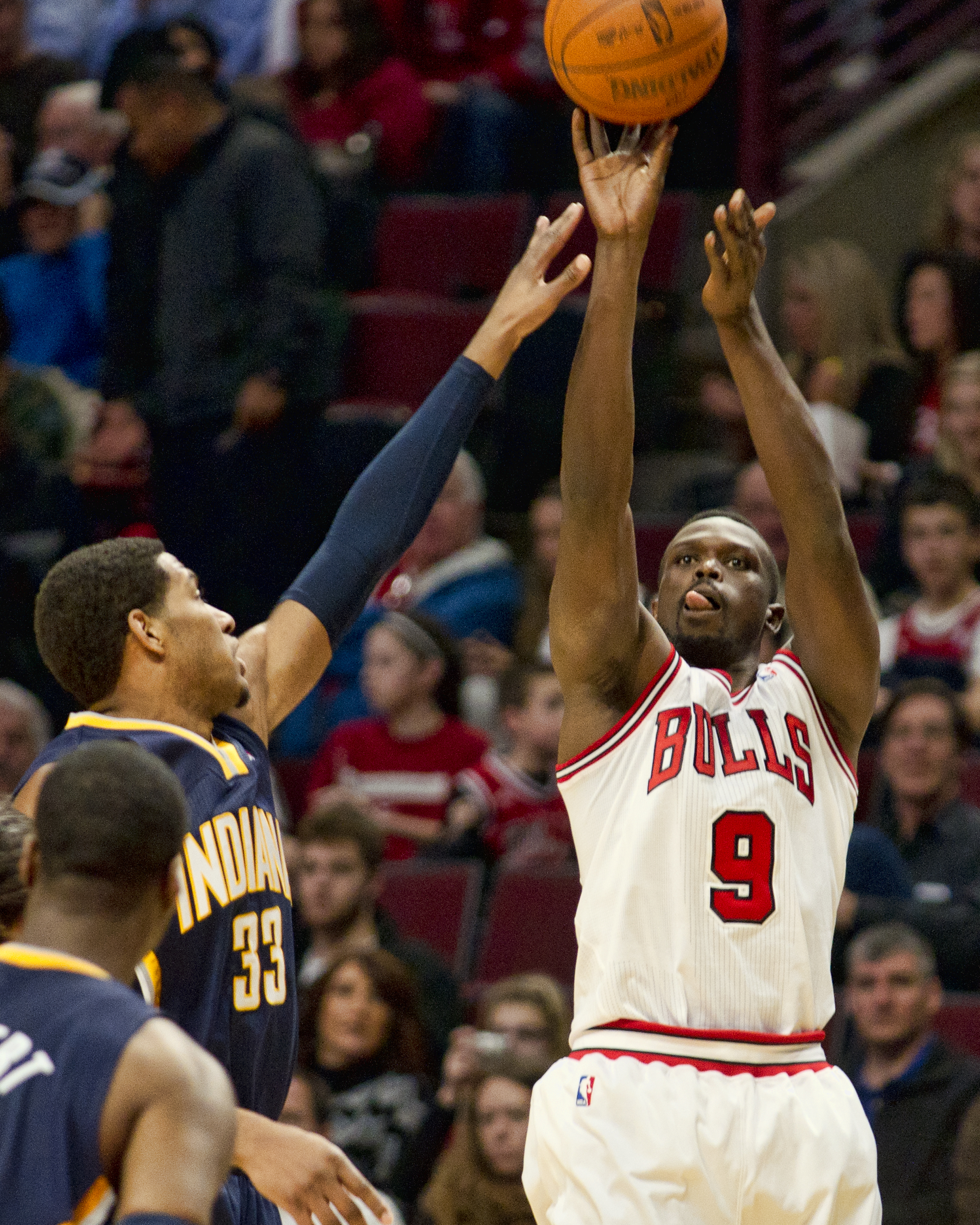
Granger (#33) in December 2011, attempting to block Luol Deng's shot

In the lockout-shortened 2011–12 season, Granger was the Pacers' leading scorer for the fifth consecutive season—his 18.7 points per game ranked 22nd best in the NBA.

==== Injury-riddled end to Pacers tenure (2012–2014) ====
Granger missed the first 55 games of the 2012–13 season with tendinosis of the left knee. He played five games between February 23 and March 3 before being placed back on the inactive list and eventually having surgery on the knee on April 4.

Granger missed the first 25 games of the 2013–14 season with a strained left calf. Indiana fans gave Granger a standing ovation on December 20 when he made his season debut in the first quarter of the Pacers' 114–81 win over the Houston Rockets, and chanted his name when he finally made his first basket, a 3-pointer, early in the fourth. He appeared in 29 games (2 starts) for the Pacers in 2013–14, averaging 8.3 points, 3.6 rebounds and 1.1 assists in 22.5 minutes per game.

=== Los Angeles Clippers (2014) ===
On February 20, 2014, Granger was traded, along with a 2015 second-round pick, to the Philadelphia 76ers in exchange for Evan Turner and Lavoy Allen. He was bought out by the 76ers on February 26, and two days later, he signed with the Los Angeles Clippers for the rest of the season.

=== Miami Heat (2014–2015) ===
On July 14, 2014, Granger signed with the Miami Heat. On February 19, 2015, he was traded to the Phoenix Suns in a three-team trade involving the New Orleans Pelicans. However, due to knee problems, he did not play for the Suns in 2014–15. On July 9, 2015, he was traded to the Detroit Pistons, along with Reggie Bullock and Marcus Morris, in exchange for a 2020 second-round draft pick. He spent the preseason in Arizona rehabbing from knee and foot injuries, and on October 26, 2015, he was waived by the Pistons.

== Career statistics ==
Legend
GP	Games played	GS	Games started	MPG	Minutes per game
FG%	Field goal percentage	3P%	3-point field goal percentage	FT%	Free throw percentage
RPG	Rebounds per game	APG	Assists per game	SPG	Steals per game
BPG	Blocks per game	PPG	Points per game	**Bold**	Career high
*	Led the league

=== NBA ===
==== Regular season ====
Year	Team	GP	GS	MPG	FG%	3P%	FT%	RPG	APG	SPG	BPG	PPG
2005–06	Indiana	78	17	22.6	**.462**	.323	.777	4.9	1.2	.7	.8	7.5
2006–07	Indiana	**82***	57	34.0	.459	.382	.803	4.6	1.4	.8	.7	13.9
2007–08	Indiana	80	**80**	36.0	.446	**.404**	.852	**6.1**	2.1	1.2	1.1	19.6
2008–09	Indiana	67	66	36.2	.447	**.404**	.878	5.1	2.7	1.0	**1.4**	**25.8**
2009–10	Indiana	62	62	**36.7**	.428	.361	.848	5.5	**2.8**	**1.5**	.8	24.1
2010–11	Indiana	79	79	35.0	.425	.386	.848	5.4	2.6	1.1	.8	20.5
2011–12	Indiana	62	62	33.3	.416	.381	.873	5.0	1.8	1.0	.6	18.7
2012–13	Indiana	5	0	14.8	.286	.200	.625	1.8	.6	.4	.2	5.4
2013–14	Indiana	29	2	22.5	.359	.330	**.962**	3.6	1.1	.3	.4	8.3
2013–14	L.A. Clippers	12	0	16.2	.429	.353	.857	2.3	.7	.3	.3	8.0
2014–15	Miami	30	6	20.4	.401	.357	.757	2.7	.6	.4	.2	6.3
Career		586	431	31.5	.434	.380	.848	4.9	1.9	1.0	.8	16.8
All-Star		1	0	11.0	1.000	.000	.000	1.0	.0	2.0	.0	2.0

==== Playoffs ====
Year	Team	GP	GS	MPG	FG%	3P%	FT%	RPG	APG	SPG	BPG	PPG
2006	Indiana	6	3	27.0	**.529**	**.563**	**1.000**	5.2	1.7	.7	**1.2**	8.2
2011	Indiana	5	5	36.6	.478	.348	.875	**5.6**	**3.2**	**1.2**	.2	**21.6**
2012	Indiana	11	**11**	**38.2**	.397	.356	.821	**5.6**	2.5	.5	.4	17.0
2014	L.A. Clippers	**13**	0	10.3	.275	.227	.778	1.5	.2	.5	.1	2.6
Career		35	19	25.7	.417	.358	.842	4.0	1.6	.6	.4	10.8

=== College ===
Year	Team	GP	GS	MPG	FG%	3P%	FT%	RPG	APG	SPG	BPG	PPG
2001–02	Bradley	21	17	24.6	.446	.176	**.790**	7.1	.7	1.3	**2.4**	11.1
2002–03	Bradley	14	13	27.1	.518	.300	.684	7.9	1.1	1.4	1.4	19.2
2003–04	New Mexico	22	22	**32.0**	.491	.333	.760	**9.0**	2.1	1.3	1.4	**19.5**
2004–05	New Mexico	**30**	**30**	30.0	**.524**	**.433**	.755	8.9	**2.4**	**2.1**	2.0	18.8
**Career**		95	82	28.4	.496	.366	.752	8.2	1.6	1.6	1.9	16.7

== Personal life ==
Granger was raised as a member of Jehovah's Witnesses. Granger's younger brother, Scotty, is a musical artist and songwriter. Granger is the great-nephew of the "Queen of Gospel", Mahalia Jackson.

Granger has a wife and three children.

Granger is actively involved in the "Dribble to Stop Diabetes" campaign due to his family's history with diabetes.

On the side, toward the end of his playing career, Granger built up a real estate investment company.

In January 2017, Granger began working as a studio and game analyst for the CBS Sports Network.

In April 2017, Granger was inducted into New Mexico Sports Hall of Fame.

Granger makes a brief cameo appearance credited as an NBA player in the 2018 Netflix sports drama film Amateur.
