= 2010 Richmond Revolution season =

Indoor Football League team season

- Owner: SportsQuest
- Head coach: Steve Criswell
- Home stadium: Arthur Ashe Athletic Center; 2010 Second Avenue; Richmond, VA 99701

Results
- Record: 13-1
- Division place: 1st Atlantic East
- Playoffs: Lost Conference Quarterfinals 24-26 (Raiders)

The 2010 Richmond Revolution season was the team's first season as an indoor football franchise and first in the Indoor Football League (IFL). One of twenty-five teams competing in the IFL for the 2010 season, the Revolution were members of the Atlantic East Division of the United Conference. The team played their home games at Arthur Ashe Athletic Center in Richmond, Virginia.

== Schedule ==
Win Tie Loss Bye

=== Regular season ===
Week	Day	Date	Kickoff	Opponent	Results		Location
Week	Day	Date	Kickoff	Opponent	Final score	Team record	Location
1	Bye						
2	Saturday	March 6	7:05pm	at Bloomington Extreme	W 49-37	1-0	U.S. Cellular Coliseum
3	Saturday	March 13	7:05pm	Chicago Slaughter	W 30-25	2-0	Arthur Ashe Athletic Center
4	Saturday	March 20	7:05pm	Maryland Maniacs	W 23-18	3-0	Arthur Ashe Athletic Center
5	Bye						
6	Saturday	April 3	7:30pm	at Rochester Raiders	L 29-33	3-1	The Dome Arena
7	Saturday	April 10	7:05pm	West Michigan ThunderHawks	W 45-39	4-1	Arthur Ashe Athletic Center
8	Saturday	April 18	2:00pm	at Rochester Raiders	W 40-33	5-1	The Dome Arena
9	Saturday	April 24	7:05pm	Maryland Maniacs	W 54-45	6-1	Arthur Ashe Athletic Center
10	Saturday	May 1	7:00pm	at West Michigan ThunderHawks	W 46-44	7-1	L. C. Walker Arena
11	Saturday	May 8	7:05pm	at Maryland Maniacs	W 55–39	8-1	Cole Field House
12	Saturday	May 15	7:00pm	at West Michigan ThunderHawks	W 61-37	9-1	L. C. Walker Arena
13	Saturday	May 22	7:05pm	Rochester Raiders	W 57-48	10-1	Arthur Ashe Athletic Center
14	Saturday	May 29	1:05pm	Green Bay Blizzard	W 54-44	11-1	Arthur Ashe Athletic Center
15	Saturday	June 5	7:05pm	at Maryland Maniacs	W 74-14	12-1	Cole Field House
16	Saturday	June 12	7:05pm	Rochester Raiders	W 46-33	13-1	Arthur Ashe Athletic Center
17	Bye						

== Standings ==
2010 Atlantic East Division
	W	L	T	PCT	GB	DIV	PF	PA	STK
y-Richmond Revolution	13	1	0	0.929	---	10-1	663	489	W10
x-Rochester Raiders	9	5	0	0.643	4.0	6-5	641	554	L1
West Michigan ThunderHawks	5	9	0	0.357	8.0	4-5	606	728	L4
Maryland Maniacs	1	13	0	0.071	12.0	1-10	370	644	W1

=== Playoffs ===
Round	Day	Date	Kickoff	Opponent	Results		Location
Round	Day	Date	Kickoff	Opponent	Final score	Team record	Location
Conference Quarterfinals	Monday	June 28	7:05pm	Rochester Raiders	L 24-26	---	Arthur Ashe Athletic Center

== Roster ==
2010 Richmond Revolution roster
Quarterback: 7 Rodney Landers; 3 Bryan Randall; Running back: 18 Eugene Holloman; 8 Brandon Isaiah; Wide receiver: 1 Aaron Alexander; 2 Damon Thompson	Offensive linemen: 66 Jerome Dunbar; 55 Brandon Grier; 78 Kynneth Moses; 52 Derek Stoudt; Defensive linemen: 56 Noland Burchette; 90 Jason Holman; 32 Darius Leak; 53 Sherman Logan	Linebacker: 42 Louis Corum; 11 Vince Hall; Defensive back: 22 Stephen Cason; 21 Daninelle Derricott; 6 A. D. Hale; 23 Demarcus James; Kicker: 9 Chris Segaar	Injured Reserve: currently vacant; Exempt List: currently vacant; Practice squad: currently vacant; rookies in italics Roster updated June 26, 2010; 21 Active, 0 Inactive, 0 PS → More rosters
