= 2010 La Crosse Spartans season =

Indoor Football League team season

- Owner: Chris Kokalis
- General manager: Chris Kokalis
- Head coach: Gilbert Brown
- Home stadium: La Crosse Center; 300 Harbor View Plaza; La Crosse, WI 54601

Results
- Record: 3-11
- Division place: 4th Central North
- Playoffs: did not qualify

The 2010 La Crosse Spartans season was the team's first season as a football franchise and first in the Indoor Football League (IFL). One of twenty-five teams competing in the IFL for the 2010 season, the Spartans were members of the Central North Division of the United Conference. The team played their home games at the La Crosse Center in La Crosse, Wisconsin.

== Schedule ==
Win Tie Loss Bye

=== Preseason ===
Week	Day	Date	Kickoff	Opponent	Results		Location
Week	Day	Date	Kickoff	Opponent	Final Score	Team record	Location
1	Friday	January 29	7:30pm	Family Night Scrimmage	---	---	La Crosse Center
2	Sunday	February 21	3:00pm	Green Bay Blizzard	L 11-14	---	La Crosse Center

=== Regular season ===
Week	Day	Date	Kickoff	Opponent	Results		Location
Week	Day	Date	Kickoff	Opponent	Final Score	Team record	Location
1	Friday	February 26	7:05pm	at Wichita Wild	L 20-57	0-1	Hartman Arena
2	Bye						
3	Bye						
4	Friday	March 19	7:10pm	at Green Bay Blizzard	L 12-48	0-2	Resch Center
5	Sunday	March 28	3:05pm	at Sioux Falls Storm	L 13-45	0-3	Sioux Falls Arena
6	Saturday	April 3	7:30pm	Omaha Beef	L 27-37	0-4	La Crosse Center
7	Sunday	April 11	3:00pm	Green Bay Blizzard	L 30-43	0-5	La Crosse Center
8	Sunday	April 18	7:05pm	Sioux City Bandits	L 20-28	0-6	La Crosse Center
9	Friday	April 23	7:30pm	West Michigan ThunderHawks	L 58-65	0-7	La Crosse Center
10	Friday	April 30	7:30pm	Chicago Slaughter	W 35-29	1-7	La Crosse Center
11	Saturday	May 8	7:05pm	at Bloomington Extreme	L 18-54	1-8	U.S. Cellular Coliseum
12	Bye						
13	Friday	May 21	7:30pm	Bloomington Extreme	L 37-40	1-9	La Crosse Center
14	Sunday	May 30	5:05pm	at Alaska Wild	W 1-0 (forfeit)	2-9	Sullivan Arena
15	Saturday	June 5	7:05pm	at Fairbanks Grizzlies	L 36-64	2-10	Carlson Center
16	Saturday	June 12	7:05pm	at Chicago Slaughter	W 27-20	3-10	Sears Centre
17	Saturday	June 19	7:05pm	Bloomington Extreme	L 21-35	3-11	La Crosse Center

== Roster ==
2010 La Crosse Spartans roster
Quarterback: 14 Kewan Dewberry; 8 Buddy Rivera; Running backs: 31 Bryan Jennings; 24 Marques Smith; Wide receivers: 7 Phillip Ditto; 11 Christopher Headd; 83 Antonio Overstreet; 6 Aaron Straiten	Offensive linemen: 56 Juliene Adams; 75 Matt Wakefield; 60 James Washington; Defensive linemen: 75 Greg Brown; 44 Michael Ebanks; 9 Tommy Chavis; 1 Xzavie Jackson; Antonio O'Neil	Linebackers: currently vacant; Defensive backs: 20 Jamil Abdullah; 2 Walner Belleus; 37 George Carpenter; 5 Paul Simpson; 30 Steve Teeples; 21 Darnell Terrell; Kickers: 13 Jared Keating	Injured Reserve: 3 Hakeem Abdullah RB; 36 Richard Chambers DB; Exempt List: currently vacant; Practice squad: currently vacant; rookies in italics Roster updated June 19, 2010; 22 Active, 2 Inactive → More rosters

== Standings ==
2010 Central North Division
	W	L	T	PCT	GB	DIV	PF	PA	STK
y-Green Bay Blizzard	10	4	0	0.714	---	4-3	686	538	W3
x-Bloomington Extreme	9	5	0	0.643	1.0	6-2	497	435	W6
x-Chicago Slaughter	6	8	0	0.429	4.0	3-5	577	543	L3
La Crosse Spartans	3	11	0	0.214	7.0	2-5	355	565	L1
