= 2010 Green Bay Blizzard season =

Indoor Football League team season

- Owner: Titletown Football Group, LLC
- Head coach: Rik Richards
- Home stadium: Resch Center; 1901 South Onedia Street; Green Bay, WI 54304

Results
- Record: 10-4
- Division place: 1st Central North
- Playoffs: Lost Divisional Round 39-46 (Slaughter)

The 2010 Green Bay Blizzard season was the team's eighth season as a football franchise and first in the Indoor Football League. One of twenty-five teams competing in the IFL for the 2010 season, the Blizzard were members of the Central North Division of the United Conference. The team played their home games at the Resch Center in the Green Bay suburb of Ashwaubenon, Wisconsin.

== Schedule ==
Win Tie Loss Bye

=== Regular season ===
Week	Day	Date	Kickoff	Opponent	Results		Location
Week	Day	Date	Kickoff	Opponent	Final score	Team record	Location
1	Bye						
2	Saturday	March 6	7:05pm	at Sioux City Bandits	W 69-61	1-0	Tyson Events Center/Gateway Arena
3	Saturday	March 13	7:05pm	at Bloomington Extreme	L 20-24	1-1	U.S. Cellular Coliseum
4	Friday	March 19	7:10pm	La Crosse Spartans	W 48-12	2-1	Resch Center
5	Friday	March 26	7:05pm	Bloomington Extreme	W 35-21	3-1	Resch Center
6	Saturday	April 3	7:05pm	at Maryland Maniacs	W 46-41	4-1	Cole Field House
7	Sunday	April 11	3:00pm	at La Crosse Spartans	W 43-30	5-1	La Crosse Center
8	Friday	April 17	7:00pm	at West Michigan ThunderHawks	W 72-69	6-1	L. C. Walker Arena
9	Saturday	April 24	7:05pm	Omaha Beef	W 50-49	7-1	Resch Center
10	Bye						
11	Saturday	May 8	7:05pm	Chicago Slaughter	L 43-46	7-2	Resch Center
12	Bye						
13	Saturday	May 22	7:05pm	at Chicago Slaughter	L 47-50	7-3	Sears Centre
14	Saturday	May 29	1:05pm	at Richmond Revolution	L 44-54	7-4	Arthur Ashe Athletic Center
15	Saturday	June 5	3:45pm	Wichita Wild	W 40-38	8-4	Resch Center
16	Saturday	June 12	7:05pm	West Michigan ThunderHawks	W 74-9	9-4	Resch Center
17	Saturday	June 19	7:05pm	Chicago Slaughter	W 55-30	10-4	Resch Center

=== Playoffs ===
Round	Day	Date	Kickoff	Opponent	Results		Location
Round	Day	Date	Kickoff	Opponent	Final score	Team record	Location
Wild Card	Saturday	June 26	7:05pm	Chicago Slaughter	L 39-46	---	Resch Center

== Roster ==
2010 Green Bay Blizzard roster
Quarterback: 12 Willie Copeland; 11 Jake Phillips; Running back: 5 Randy Bell; Wide receiver: 2 Phillip Brock; 1 Scott Burnoski; 15 Daniel Robinson	Offensive linemen: 69 Leroy Auguste; 77 Ryan Cue; 66 Corey Drake; Defensive linemen: 98 James McClinton; 44 Jeremiah Price; 91 Greg Terrell	Linebacker: 50 Adrian McLeod; 33 Maurice Simpkins; Defensive back: 21 Quinton Andrews; 4 Carlton Bailey; 3 B. J. Hill; 7 Brian Todd Walker; Kicker: 19 Tino Amancio	Injured Reserve: currently vacant; Exempt List: currently vacant; Practice squad: 18 Nate Smithson; rookies in italics Roster updated June 26, 2010; 19 Active, 0 Inactive, 1 PS → More rosters

== Standings ==
2010 Central North Division
	W	L	T	PCT	GB	DIV	PF	PA	STK
y-Green Bay Blizzard	10	4	0	0.714	---	4-3	686	538	W3
x-Bloomington Extreme	9	5	0	0.643	1.0	6-2	497	435	W6
x-Chicago Slaughter	6	8	0	0.429	4.0	3-5	577	543	L3
La Crosse Spartans	3	11	0	0.214	7.0	2-5	355	565	L1
