= 2010 West Michigan ThunderHawks season =

Indoor Football League team season

- Owner: Mike Emerson
- General manager: Rob Preston
- Head coach: Terry Foster
- Home stadium: DeltaPlex Arena

Results
- Record: 5-9
- Division place: 3rd Atlantic East
- Playoffs: did not qualify

The 2010 West Michigan ThunderHawks season was the team's fourth season as a football franchise and first in the Indoor Football League (IFL). One of twenty-five teams competing in the IFL for the 2010 season, the ThunderHawks were members of the Atlantic East Division of the United Conference. The team played their home games at DeltaPlex Arena in Grand Rapids, Michigan.

The team was originally going to be coached by Rod Miller, but Miller left the ThunderHawks for a job in Arena Football 1, and Terry Foster was named the interim head coach.

== Schedule ==
Win Tie Loss Bye

=== Regular season ===
Week	Day	Date	Kickoff	Opponent	Results		Location
Week	Day	Date	Kickoff	Opponent	Final score	Team record	Location
1	Friday	February 26	7:00pm	Maryland Maniacs	W 52–36	1-0	DeltaPlex Arena
2	Bye						
3	Bye						
4	Friday	March 19	7:10pm	Rochester Raiders	W 59–55	2-0	DeltaPlex Arena
5	Sunday	March 28	3:00pm	Rochester Raiders	W 57–51	3-0	DeltaPlex Arena
6	Bye						
7	Saturday	April 10	7:05pm	at Richmond Revolution	L 39–45	3-1	Arthur Ashe Athletic Center
8	Friday	April 17	7:00pm	Green Bay Blizzard	L 69–72	3-2	DeltaPlex Arena
9	Friday	April 23	7:30pm	at La Crosse Spartans	W 65–58	4-2	La Crosse Center
10	Saturday	May 1	7:00pm	Richmond Revolution	L 44–46	4-3	DeltaPlex Arena
11	Friday	May 7	7:00pm	at Rochester Raiders	L 40–55	4-4	Dome Arena
12	Saturday	May 15	7:00pm	Richmond Revolution	L 37–61	4-5	DeltaPlex Arena
13	Saturday	May 22	7:00pm	Maryland Maniacs	W 59–33	5-5	DeltaPlex Arena
14	Friday	May 28	7:35pm	at Chicago Slaughter	L 49–83	5-6	Sears Centre
15	Saturday	June 5	7:00pm	at Bloomington Extreme	L 14–34	5-7	U.S. Cellular Coliseum
16	Saturday	June 12	7:05pm	at Green Bay Blizzard	L 9-74	5-8	Resch Center
17	Saturday	June 19	7:00pm	at Maryland Maniacs	L 13–25	5-9	Cole Field House

== Standings ==
2010 Atlantic East Division
	W	L	T	PCT	GB	DIV	PF	PA	STK
y-Richmond Revolution	13	1	0	0.929	---	10-1	663	489	W10
x-Rochester Raiders	9	5	0	0.643	4.0	6-5	641	554	L1
West Michigan ThunderHawks	5	9	0	0.357	8.0	4-5	606	728	L4
Maryland Maniacs	1	13	0	0.071	12.0	1-10	370	644	W1

== Roster ==
2010 West Michigan ThunderHawks roster
Quarterback: 10 Ronald Hardy, Jr.; 3 Brian Pellone; Running back: 4 Robert Height; 4 Galen Stone; Wide receiver: 23 Nathan Fricke; 17 Adrian Perez; 2 Newby Ras	Offensive linemen Defensive linemen: 55 Vernon Burden; 95 Les Hammers; 96 Tony Woods	Linebacker: 34 Ed Loscalzo; Defensive back: 7 Robert Boyer; 19 Dominique Bryson; 5 Eddie Gant; 24 Terrell Higgins; 21 Jaa Valentine; Kicker: 27 David Hendrix	Injured Reserve: currently vacant; Exempt List: currently vacant; Practice squad: currently vacant; rookies in italics Roster updated June 26, 2010; 19 Active, 0 Inactive, 0 PS → More rosters
