= 2010 Chicago Slaughter season =

Professional indoor football franchise

- Owner: Jim McMahon
- Head coach: Steve McMichael
- Home stadium: Sears Centre; 101 South Madison Street; Hoffman Estates, IL 60701

Results
- Record: 6-8
- Division place: 3rd Central North
- Playoffs: Won Wildcard (Blizzard) 49-39; Lost Divisional (Storm) 33-47

The 2010 Chicago Slaughter season was the team's fifth season as a professional indoor football franchise and first in the Indoor Football League (IFL). One of twenty-five teams competing in the IFL for the 2010 season, the Hoffman Estates, Illinois-based Chicago Slaughter were members of the Central North Division of the United Conference.

Under the leadership of owner Jim McMahon, and head coach Steve McMichael, the team played their home games at the Sears Centre in Hoffman Estates, Illinois.

== Schedule ==
Win Tie Loss Bye

=== Regular season ===
Week	Day	Date	Kickoff	Opponent	Results		Location	Attendance
Week	Day	Date	Kickoff	Opponent	Final Score	Team Record	Location	Attendance
1	Saturday	February 27	7:05pm	Rochester Raiders	L 47-49	0-1	Sears Centre	6,944
2	Bye							
3	Saturday	March 13	7:05pm	at Richmond Revolution	L 25-30	0-2	Arthur Ashe Athletic Center	
4	Sunday	March 21	2:05pm	Bloomington Extreme	L 26-27	0-3	Sears Centre	4,562
5	Saturday	March 27	7:05pm	Alaska Wild	W 34-33	1-3	Sears Centre	4,607
6	Bye							
7	Saturday	April 10	7:05pm	at Bloomington Extreme	W 50-43	2-3	U.S. Cellular Coliseum	4,078
8	Bye							
9	Saturday	April 24	7:05pm	Kent Predators	W 71-29	3-3	Sears Centre	5,789
10	Friday	April 30	7:30pm	at La Crosse Spartans	L 29-35	3-4	La Crosse Center	
11	Saturday	May 8	7:05pm	at Green Bay Blizzard	W 46-43	4-4	Resch Center	
12	Friday	May 14	7:05pm	at Bloomington Extreme	L 30-33	4-5	U.S. Cellular Coliseum	4,269
13	Saturday	May 22	7:05pm	Green Bay Blizzard	W 50-47	5-5	Sears Centre	4,910
14	Friday	May 28	7:35pm	West Michigan ThunderHawks	W 83-49	6-5	Sears Centre	3,276
15	Saturday	June 5	7:30pm	at Rochester Raiders	L 36-43	6-6	Dome Arena	
16	Saturday	June 12	7:05pm	La Crosse Spartans	L 20-27	6-7	Sears Centre	4,648
17	Saturday	June 19	7:05pm	at Green Bay Blizzard	L 30-55	6-8	Resch Center	

=== Playoffs ===
Round	Day	Date	Kickoff	Opponent	Results		Location
Round	Day	Date	Kickoff	Opponent	Final Score	Team Record	Location
Wild Card	Saturday	June 26	7:05pm	at Green Bay Blizzard	W 46-39	---	Resch Center
Divisional	Saturday	July 3	7:05pm	at Sioux Falls Storm	L 33-47	---	Sioux Falls Arena

== Roster ==
2010 Chicago Slaughter roster
Quarterbacks: 14 Tavares Woodley; Running backs: 30 Nick Costentino; 34 Jarrett Payton; Wide receivers: 7 Irani DeAraujo; 2 Reggie Gray; 82 Shatone Powers; 4 Rashed Ward	Offensive linemen: 72 Jason Baksas; 77 Anthony Bullock; 74 Rasche Hill; Defensive linemen: 52 Mike Berry; 5 Ron Ellington; 99 Jon Kowalyshen; 64 Malcolm Woolridge	Linebackers: 69 Chris Pisani; 8 Lenny Radtke; Defensive backs: 23 Chris Goffer; 24 Patrick Jackson; 21 Dennison Robinson; 38 Christopher Rodgers; 6 Sam Smith; Kickers: 25 Chris Nendick	Injured Reserve: 57 Kevin Andryzac; Exempt List: currently vacant; Refused to Report: currently vacant; rookies in italics Roster updated July 7, 2012; 22 Active, 0 Inactive → More rosters

== Standings ==
2010 Central North Division
	W	L	T	PCT	GB	DIV	PF	PA	STK
y-Green Bay Blizzard	10	4	0	0.714	---	4-3	686	538	W3
x-Bloomington Extreme	9	5	0	0.643	1.0	6-2	497	435	W6
x-Chicago Slaughter	6	8	0	0.429	4.0	3-5	577	543	L3
La Crosse Spartans	3	11	0	0.214	7.0	2-5	355	565	L1
