= 2010 Rochester Raiders season =

Indoor Football League team season

- Owner: Dave McCarthy
- Home stadium: The Dome Arena; 2695 Henrietta Rd. Henrietta, NY 14467

Results
- Record: 9-5
- Division place: 2nd Atlantic East
- Playoffs: Won Conference Quarterfinals 26-24 (Revolution); Lost Conference Semifinals 33-45 (Wild)

The 2010 Rochester Raiders season was the team's fifth season as a football franchise and second in the Indoor Football League (IFL). One of twenty-five teams competing in the IFL for the 2010 season, the Raiders were members of the Atlantic East Division of the United Conference. The team played their home games at The Dome Arena in Henrietta, New York.

== Schedule ==
Win Tie Loss Bye

=== Regular season ===
Week	Day	Date	Kickoff	Opponent	Results		Location
Week	Day	Date	Kickoff	Opponent	Final Score	Team record	Location
1	Saturday	February 27	7:05pm	at Chicago Slaughter	W 49-47	1-0	Sears Centre
2	Bye						
3	Bye						
4	Friday	March 19	7:05pm	at West Michigan ThunderHawks	L 55-59	1-1	L. C. Walker Arena
5	Sunday	March 28	3:00pm	at West Michigan ThunderHawks	L 51-57	1-2	L. C. Walker Arena
6	Saturday	April 3	7:30pm	Richmond Revolution	W 33-29	2-2	The Dome Arena
7	Sunday	April 11	2:05pm	at Maryland Maniacs	W 52-36	3-2	Cole Field House
8	Saturday	April 18	2:00pm	Richmond Revolution	L 33-40	3-3	The Dome Arena
9	Friday	April 23	7:00pm	Bloomington Extreme	W 56-41	4-3	The Dome Arena
10	Saturday	May 1	7:05pm	at Maryland Maniacs	W 46-39	5-3	Cole Field House
11	Friday	May 7	7:00pm	West Michigan ThunderHawks	W 55–40	6-3	The Dome Arena
12	Saturday	May 15	7:30pm	Maryland Maniacs	W 51-18	7-3	The Dome Arena
13	Saturday	May 22	7:05pm	at Richmond Revolution	L 48-57	7-4	Arthur Ashe Athletic Center
14	Saturday	May 29	7:30pm	Maryland Maniacs	W 36-9	8-4	The Dome Arena
15	Saturday	June 5	7:30pm	Chicago Slaughter	W 43-36	9-4	Marina Auto Stadium
16	Saturday	June 12	7:05pm	at Richmond Revolution	L 7-51	9-5	Arthur Ashe Athletic Center
17	Bye						

== Standings ==
2010 Atlantic East Division
	W	L	T	PCT	GB	DIV	PF	PA	STK
y-Richmond Revolution	13	1	0	0.929	---	10-1	663	489	W10
x-Rochester Raiders	9	5	0	0.643	4.0	6-5	641	554	L1
West Michigan ThunderHawks	5	9	0	0.357	8.0	4-5	606	728	L4
Maryland Maniacs	1	13	0	0.071	12.0	1-10	370	644	W1

=== Playoffs ===
Round	Day	Date	Kickoff	Opponent	Results		Location
Round	Day	Date	Kickoff	Opponent	Final Score	Team record	Location
Conference Quarterfinals	Monday	June 28	7:05pm	at Richmond Revolution	W 26-24	---	Arthur Ashe Athletic Center
Conference Semifinals	Friday	July 2	7:05pm	at Wichita Wild	L 33-45	---	Hartman Arena

== Roster ==
2010 Rochester Raiders roster
Quarterback: 8 Omar Baker; 10 Perry Patterson; Running back: 1 Jamil Porter; Wide receiver: 9 Chris Carter; 6 Kevin Concepcion; 20 Willie Givens	Offensive linemen: 77 Ryan Baker; 51 Mike Kallfelz; 75 Raphael Nguti; Defensive linemen: 5 Dale Buck; 90 Eddie Bynes; 92 Reggie Paramoure; 47 Damon Suggs	Linebacker: 42 Brenton Brady; 14 Jeff Richardson; Defensive back: 23 Raji El-Amin; 18 Tarryl Gano; 21 Chris Johnson; 32 Makis Whitaker; Kicker: 17 Adam Lanctot	Injured Reserve: currently vacant; Exempt List: currently vacant; Practice squad: currently vacant; rookies in italics Roster updated June 26, 2010; 20 Active, 0 Inactive, 0 PS → More rosters
