= 2010 Bloomington Extreme season =

Team's fifth season as a professional indoor football franchise

- Owner: Ed Brady
- Head coach: Kenton Carr
- Home stadium: U.S. Cellular Coliseum; 101 South Madison Street; Bloomington, IL 60701

Results
- Record: 9-5
- Division place: 2nd Central North
- Playoffs: Lost UC Semifinals (Wild) 48-61

The 2010 Bloomington Extreme season was the team's fifth season as a professional indoor football franchise and second in the Indoor Football League (IFL). One of twenty-five teams competing in the IFL for the 2010 season, the Bloomington, Illinois-based Bloomington Extreme were members of the Central North Division of the United Conference.

Under the leadership of owner Ed Brady, and head coach Kenton Carr, the team played their home games at the U.S. Cellular Coliseum in Bloomington, Illinois.

== Schedule ==
Win Tie Loss Bye

=== Regular season ===
Week	Day	Date	Kickoff	Opponent	Results		Location	Attendance
Week	Day	Date	Kickoff	Opponent	Final Score	Team Record	Location	Attendance
1	Bye							
2	Saturday	March 6	7:05pm	at Richmond Revolution	L 37-49	1-0	U.S. Cellular Coliseum	5,769
3	Saturday	March 13	7:05pm	Green Bay Blizzard	W 24-20	1-1	U.S. Cellular Coliseum	4,018
4	Sunday	March 21	2:05pm	at Chicago Slaughter	W 27-26	2-1	Sears Centre	4,562
5	Friday	March 26	7:05pm	at Green Bay Blizzard	L 21-35	2-2	Resch Center	
6	Bye							
7	Saturday	April 10	7:05pm	Chicago Slaughter	L 43-50	2-3	U.S. Cellular Coliseum	4,078
8	Saturday	April 17	7:05pm	Maryland Maniacs	W 32-6	3-3	U.S. Cellular Coliseum	3,501
9	Friday	April 23	7:00pm	at Rochester Raiders	L 41-56	3-4	Dome Arena	
10	Saturday	May 1	7:05pm	at Omaha Beef	L 25-66	3-5	Omaha Civic Auditorium	
11	Saturday	May 8	7:05pm	La Crosse Spartans	W 54-18	4-5	U.S. Cellular Coliseum	3,711
12	Friday	May 14	7:05pm	Chicago Slaughter	W 33-30	5-5	U.S. Cellular Coliseum	4,269
13	Saturday	May 21	7:30pm	at La Crosse Spartans	W 40-37	6-5	La Crosse Center	
14	Bye							
15	Saturday	June 5	7:00pm	West Michigan ThunderHawks	W 34-14	7-5	U.S. Cellular Coliseum	4,323
16	Saturday	June 12	7:05pm	at Maryland Maniacs	W 44-7	8-5	Cole Field House	
17	Saturday	June 19	7:05pm	at La Crosse Spartans	W 35-21	9-5	La Crosse Center	

=== Playoffs ===
Round	Day	Date	Kickoff	Opponent	Results		Location	Attendance
Round	Day	Date	Kickoff	Opponent	Final Score	Team Record	Location	Attendance
Wild Card	Saturday	June 26	7:05pm	at Wichita Wild	L 48-61	---	Hartman Arena	2,413

== Roster ==
2010 Bloomington Extreme roster
Quarterbacks: 7 Luke Drone; 2 Rocky Hinds; Running backs: 15 Bernard Payton; 26 Andre Raymond; Wide receivers: 1 John Cooper; 4 Johnny Gray; 5 Harry Lewis; 88 Charles Sullivan	Offensive linemen: 60 Justin Deal; 66 Jeff Purdy; 72 Jerome Springfield; 55 Prenny Stokes; Defensive linemen: 96 Quince Holman; 33 Calvin Jones; 44 Larry Luster; 97 Jeff Sobol	Linebackers: 9 Joe Bevis; Defensive backs: 20 David Darby; 6 Vincent Joseph; 24 Terrill Mayberry; 25 James Temple; Kickers: 22 Peter Christofilakos	Injured Reserve: currently vacant; Exempt List: currently vacant; Refused to Report: currently vacant; rookies in italics Roster updated June 26, 2010; 22 Active, 0 Inactive → More rosters

== Standings ==
2010 Central North Division
	W	L	T	PCT	GB	DIV	PF	PA	STK
y-Green Bay Blizzard	10	4	0	0.714	---	4-3	686	538	W3
x-Bloomington Extreme	9	5	0	0.643	1.0	6-2	497	435	W6
x-Chicago Slaughter	6	8	0	0.429	4.0	3-5	577	543	L3
La Crosse Spartans	3	11	0	0.214	7.0	2-5	355	565	L1
