= 2010 Maryland Maniacs season =

Indoor Football League team season

- Owner: Messay Hailemariam
- Head coach: Darryl D'Ateno
- Home stadium: Cole Field House; Campus Drive; College Park, MD 20742

Results
- Record: 1-13
- Division place: 4th Atlantic East
- Playoffs: did not qualify

The 2010 Maryland Maniacs season was the team's second season as a football franchise and second in the Indoor Football League (IFL). One of twenty-five teams competing in the IFL for the 2010 season, the Maniacs were members of the Atlantic East Division of the United Conference. The team played their home games at Cole Field House in College Park, Maryland.

== Schedule ==
Win Tie Loss Bye

=== Regular season ===
Week	Day	Date	Kickoff	Opponent	Results		Location
Week	Day	Date	Kickoff	Opponent	Final Score	Team Record	Location
1	Friday	February 26	7:00pm	at West Michigan ThunderHawks	L 36–52	0-1	L. C. Walker Arena
2	Bye						
3	Bye						
4	Saturday	March 20	7:05pm	at Richmond Revolution	L 18–23	0-2	Arthur Ashe Athletic Center
5	Bye						
6	Saturday	April 3	7:05pm	Green Bay Blizzard	L 45–46	0-3	Cole Field House
7	Sunday	April 11	2:05pm	Rochester Raiders	L 36–52	0-4	Cole Field House
8	Friday	April 17	7:05pm	at Bloomington Extreme	L 69–72	0-5	U.S. Cellular Coliseum
9	Saturday	April 24	7:05pm	at Richmond Revolution	L 45–54	0-6	Arthur Ashe Athletic Center
10	Saturday	May 1	7:05pm	Rochester Raiders	L 39–46	0-7	Cole Field House
11	Saturday	May 8	7:05pm	Richmond Revolution	L 39–55	0-8	Cole Field House
12	Saturday	May 15	7:30pm	at Rochester Raiders	L 18–51	0-9	Dome Arena
13	Saturday	May 22	7:00pm	at West Michigan ThunderHawks	L 33–59	0-10	L. C. Walker Arena
14	Saturday	May 29	7:35pm	at Rochester Raiders	L 9-36	0-11	Dome Arena
15	Saturday	June 5	7:05pm	Richmond Revolution	L 14–74	0-12	Cole Field House
16	Saturday	June 12	7:05pm	Bloomington Extreme	L 7-51	0-13	Cole Field House
17	Saturday	June 19	7:00pm	West Michigan ThunderHawks	W 25–13	1-13	Cole Field House

== Standings ==
2010 Atlantic East Division
	W	L	T	PCT	GB	DIV	PF	PA	STK
y-Richmond Revolution	13	1	0	0.929	---	10-1	663	489	W10
x-Rochester Raiders	9	5	0	0.643	4.0	6-5	641	554	L1
West Michigan ThunderHawks	5	9	0	0.357	8.0	4-5	606	728	L4
Maryland Maniacs	1	13	0	0.071	12.0	1-10	370	644	W1

== Roster ==
Maryland Maniacs roster
Quarterbacks: 13 Cameron Dantley; Running backs: 45 RaShad Morgan; Wide receivers: 81 Corey Alberty; 20 Matthew Barbour; 4 Roderick Bryant; 80 Raymond McCarter; 1 Terry Moss	Offensive linemen: 75 Robert Henning; 68 Kobie Howell; 90 Tyree Spinner; 62 Andrae Townsel; Defensive linemen: 93 Reggie Dorsainvil; 91 Brandon Jones; 52 Durrand Roundtree	Linebackers: 11 Christopher Ndubyeze; Defensive backs: 2 Atcheson Conway; 14 Gus Macfoy; 6 Paul Mulbah; 21 Colin Nelson; 3 Christian Varner; 8 Deyon Williams; Kickers: 14 Justin Willis	Injured Reserve: 4 Jason Goode RB (IR); 17 Derrick McBryde; 13 Dwayne Smith; 4 Bryson Spinner QB (IR); 81 Durell Wooten; Exempt List: currently vacant; Practice squad: currently vacant; rookies in italics; Roster updated June 19, 2010; 22 Active, 5 Inactive, 0 PS; → More rosters
