= Vince Hall =

American football player (born 1984)

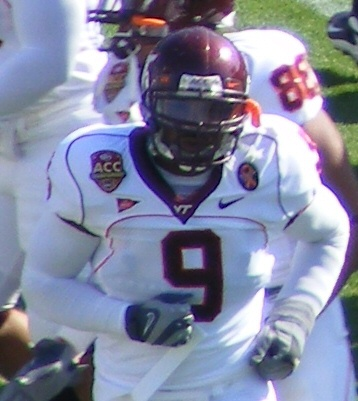
- Hall with Virginia Tech in 2007

No. 11
- Position: Linebacker

Personal information
- Born: December 3, 1984 (age 41); Kingsville, Texas, U.S.
- Listed height: 5 ft 11 in (1.80 m)
- Listed weight: 238 lb (108 kg)

Career information
- College: Virginia Tech
- NFL draft: 2008: undrafted

Career history
- St. Louis Rams (2008)*; Buffalo Bills (2008–2009)*; Richmond Raiders (2010); Richmond Revolution (2010); Richmond Raiders (2011)
- * Offseason or practice squad member only

Awards and highlights
- First-team All-ACC (2006); Second-team All-ACC (2005); Dudley Award (2006)

Vincent Larry Hall (born December 3, 1984) is an American former football linebacker. He was signed by the St. Louis Rams as an undrafted free agent in 2008. He played college football at Virginia Tech. Hall was also a member of the Buffalo Bills, Richmond Raiders and Richmond Revolution.

== Early life ==
He played high school football at Western Branch High School in Chesapeake, Virginia where he lettered four seasons as a linebacker and was named an All-American by both SuperPrep and PrepStar as a linebacker following his senior season. That year, he recorded over 120 tackles, 23 tackles for loss and 10 sacks and also had three interceptions. Also was a 2002 AAA First-team All-State selection. He earned first-team All-Southeastern District honors as a sophomore, junior and senior. Additionally, he was a First-team All-State as a junior.

== College career ==
In 2007, Hall played in 10 games and had 100 tackles, with 6.5 going for a loss and 3.5 sacks and one interception. In 2006, he made 128 tackles, 10.5 tackles for loss, eight quarterback hurries, two sacks, two forced fumbles, a fumble recovery and a pass broken up. In 2005, he had 43 solo and 69 assisted tackles and included in those 112 stops were 8.5 TFL, three sacks, two interceptions, eight passes broken up and 15 QB hurries. In 2004, he played in all 13 games, starting the last 12 and recorded 21 solo stops and 43 assists with 4.5 tackles for loss and a sack, a forced fumble, three pass breakups and seven quarterback hurries. In 2003, he redshirted. He was elected to the Virginia Tech Sports Hall of Fame in 2022.

=== Accolades ===
1st Team All-ACC Player 2006

Dudley Award for best player in the Commonwealth of Virginia 2006

Ranked the 5th best Virginia Tech Player of the Decade by Techsideline.com

== Professional career ==
=== Pre-draft ===
Hall 5-11¼ and weighed 238 and was timed at 4.89 in the 40-yard dash, a 340-pound bench press and a 14 Wonderlic score.

=== Buffalo Bills ===
Hall was added to the Bills practice squad on December 9, 2008, after being released by St. Louis on September 9, 2008. Originally entered the NFL as an undrafted rookie free agent with the Rams on May 6, 2008. He was released by the Bills on May 12, 2009.

=== Richmond Raiders ===
Hall was signed by the Indoor Football League's Richmond Revolution on March 25, 2010, joining fellow former Hokies Bryan Randall, Noland Burchette, Lawrence Lewis, and Chris Segaar.
