= La Crosse Spartans =

Logo

General information
- Founded: 2009
- Folded: 2011
- Headquartered: La Crosse Center in La Crosse, Wisconsin
- Colors: Green, black, white
- LaCrosseSpartans.com

Personnel
- Owner: Chris Kokalis
- Head coach: Kyle Moore-Brown
- President: Chris Kokalis

Team history
- La Crosse Spartans (2010–2011)

Home fields
- La Crosse Center (2010–2011)

League / conference affiliations
- Indoor Football League (2010–2011): United Conference (2010–2011); Central North Division (2010); Great Lakes Division (2011)

The La Crosse Spartans were a professional indoor football team based in La Crosse, Wisconsin. They were a member of the Great Lakes Division, of the United Conference of the Indoor Football League (IFL). They played their home games at the La Crosse Center in La Crosse, Wisconsin.

The team was founded in 2009, and was originally coached by former NFL player Gilbert Brown. They were also coached by his brother Kyle Moore-Brown.

== History ==
On August 6, 2009, Chris Kokalis announced his intentions to start an IFL team in La Crosse for the 2010 season. Former NFL player Gilbert Brown was announced as the head coach. On August 27, the Spartans were conditionally approved as members of the IFL. Such condition is that the Spartans negotiate a successful arena lease. On September 30, the Spartans got the formal go-ahead to play at the center. The Spartans were the third indoor football team to call the La Crosse Center home, following the La Crosse River Rats and the La Crosse Night Train.

=== 2010 season ===
The inaugural season for the La Crosse Spartans was a difficult one. The schedule had the Spartans start the season with 3 tough road games against some of the best teams in the IFL. They lost at both Wichita and Sioux Falls, who eventually played against each other for the United Conference finals. Just before halftime of the very first game the Spartans would lose their starting Quarterback to a knee injury, beginning a season where they would go through multiple Quarterbacks and Kickers, trying to find the right fit for the team. They finished the first half of the season 0-7. The Spartans earned their first victory against the Chicago Slaughter on April 30 in La Crosse. Their first road victory against at Chicago on June 12 . They finished the season 3-11.

=== 2011 season ===
The second season of the La Crosse Spartans began February 19, 2011, in the IFL’s showcase game, the Kickoff Classic. La Crosse played seven regular season games at home over the course of February through early June. Indoor football veteran Jose Jefferson joined the Spartans for the 2011 season as their Offensive Coordinator.

After four games of the 2011 season it was announced that head coach Gilbert Brown would be taking a leave of absence from the team for personal reasons, and that his brother Kyle Moore-Brown would be switching from assistant coach to head coach of the Spartans.

On April 30, 2011 the Spartans became one of the few teams in indoor football history to post a shutout, beating the Lehigh Valley Steelhawks 51-0.

On August 30, 2011, GM and co-owner Chris Kokalis announced the formation of the Cedar Rapids Titans, including former Spartans members Xzavie Jackson, Travis Miller and Mike Polaski. The Titans were listed as members of the Great Lakes division, along with the Green Bay Blizzard, Bloomington Extreme and Chicago Slaughter. The Spartans were not listed in this division. Kokalis said the Spartans franchise will "cease to exist", but also said that the team was up for sale.

== Season-by-season results ==
League champions	Conference champions	Division champions	Wild card berth	League leader

Season	Team	League	Conference	Division	Regular season				Postseason results
Season	Team	League	Conference	Division	Finish	Wins	Losses	Ties	Postseason results
2010	2010	IFL	United	Central North	4th	3	11	0	
2011	2011	IFL	United	Great Lakes	4th	5	9	0	
Totals						8	20	0	All-time regular season record (2010–2011)
Totals						0	0	-	All-time postseason record (2010–2011)
Totals						8	20	0	All-time regular season and postseason record (2010–2011)

== Attendance statistics ==
Season-by-season average attendance

Year	Average attendance
2010	2574
2011	2280

== Vs opponent ==
Opponent	OVERALL	HOME	AWAY	PLYFF
Alaska Wild	(1-0)	(0-0)	(1-0)	(0-0)
Bloomington Extreme	(0-5)	(0-3)	(0-2)	(0-0)
Chicago Slaughter	(2-2)	(1-1)	(1-1)	(0-0)
Fairbanks Grizzlies	(0-1)	(0-0)	(0-1)	(0-0)
Green Bay Blizzard	(0-4)	(0-2)	(0-2)	(0-0)
Kent Predators	(1-0)	(1-0)	(0-0)	(0-0)
Lehigh Valley Steelhawks	(2-0)	(2-0)	(0-0)	(0-0)
Nebraska Danger	(1-0)	(1-0)	(0-0)	(0-0)
Omaha Beef	(0-2)	(0-1)	(0-1)	(0-0)
Richmond Revolution	(1-1)	(0-0)	(1-1)	(0-0)
Sioux City Bandits	(0-1)	(0-1)	(0-0)	(0-0)
Sioux Falls Storm	(0-2)	(0-0)	(0-2)	(0-0)
West Michigan ThunderHawks	(0-1)	(0-1)	(0-0)	(0-0)
Wichita Wild	(0-1)	(0-0)	(0-1)	(0-0)

== Notable players ==
See Category:La Crosse Spartans players

== Year-by-year leaders ==
Passing (Yards/Touchdowns/Completions)

Year	Player	Att	Comp	Pct	Yds	TD	Int	QB RTG	GP
2010	Buddy Rivera	152	85	56%	856	6	8	63.4	7
2011	Buddy Rivera	180	96	53%	978	22	12	81.0	13

Rushing (Yards/Attempts)

Year	Player	Att	Yds	Avg	Lng	TD	GP
2010	Mark Bonds	92	337	3.7	31	12	8
2011	LaRon Council	177	640	3.6	34	13	14

Rushing (Touchdowns)

Year	Player	Att	Yds	Avg	Lng	TD	GP
2010	Buddy Rivera	84	286	3.4	26	13	7
2011	LaRon Council	177	640	3.6	34	13	14

Receiving (Yards/Touchdowns)

Year	Player	Rec	Yds	Avg	Lng	TD	GP
2010	Antonio Overstreet	29	437	15.1	44	6	12
2011	Christopher Headd	33	360	10.9	40	7	13

Receiving (Receptions)

Year	Player	Rec	Yds	Avg	Lng	TD	GP
2010	Aaron Straiten	36	238	6.6	40	1	7
2011	Christopher Headd	33	360	10.9	40	7	13

All Purpose (Yards)

Year	Player	Yds	TD	GP
2010	Antonio Overstreet	1007	9	12
2011	LaRon Council	1067	18	14

All Purpose (Touchdowns)

Year	Player	Yds	TD	GP
2010	Buddy Rivera	286	13	7
2011	LaRon Council	1067	18	14

Returns (Yards/Returns)

Year	Player	Ret	Yds	Avg	Lng	TD	GP
2010	Antonio Overstreet	30	497	16.6	50	1	12
2011	Kevis Buckley	37	588	15.9	48	1	14

Returns (Touchdowns)

Year	Player	Ret	Yds	Avg	Lng	TD	GP
2010	Antonio Overstreet	30	497	16.6	50	1	12
2011*	Kevis Buckley	37	588	15.9	48	1	14
2011*	LaRon Council	13	207	15.9	56	1	14

Kicking (FG Percent) (minimum 10 attempts)

Year	Player	FGM	FGA	FG%	Lng	GP
2010	Jared Keating	3	10	30%	44	4
2011	Rubio Radamez	3	11	27%	47	3

Kicking (EP Percent) (minimum 10 attempts)

Year	Player	EPM	EPA	EP%	GP
2010	Jared Keating	11	13	85%	4
2011	Mike Polaski	32	49	65%	12

Tackles

Year	Player	Tac	Solo	Ast	GP
2010	Walner Belleus	69	46	23	13
2011	Joe Bevis	74	36	38	12

Sacks

Year	Player	Sac	GP
2010	Xzavie Jackson	5.5	13
2011	Xzavie Jackson	12.5	14

Interceptions

Year	Player	Int	TD	GP
2010	Darnell Terrell	7	0	12
2011	Jamil Abdullah	9	0	12

== Awards and honors ==
2011

- First Team All-IFL Defense (DL) - Xzavie Jackson
- Week 4 Defensive Player of the Week - Xzavie Jackson
- Week 10 Defensive Player of the Week - La Crosse Spartans Defense

2010

- IFL Community Relations Award - La Crosse Spartans
- First Team All-IFL Defense (DB) - Darnell Terrell
- Week 9 Offensive Player of the Week - Mark Bonds
- Week 16 Defensive Player of the Week - Darnell Terrell

== See also ==
- La Crosse River Rats
- La Crosse Night Train
