= U.S. Cellular Center =

U.S. Cellular Center may refer to two arenas in the United States:

- U.S. Cellular Center (Asheville), North Carolina, now Harrah's Cherokee Center
- U.S. Cellular Center (Cedar Rapids), Iowa, now Alliant Energy PowerHouse

== See also ==
- U.S. Cellular Coliseum, Bloomington, Illinois, now Grossinger Motors Arena
