= 2010 Omaha Beef season =

Indoor Football League team season

- Owner: Jeff Sprowls Omaha Civic Auditorium; 1804 Capitol Avenue; Omaha, NE 68102
- Head coach: Bruce Cowdrey

Results
- Record: 9-5
- Division place: 3rd Central West
- Playoffs: Lost United Conference Quarterfinals 23-42 (Storm)

The 2010 Omaha Beef season was the team's eleventh season as a football franchise and second in the Indoor Football League (IFL). One of twenty-five teams competing in the IFL for the 2010 season, the Beef were members of the Central West Division of the United Conference. The team played their home games at the Omaha Civic Auditorium in Sioux Falls, South Dakota.

== Schedule ==
Win Tie Loss Bye

=== Regular season ===
Week	Day	Date	Kickoff	Opponent	Results		Location	Attendance
Week	Day	Date	Kickoff	Opponent	Final score	Team record	Location	Attendance
1	Bye							
2	Saturday	March 6	7:05pm	Sioux Falls Storm	L 47-54	0-1	Omaha Civic Auditorium	3,091
3	Saturday	March 13	7:05pm	Sioux City Bandits	W 53-26	1-1	Omaha Civic Auditorium	3,790
4	Bye							
5	Monday	March 29	7:05pm	Wichita Wild	L 47-57	1-2	Omaha Civic Auditorium	3,719
6	Saturday	April 3	7:30pm	at La Crosse Spartans	W 37-27	2-2	La Crosse Center	NA
7	Saturday	April 10	3:45pm	at Wichita Wild	L 50-56	2-3	Hartman Arena	3,325
8	Bye							
9	Saturday	April 24	7:05pm	at Green Bay Blizzard	L 49-50	2-4	Resch Center	NA
10	Saturday	May 1	7:05pm	Bloomington Extreme	W 66-25	3-4	Omaha Civic Auditorium	NA
11	Saturday	May 8	7:05pm	at Arkansas Diamonds	W 71-33	4-4	Verizon Arena	NA
12	Saturday	May 15	7:05pm	at Sioux Falls Storm	W 43-37	5-4	Sioux Falls Arena	4,329
13	Saturday	May 22	7:05pm	Sioux City Bandits	W 67-48	6-4	Omaha Civic Auditorium	1,800
14	Saturday	May 29	7:05pm	at Sioux Falls Storm	L 56-57	6-5	Sioux Falls Arena	
15	Saturday	June 5	7:00pm	at Sioux City Bandits	W 64–29	7-5	Tyson Events Center	4,311
16	Saturday	June 12	7:05pm	Colorado Ice	W 39-27	8–5	Omaha Civic Auditorium	2,623
17	Saturday	June 19	7:05pm	Wichita Wild	W 48-31	9-5	Omaha Civic Auditorium	2,148

=== Standings ===
2010 Central West Division
	W	L	T	PCT	GB	DIV	PF	PA	STK
y-Sioux Falls Storm	11	3	0	0.786	---	9-2	665	524	W1
x-Wichita Wild	9	5	0	0.643	2.0	7-4	639	522	L1
x-Omaha Beef	9	5	0	0.643	2.0	6-4	497	435	W2
Sioux City Bandits	4	10	0	0.286	7.0	3-9	539	726	L6
Colorado Ice	2	12	0	0.143	9.0	1-7	531	684	L3

=== Playoffs ===
Round	Day	Date	Kickoff	Opponent	Results		Location
Round	Day	Date	Kickoff	Opponent	Final score	Team record	Location
UC Quarterfinals	Saturday	June 26	7:05pm	at Sioux Falls Storm	L 23-42	---	Sioux Falls Arena

== Roster ==
2010 Omaha Beef roster
Quarterbacks: 6 James McNear; 8 Ben Sankey; Running backs: 32 R. J. Rollins; Wide receivers: 1 Maurice Avery; 3 Mike Jones; 7 Luke McArdle; 5 O. J. Simpson	Offensive linemen: 65 George Batiste; 72 Joel Klinger; 68 Jabari Levy; 54 James Poynter; Defensive linemen: 92 Ramon Richardson; 18 John Scott; -- Byron Wilson	Linebackers: 13 Cornelius Brown; 19 Matt Hewitt; Defensive backs: 24 Diezeas Calbert; 2 Cortney Grixby; 20 Brent Hafford; 10 Michael Phillips; 21 Patrick Wells; Kickers: 85 Shane Longest	Injured Reserve: 99 Devonte Peterson DL; Exempt List: currently vacant; Roster updated June 26, 2010; 22 Active, 1 Inactive → More rosters
