= 2010 Sioux City Bandits season =

Indoor Football League team season

- Owner: Bob Scott
- General manager: Bob Scott
- Head coach: Tommie Williams (weeks 1–15); Jarrod DeGeorgia/Erv Strohbeen (interim, weeks 16–17)
- Home stadium: Tyson Events Center; 401 Gordon Drive; Sioux City, Iowa 51101

Results
- Record: 4-10
- Division place: 4th Central West
- Playoffs: did not qualify

The 2010 Sioux City Bandits season was the team's tenth as the Sioux City Bandits, eleventh overall and second as a member of Indoor Football League (IFL). One of twenty-five teams competing in the IFL for the 2010 season, the Sioux City, Iowa-based Bandits were members of the Central West Division of the United Conference.

The Bandits played their home games at the Tyson Events Center in Sioux City, Iowa, under the direction of head coach Tommie Williams, until he resigned on June 10, 2010. Jarrod DeGeorgia and Erv Strohbeen were named interim head coaches for the final two games.

== Schedule ==
Key: Win Loss Bye

=== Regular season ===
All start times are local time

Week	Day	Date	Kickoff	Opponent	Results		Location	Attendance
Week	Day	Date	Kickoff	Opponent	Score	Record	Location	Attendance
1	Saturday	February 27	7:05pm	at Colorado Ice	W 48-38	1-0	Budweiser Events Center	N/A
2	Saturday	March 6	7:05pm	Green Bay Blizzard	L 61-69	1-1	Tyson Events Center	3,102
3	Saturday	March 13	7:05pm	at Omaha Beef	L 26-53	1-2	Omaha Civic Auditorium	3,790
4	BYE							
5	Saturday	March 27	7:10pm	Colorado Ice	W 55-28	2-2	Tyson Events Center	2,991
6	BYE							
7	Saturday	April 10	7:05pm	Sioux Falls Storm	L 23-57	2-3	Tyson Events Center	4,431
8	Sunday	April 18	7:05pm	at La Crosse Spartans	W 28-20	3-3	La Crosse Center	N/A
9	BYE							
10	Saturday	May 1	7:05pm	Wichita Wild	W 48-47	4-3	Tyson Events Center	3,186
11	Saturday	May 8	7:05pm	Sioux Falls Storm	L 38-43	4-4	Tyson Events Center	2,064
12	Saturday	May 15	7:05pm	Wichita Wild	L 44-53	4-5	Tyson Events Center	2,529
13	Saturday	May 22	7:05pm	at Omaha Beef	L 46-67	4-6	Omaha Civic Auditorium	1,800
14	Saturday	May 29	7:00pm	at Colorado Ice	L 38-42	4-7	Budweiser Events Center	2,536
15	Saturday	June 5	7:05pm	Omaha Beef	L 29-64	4-8	Tyson Events Center	4,311
16	Saturday	June 12	7:05pm	at Wichita Wild	L 17-67	4-9	Hartman Arena	3,103
17	Saturday	June 19	7:05pm	at Sioux Falls Storm	L 36-78	4-10	Sioux Falls Arena	N/A

== Standings ==
2010 Central West Division
	W	L	T	PCT	GB	DIV	PF	PA	STK
y-Sioux Falls Storm	11	3	0	0.786	---	9-2	665	524	W1
x-Wichita Wild	9	5	0	0.643	2.0	7-4	639	522	L1
x-Omaha Beef	9	5	0	0.643	2.0	6-4	497	435	W2
Sioux City Bandits	4	10	0	0.286	7.0	3-9	539	726	L6
Colorado Ice	2	12	0	0.143	9.0	1-7	531	684	L3

== Roster ==
2010 Sioux City Bandits roster
Quarterbacks: 8 Scott Jensen; 9 Donovan Porterie; Running backs: 5 Anthony Jones; Wide receivers: 2 Leon Hall; 3 Tra Johnson; 10 Damon Mothershead; 14 T. J. Williams	Offensive linemen: 74 Jordan Picou; 64 Pat Elvis So'oalo; 70 Randall Swoops; 57 James Thompson; 60 Sam Weaver; Defensive linemen: 96 Idress Abdur-Rashied; 7 Sean Kelly; 94 Joseph Wims	Linebackers: 51 Spetlar Tonga; Defensive backs: 1 Alex Ardley; 20 Jason Beach; 18 Chris Singleton; Special teams: 12 Shane Hudnall	Reserve lists: Currently vacant; Rookies in italics Roster updated June 19, 2010; 20 Active, 0 Inactive → More rosters
