= Roc City Roller Derby =

Roller derby league

- Metro area: Rochester, NY
- Country: United States
- Founded: 2008
- Teams: Roc Stars (A team); B-Sides (B team)
- Track type: Flat
- Venue: The Dome Center
- Affiliations: WFTDA
- Org. type: 501c(3) nonprofit corporation
- Website: www.rocderby.com

Roc City Roller Derby (RCRD) is a roller derby league based in Rochester, New York. Founded in 2008, it has three league or home teams, and two travel teams which compete against teams from other leagues. The league primarily plays at The Dome Center, with occasional games at Rochester Institute of Technology and at local roller rinks. In January 2013 it was announced that the league would begin playing at the Sports Centre at MCC starting in April 2013.

The league was founded in February 2008 by a group of women including Kate Atronic, known as "Resident Eva", who had previously skated with the Queen City Roller Girls, and held its first bout in May 2009.

Roc City was accepted into the Women's Flat Track Derby Association Apprentice Program in January 2011, and became a full member of the WFTDA in September. By the end of the year, it was already 17th in the East Region.

== Rankings ==
| Season | Q4 ranking | Playoffs | Championship |
|---|---|---|---|
| 2011 | 17 | DNQ | DNQ |
| 2012 | 20 | DNQ | DNQ |
