= Phillip Brock =

American gridiron football player (born 1982)

No. 10, 2
- Position: Wide receiver/running back

Personal information
- Born: January 17, 1982 (age 44); New Orleans, Louisiana, U.S.
- Listed height: 6 ft 0 in (1.83 m)
- Listed weight: 212 lb (96 kg)

Career information
- High school: New Orleans (LA) Brother Martin
- College: Nicholls State
- NFL draft: 2006: undrafted

Career history
- CenTex Barracudas (2006); Tucson Blaze (2006); Edmonton Eskimos (2007)*; Peoria Pirates (2008); Green Bay Blizzard (2009–2010); Toronto Argonauts (2009)*; Iowa Barnstormers (2010)
- * Offseason or practice squad member only

Career AFL statistics
- Tackles: 1
- Stats at ArenaFan.com

Phillip Brock (born January 17, 1982) is a former Arena football wide receiver and running back. He was signed by the CenTex Barracudas as an undrafted free agent in 2006. He played college football at Nicholls State University.

Brock was also a member of the Tucson Blaze, Edmonton Eskimos, Peoria Pirates and Toronto Argonauts.
