= Maurice Simpkins =

American football player and coach (born 1983)

No. 33, 54
- Position: Linebacker

Personal information
- Born: April 29, 1983 (age 43); Batesburg-Leesville, South Carolina, U.S.
- Listed height: 6 ft 1 in (1.85 m)
- Listed weight: 240 lb (109 kg)

Career information
- High school: Batesburg-Leesville (SC)
- College: Coastal Carolina
- NFL draft: 2005: undrafted

Career history

Playing
- Rock River Raptors (2007–2008); Green Bay Blizzard (2010); Green Bay Packers (2010); St. Louis Rams (2010–2011)*; Nebraska Danger (2013)
- * Offseason or practice squad member only

Coaching
- Atlanta Sharks (Defensive coordinator) (2015)

Awards and highlights
- 3× All-Big South LB; IFL Most Improved Player (2010); First Team All-IFL (2010); Second Team All-IFL (2013)
- Stats at Pro Football Reference

Andrew Maurice Simpkins (born April 29, 1983) is an American technology consultant and a former professional football linebacker. Simpkins played college football at Catawba College but followed Catawba head coach David Bennett to Coastal Carolina University to finish his college career. He was one of Coastal Carolina's first-ever First-team All-Big South players.

== Professional career ==
=== Green Bay Blizzard ===
He was signed in 2010 by the Green Bay Blizzard of the Indoor Football League. Simpkins made a big impact on the team in the first year earning him the honors of the IFL 2010 Most Improved Player award.

=== Green Bay Packers ===
On August 10, 2010, the Green Bay Packers signed Simpkins as an undrafted free agent. Simpkins was signed to the practice squad to start the 2010 season but on October 7, 2010, Simpkins was moved to the Green Bay Packers 53-man active roster. Simpkins was released from the Green Bay Packers on October 26, 2010, after appearing in two games.

=== St. Louis Rams ===
On December 7, 2010, Simpkins was signed to the St. Louis Rams practice squad. He was waived on August 3, 2011.

=== Nebraska Danger ===
Simpkins signed with the Nebraska Danger of the Indoor Football League for the 2013 season. He was released on June 5, 2013.

== Personal life ==
After retiring from professional football, Simpkins started a tech consulting firm. Student Application Fraudulent Examination runs a platform for colleges to screen for fraudulent student applications, particularly student loans.

== Statistics ==
			Tackles				Interceptions				Fumbles	
Season	Team	GP	TOT	SOL	AST	SAC	INT	Yrd	PBU	TD	FF	FR
2007	Rock River Raptors	16	116	88	56	5.0	4	30	-	1	-	2
2010	Green Bay Blizzard	14	126	85	41	5.0	5	93	5	2	0	0
2011	Green Bay Packers	2	–	–	–	–	–	–	–	–	–	–
2013	Nebraska Danger	10	97	44	53	1.5	2	5	3	2	0	0
