= 2010 Wichita Wild season =

Indoor Football League team season

- Owner: Wink Hartman
- Head coach: Ken Matous
- Home stadium: Hartman Arena; 8151 N. Hartman Arena Drive; Park City, KS 67147

Results
- Record: 9-5
- Division place: 2nd Central West
- Playoffs: Won United Conference Quarterfinals 42-23 (Beef); Won United Conference Semifinals 47-33 (Slaughter); Lost United Conference Championship 34-52 (Storm)

The 2010 Wichita Wild season was the team's fourth season as a football franchise and second in the Indoor Football League (IFL). One of twenty-five teams competing in the IFL for the 2010 season, the Storm were members of the Great Plains Division of the United Conference. The team played their home games at the Sioux Falls Arena in Sioux Falls, South Dakota.

== Schedule ==
Win Tie Loss Bye

=== Regular season ===
Week	Day	Date	Kickoff	Opponent	Results		Location	Attendance
Week	Day	Date	Kickoff	Opponent	Final Score	Team Record	Location	Attendance
1	Friday	February 26	7:05pm	La Crosse Spartans	W 57-20	1-0	Hartman Arena	4,755
2	Bye							
3	Saturday	March 13	7:05pm	Sioux Falls Storm	L 34-43	1-1	Hartman Arena	3,410
4	Saturday	March 20	7:05pm	Colorado Ice	W 54-40	2-1	Hartman Arena	2,634
5	Monday	March 29	7:05pm	at Omaha Beef	W 57-47	3-1	Omaha Civic Auditorium	3,719
6	Saturday	April 3	7:05pm	at Sioux Falls Storm	W 44-26	4-1	Sioux Falls Arena	3,478
7	Friday	April 10	3:45pm	Omaha Beef	W 56-50	5-1	Hartman Arena	3,325
8	Saturday	April 17	7:05pm	Sioux Falls Storm	L 27-34	5-2	Hartman Arena	3,696
9	Bye							
10	Saturday	May 1	7:05pm	at Sioux City Bandits	L 47-48	5-3	Tyson Events Center	3,186
11	Saturday	May 8	7:00pm	at Colorado Ice	W 32-30	6-3	Budweiser Events Center	NA
12	Saturday	May 15	7:05pm	At Sioux City Bandits	W 53-44	7-3	Tyson Events Center	2,529
13	Saturday	May 22	3:45pm	San Angelo Stampede Express	W 42-35	8-3	Hartman Arena	3,483
14	Bye							
15	Saturday	June 5	3:45pm	at Green Bay Blizzard	L 38-40	8-4	Resch Center	NA
16	Saturday	June 12	7:05pm	Sioux City Bandits	W 67-17	9-4	Hartman Arena	3,103
17	Saturday	June 19	7:05pm	at Omaha Beef	L 31-48	9-5	Omaha Civic Auditorium	2,146

=== Standings ===
2010 Central West Division
	W	L	T	PCT	GB	DIV	PF	PA	STK
y-Sioux Falls Storm	11	3	0	0.786	---	9-2	665	524	W1
x-Wichita Wild	9	5	0	0.643	2.0	7-4	639	522	L1
x-Omaha Beef	9	5	0	0.643	2.0	6-4	497	435	W2
Sioux City Bandits	4	10	0	0.286	7.0	3-9	539	726	L6
Colorado Ice	2	12	0	0.143	9.0	1-7	531	684	L3

=== Playoffs ===
Round	Day	Date	Kickoff	Opponent	Results		Location	Attendance
Round	Day	Date	Kickoff	Opponent	Final Score	Team Record	Location	Attendance
UC Quarterfinals	Saturday	June 26	7:05pm	Bloomington Extreme	W 61-48	---	Hartman Arena	2,413
UC Semifinals	Friday	July 2	7:05pm	Rochester Raiders	W 45-33	---	Hartman Arena	2,941
UC Championship	Saturday	July 10	7:15pm	at Sioux Falls Storm	L 34-52	---	Sioux Falls Arena	NA

== Roster ==
2010 Wichita Wild roster
Quarterbacks: 16 Dixie Wooten; Running backs: 28 Darius Fudge; Wide receivers: 8 Hurtiss Chinn; 82 Edgar Givens; 1 Clinton Solomon	Offensive linemen: 66 D. J. Howell; 66 John Mobley; 97 Greg Nicks; Defensive linemen: 64 Robert Franklin; 56 James McCartney; 48 Teon Wilson	Linebackers: 12 Tanis Ready; Defensive backs: 3 Byron Garvin; 18 Brandon Kaufman; 4 Randy Kelly; 7 Donta Moore; 23 Chris Patterson; Kickers: 21 Dylan Pohlman	Injured Reserve: currently vacant; Exempt List: currently vacant; Refused to Report: currently vacant; rookies in italics Roster updated June 11, 2011; 20 Active, 0 Inactive → More rosters
