= 2010 Sioux Falls Storm season =

Indoor Football League team season

- Owner: Todd Tryon
- Head coach: Kurtiss Riggs
- Home stadium: Sioux Falls Arena; 1201 North West Avenue; Sioux Falls, SD 57104

Results
- Record: 11-3
- Division place: 1st Central West
- Playoffs: Won United Conference Quarterfinals 42-23 (Beef); Won United Conference Semifinals 47-33 (Slaughter); Won United Conference Championship 52-34 (Wild); Lost 2010 United Bowl 34-43 (Outlaws)

The 2010 Sioux Falls Storm season was the team's eleventh season as a football franchise and second in the Indoor Football League (IFL). One of twenty-five teams competing in the IFL for the 2010 season, the Storm were members of the Great Plains Division of the United Conference. The team played their home games at the Sioux Falls Arena in Sioux Falls, South Dakota.

== Schedule ==
Win Tie Loss Bye

=== Regular season ===
Week	Day	Date	Kickoff	Opponent	Results		Location
Week	Day	Date	Kickoff	Opponent	Final Score	Team Record	Location
1	Bye						
2	Saturday	March 6	7:05pm	at Omaha Beef	W 54-47	1-0	Omaha Civic Auditorium
3	Saturday	March 13	7:05pm	at Wichita Wild	W 43-34	2-0	Hartman Arena
4	Monday	March 22	7:05pm	Billings Outlaws	W 37-31	3-0	Sioux Falls Arena
5	Sunday	March 28	3:05pm	La Crosse Spartans	W 45-13	4-0	Sioux Falls Arena
6	Saturday	April 3	7:05pm	Wichita Wild	L 26-44	4-1	Sioux Falls Arena
7	Friday	April 10	7:05pm	at Sioux City Bandits	W 57-23	5-1	Tyson Events Center
8	Saturday	April 17	7:05pm	at Wichita Wild	W 34-27	6-1	Hartman Arena
9	Bye						
10	Saturday	May 1	7:05pm	Colorado Ice	W 41-28	7-1	Sioux Falls Arena
11	Saturday	May 8	7:05pm	at Sioux City Bandits	W 43-38	8-1	Tyson Events Center
12	Saturday	May 15	7:05pm	Omaha Beef	L 37-43	8-2	Sioux Falls Arena
13	Bye						
14	Saturday	May 29	7:05pm	Omaha Beef	W 57-56	9-2	Sioux Falls Arena
15	Saturday	June 5	7:00pm	at Colorado Ice	W 73-44	10-2	Budweiser Events Center
16	Saturday	June 12	7:05pm	at Billings Outlaws	L 40-60	10-3	Rimrock Auto Arena at MetraPark
17	Saturday	June 19	7:05pm	Sioux City Bandits	W 78-36	11-3	Sioux Falls Arena

=== Standings ===
2010 Central West Division
	W	L	T	PCT	GB	DIV	PF	PA	STK
y-Sioux Falls Storm	11	3	0	0.786	---	9-2	665	524	W1
x-Wichita Wild	9	5	0	0.643	2.0	7-4	639	522	L1
x-Omaha Beef	9	5	0	0.643	2.0	6-4	497	435	W2
Sioux City Bandits	4	10	0	0.286	7.0	3-9	539	726	L6
Colorado Ice	2	12	0	0.143	9.0	1-7	531	684	L3

=== Playoffs ===
Round	Day	Date	Kickoff	Opponent	Results		Location
Round	Day	Date	Kickoff	Opponent	Final Score	Team Record	Location
UC Quarterfinals	Saturday	June 26	7:05pm	Omaha Beef	W 42-23	---	Sioux Falls Arena
UC Semifinals	Saturday	July 3	7:05pm	Chicago Slaughter	W 47-33	---	Sioux Falls Arena
UC Championship	Saturday	July 10	7:15pm	Wichita Wild	W 52-34	---	Sioux Falls Arena
2010 United Bowl	Saturday	July 17	7:00pm	at Billings Outlaws	L 34-43	---	Billings Sports Plex

== Roster ==
2010 Sioux Falls Storm roster
Quarterbacks: 10 Lorenzo Brown; 5 Terrance Bryant; Running backs: 34 Mickey Dean; 8 James Jones; 1 Sean Treasure; Wide receivers: 84 Dusty Hovorka; 2 Jason Jones; 9 James Terry	Offensive linemen: 56 Bruce McCaleb; 77 Isaac Snell; 74 Kyle Staudt; 69 Zac Tubbs; Defensive linemen: 52 Rachman Crable; 96 Cory Johnson; 43 Leif Murphy; 99 Tyrone Saterfield	Linebackers: 14 Mark Blackburn; 15 Jameel Brady; Defensive backs: 3 Kenneth Akridge; 2 Stewart Franks; 41 Brian McIntire; 23 T. J. Simmons; 24 Larry Williams; Kickers: 38 Rob Zarrilli	Injured reserve: Currently vacant; Exempt list: Currently vacant; Practice squad: Currently vacant; Rookies in italics Roster updated July 17, 2010; 24 Active, 0 Inactive, 0 PS
