= Xzavie Jackson =

American gridiron football player and coach (born 1984)

Tucson Sugar Skulls
- Title: Defensive coordinator, defensive line coach

Personal information
- Born: September 21, 1984 (age 42); Vacaville, California, U.S.
- Listed height: 6 ft 4 in (1.93 m)
- Listed weight: 285 lb (129 kg)

Career information
- Position: Defensive lineman
- High school: Heights (Wichita, Kansas)
- College: Missouri
- NFL draft: 2007: undrafted

Career history

Playing
- Cincinnati Bengals (2007)*; Philadelphia Eagles (2007–2008)*; RiverCity Rage (2009); Edmonton Eskimos (2009); La Crosse Spartans (2010–2011); Tampa Bay Storm (2011); Cedar Rapids Titans (2012–2016); Iowa Barnstormers (2013)*; Nebraska Danger (2017-2018)
- * Offseason or practice squad member only

Coaching
- 2019 Nebraska Danger: Special teams coordinator / Defensive-line coach; 2020 Tucson Sugar Skulls: Defensive coordinator / Defensive-line coach

Awards and highlights
- 3× 1st Team All-IFL (2011, 2013, 2016); 2nd Team All-IFL (2012); IFL's Top 10 Players #7 (2013)

Career AFL statistics
- Total tackles: 1
- Stats at ArenaFan.com

Xzavie Lee HeBron Jackson [ex-ZAY-vee] (born September 21, 1984) is an American former professional football player who was a defensive end. He played for the Cedar Rapids Titans of the Indoor Football League (IFL). He was signed by the Cincinnati Bengals as an undrafted free agent in 2007. He played college football for the Missouri Tigers. He also played in the CFL with the Edmonton Eskimos in 2009.

== Early life ==
Jackson attended Will C. Wood High School in Vacaville, California, and then Wichita Heights High School in Wichita, Kansas, where he played standout tight end.

== Professional career ==
=== Edmonton Eskimos ===
Jackson played for the Edmonton Eskimos of the Canadian Football League in 2009. He recorded nine tackles, one sack, and one forced fumble that season, but was mostly remembered for attacking teammate Aaron Fiacconi with a shovel during practice.

=== Cedar Rapids Titans ===
Jackson signed with the Cedar Rapids Titans in 2012.

=== Nebraska Danger ===
Jackson signed with the Nebraska Danger on November 4, 2016. He signed on for the 2018 IFL season, announcing that it would be his last before retiring. Prior to the season's start, he had accumulated 77 sacks in his IFL career, the most in the league. Jackson finished the season injured, but in 11 games, he had accumulated 24 tackles, an interception, three forced fumbles, three fumble recoveries (including one for a touchdown), and a kickoff return for six yards. He also racked up 4.5 more sacks, adding to his league record for most career sacks with a new total of 81.5. For his statistics during this final season of play, he was named to the second team, All-IFL roster.

During the games he spent injured, Jackson transitioned into a coaching role for younger players, and assumed coaching duties full-time for the 2019 season.
