= Rochester Jr. Americans (1999–2000) =

- City: Rochester, New York
- League: North American Hockey League
- Division: East
- Founded: 1999
- Folded: 2000
- Home arena: ESL Sports Centre
- Colors: Blue, red and white
- Head coach: Donald Kirnan

Franchise history
- 1999–2000: Rochester Jr. Americans

The Rochester Jr. Americans were a Tier II junior ice hockey team that played in the North American Hockey League (NAHL).

== History ==
The American Hockey League Rochester Americans began sponsoring a junior club in the NAHL in 1999. This was at least the third time the Americans had supported a 'Jr. American' squad with two previous attempts playing in the Northeastern Junior Hockey League and the Golden Horseshoe Junior Hockey League. Donald Kirnan was hired to coach the team but the Jr. Americans had very little success and finished last in the standings. After the year, the Americans withdrew from the league and dissolved their Tier II team, focusing instead on the tier III team of the same name that played out of the Empire Junior Hockey League.

Despite lasting for just one season, the Jr. Americans produced two players that would reach the National Hockey League: Stephen Gionta and Thomas Vanek.

== Season-by-season records ==
| Season | GP | W | L | OTL | Pts | GF | GA | Finish | Playoffs |
|---|---|---|---|---|---|---|---|---|---|
| 1999–2000 | 56 | 12 | 41 | 3 | 27 | 166 | 260 | 6th of 6, East; 11th of 11, NAHL | Did not qualify |
