= Tim Hortons Iceplex =

Indoor athletics facility in Brighton, New York, US

- Interactive map of Tim Hortons Iceplex
- Former names: Bill Gray's Regional Iceplex (2013–2023); ESL Sports Centre (1998–2009); Sports Centre at MCC (2009–2013)
- Location: Brighton, New York
- Coordinates: 43.0980°N 77.6028°W
- Owner: Monroe Community Sports Centre Corporation
- Capacity: 1,750 (Chick-fil-A Arena)
- Surface: Ice
- Acreage: 180,000-square-foot (17,000 m^{2})

Construction
- Built: 1998
- Cost: US$13 million
- General contractor: Christa Development Corporation

Tenants
- Rochester Jr. Americans (NAHL) (1999–2000); Rochester Raiders (GLIFL/AIF) (2006, 2014); Roc City Roller Derby (WFTDA) (2013–present); Rochester Americans (practice facility)

Website
- www.timhortonsiceplex.com

Tim Hortons Iceplex is a 180,000-square-foot (17,000 m^{2}) non-profit indoor athletics facility in the Rochester, New York suburb of Brighton. Located on the campus of Monroe Community College, the arena was built in 1998. It is home to four regulation-size ice rinks for semi-professional, high school, and youth hockey teams' use. The Iceplex is home to youth hockey teams from Rochester Youth Hockey, Rochester Edge Girls Hockey, Rochester Coalition, Rochester Grizzlies Hockey, Perinton Youth Hockey, Spencerport High School Hockey, Roc City Roller Derby, Girls Selects Academy at Bishop Kearney, St. John Fisher Club Hockey, Nazareth Golden Flyers Men's and Women's Division III NCAA Hockey, Rochester Ice Cats Special Hockey, and other local teams. The arena also serves as the Rochester Americans official practice facility, and the USA Paralympic Sled Hockey Team chose it as their official training site in 2010.

In 2008, 87 events were held at the facility, drawing nearly 33,000 players and spectators. Prior to the 2018 World Junior Ice Hockey Championships in nearby Buffalo, The Iceplex hosted some national teams and exhibition games leading up to that tournament.

The naming agreement with Canadian fast food chain Tim Hortons was announced in October 2023. The facility was known as Bill Gray's Regional Iceplex from 2013-2023 when Monroe Community Sports Centre Corporation cut ties from the local restaurant group. The facility was known as the ESL Sports Centre through 2009, when ESL Federal Credit Union dropped its sponsorship. From that point until April 2013, when Bill Gray's picked up sponsorship (with a 30-year agreement), the facility was known as the Sports Centre at MCC. The facility underwent a 3,000-square-foot expansion in 2017 that cost $2.2 million and included a new fitness center as well as a physical therapy and sports rehab area.

== Ice resurfacer fire ==
On October 14, 2020, an Olympia ice resurfacer caught fire as it was resurfacing the ice after a youth hockey practice. Video of the fire went viral over social media platforms. The driver of the ice resurfacer was not hurt and no other injuries were sustained. Bill Gray's Regional Iceplex released a statement on their social media accounts saying that the cause of the fire was a broken hose, which caused hydraulic fluid to leak onto a hot exhaust pipe, igniting the fluid and causing the flames.
