= 2010 Colorado Ice season =

Indoor Football League team season

- Owner: Tom Wigley
- Head coach: Collins Sanders
- Home stadium: Budweiser Events Center; 5290 Arena Circle; Loveland, Colorado 80538

Results
- Record: 2–12
- Division place: 5th Central West
- Playoffs: did not qualify

The 2010 Colorado Ice season was the team's fourth season as a professional indoor football franchise and second in the Indoor Football League (IFL). One of twenty-five teams that competed in the IFL in the 2010 season, the Fort Collins-based Colorado Ice were members of the United Conference.

Founded in 2007 as part of United Indoor Football, the Colorado Ice became charter members of the IFL when the UIF merged with the Intense Football League before the 2009 season. In their fourth season under head coach Collins Sanders, the team played their home games at the Budweiser Events Center in Loveland, Colorado.

On April 1, 2010, Thomas Wrigley purchased the team.

Linebacker Landon Jones was named the IFL Defensive Rookie of the Year at the conclusion of the season.

== Schedule ==
Key: Win Tie Loss Bye

=== Regular season ===
All start times are local time

| Week | Day | Date | Kickoff | Opponent | Results | | Location |
| Week | Day | Date | Kickoff | Opponent | Score | Record | Location |
|---|---|---|---|---|---|---|---|
| 1 | Saturday | February 27 | 7:05pm | Sioux City Bandits | L 38–48 | 0–1 | Budweiser Events Center |
| 2 | Friday | March 5 | 7:15pm | Billings Outlaws | L 39–47 | 0–2 | Budweiser Events Center |
| 3 | BYE | | | | | | |
| 4 | Saturday | March 20 | 7:05pm | at Wichita Wild | L 40–54 | 0–3 | Hartman Arena |
| 5 | Saturday | March 27 | 7:10pm | at Sioux City Bandits | L 28–55 | 0–4 | Tyson Events Center |
| 6 | BYE | | | | | | |
| 7 | Sunday | April 11 | 4:05pm | at Billings Outlaws | L 47–71 | 0–5 | Rimrock Auto Arena at MetraPark |
| 8 | Sunday | April 18 | 3:00pm | Amarillo Venom | L 37–56 | 0–6 | Budweiser Events Center |
| 9 | Saturday | April 24 | 7:05pm | at Amarillo Venom | L 41–47 | 0–7 | Amarillo Civic Center |
| 10 | Saturday | May 1 | 7:05pm | at Sioux Falls Storm | L 28–41 | 0–8 | Sioux Falls Arena |
| 11 | Saturday | May 8 | 7:00pm | Wichita Wild | L 30–32 | 0–9 | Budweiser Events Center |
| 12 | Saturday | May 15 | 7:00pm | Tri-Cities Fever | W 57–41 | 1–9 | Budweiser Events Center |
| 13 | BYE | | | | | | |
| 14 | Saturday | May 29 | 7:00pm | Sioux City Bandits | W 42–38 | 2–9 | Budweiser Events Center |
| 15 | Saturday | June 5 | 7:00pm | Sioux Falls Storm | L 4–73 | 2–10 | Budweiser Events Center |
| 16 | Saturday | June 12 | 7:05pm | Omaha Beef | L 27–39 | 2–11 | Omaha Civic Auditorium |
| 17 | Friday | June 18 | 7:00pm | at Fairbanks Grizzlies | L 33–42 | 2–12 | Carlson Center |

== Standings ==
2010 Central West Division
| | W | L | T | PCT | GB | DIV | PF | PA | STK |
|---|---|---|---|---|---|---|---|---|---|
| y-Sioux Falls Storm | 11 | 3 | 0 | 0.786 | --- | 9-2 | 665 | 524 | W1 |
| x-Wichita Wild | 9 | 5 | 0 | 0.643 | 2.0 | 7-4 | 639 | 522 | L1 |
| x-Omaha Beef | 9 | 5 | 0 | 0.643 | 2.0 | 6-4 | 497 | 435 | W2 |
| Sioux City Bandits | 4 | 10 | 0 | 0.286 | 7.0 | 3-9 | 539 | 726 | L6 |
| Colorado Ice | 2 | 12 | 0 | 0.143 | 9.0 | 1-7 | 531 | 684 | L3 |

== Roster ==
2010 Colorado Ice roster
| Quarterbacks: 1 Oliver Bozeman; 12 Sherard Ellis; Running backs: 13 Bobby Purify; Wide receivers: 3 Lemans Casimier; 8 Jason English; 4 Cory Sleeth; 21 Terry Washington; 18 Kenneth Witter | Offensive linemen: 75 Tyrone Lewis; 60 Tyler Staley; Defensive linemen: 33 Dominic Applehans; 97 Malachi McGee; 10 Jermaine Smith; 95 Bryan Wick | Linebackers: 40 Landon Jones; Defensive backs: 43 Idly Etienne; 7 Ryan Harris; 15 Nick Oppenneer; 20 Corey Sample; Special teams: 26 Rocky Stevens | Reserve lists: 5 David Knighton QB (IR); Rookies in italics Roster updated June 18, 2010; 19 Active, 1 Inactive → More rosters |
