= National Collegiate Open Wrestling Championship =

- Genre: NCAA collegiate wrestling
- Country: USA
- Years active: 2009–present
- Established: 2008
- Most recent: 2013 Richmond, Virginia, U.S. (hosted by Virginia Wrestling Association)
- Management: Wexvar LLC
- Website: NationalCollegiateOpen.com

The National Collegiate Open Wrestling Championship is a collegiate wrestling event that serves as a post season championship for NCAA Division-I athletes that are not wrestling in their conference championship. The event is traditionally known for the redshirting wrestlers entered but often includes accomplished and seasoned wrestlers that were unable to make their program's starting line-up.

== Expansion into Divisions ==
Starting with the 2013 Championship in Richmond, Virginia, the National Collegiate Open will split NCAA Division-I athletes from the rest of the field. The Division-I division is called the University Division while the College Division will serve the athletes from the other NCAA divisions, as well as NAIA, USCAA, and NJCAA.

== Criticisms ==
Though the National Collegiate Open is attended by the majority of the NCAA Division-I wrestling programs, the event has been criticised for having a field that has too many athletes from the east coast, absent of some of the strongest college wrestling programs. The 2011 season brought more legitimacy when the University of Missouri and the University of Oklahoma attended for the first time but the claim has been made, by some in the wrestling community, that the event will not be a true national event until the three most storied programs (University of Iowa, Oklahoma State University, and University of Minnesota) decide to attend. Note: University of Minnesota attended the 2012 event.

== Most NCO Champions at single Championship ==
Team	Year	Champions
Rutgers University	2011	3
University of Minnesota	2012	3
Cornell University	2012	2
Kent State University	2009	2
University of Minnesota	2012	2
Pennsylvania State University	2010	2
Virginia Tech	2012	2

== Most NCO All-Americans at single Championship ==
Team	Year	All-Americans
Kent State University	2009	8
Lehigh University	2010	7
Rutgers University	2011	7
Old Dominion University	2012	7
Central Michigan University	2010	6
Indiana University	2009	6
Purdue University	2012	6
University of Maryland	2010	6

== All-Time NCO Individual Championships by School ==
Team	Champions
University of Minnesota	3
Kent State University	2
Rutgers University	3
Cornell University	3
Indiana University	1
University of Maryland	1
Cal Poly	1
American University	1
Hofstra University	1
United States Naval Academy	1
West Virginia University	2
Pennsylvania State University	4
Lehigh University	2
Virginia Tech	2
Bloomsburg University of Pennsylvania	1
University of Virginia	1
Ohio State University	1
Lock Haven University of Pennsylvania	1
Eastern Michigan University	1
University of Pittsburgh	1
University of Michigan	1
Michigan State University	1
