= Darnell Terrell =

American gridiron football player (born 1984)

No. 21
- Position: Defensive back

Personal information
- Born: May 30, 1984 (age 42); St. Louis, Missouri, U.S.
- Listed height: 6 ft 3 in (1.91 m)
- Listed weight: 200 lb (91 kg)

Career information
- High school: Eureka (MO)
- College: Missouri
- NFL draft: 2008: undrafted

Career history
- Cleveland Browns (2008)*; RiverCity Rage (2009); Edmonton Eskimos (2009)*; Omaha Beef (2010)*; La Crosse Spartans (2010); Nebraska Danger (2011–2015)
- * Offseason or practice squad member only

Awards and highlights
- First-team All-IFL (2010)

Darnell Terrell (born May 30, 1984) is an American former professional football cornerback. He was signed as an undrafted free agent by the Cleveland Browns in 2008. He played college football for the Missouri Tigers. He was also a member of the RiverCity Rage, Edmonton Eskimos, Omaha Beef, La Crosse Spartans, and Nebraska Danger.

== Professional career ==
=== Cleveland Browns ===
Terrell was not selected in the 2008 NFL draft, and was signed by the Cleveland Browns on April 30, 2008, as an undrafted free agent but was released on June 17, 2008.

=== Edmonton Eskimos ===
Terrell was signed by the Edmonton Eskimos on April 23, 2009. He was released on June 6, 2009.

=== La Crosse Spartans ===
Set the La Crosse Spartans interception record at 7 in 2010, and was voted First-team All-IFL by the league.

=== Nebraska Danger ===
Terrell played for the Nebraska Danger of the Indoor Football League from 2011 to 2015.
