= Bryan Randall =

American gridiron football player (born 1983)

William & Mary Tribe
- Title: Quarterbacks coach

Personal information
- Born: August 16, 1983 (age 43); Charleston, West Virginia, U.S.
- Listed height: 6 ft 2 in (1.88 m)
- Listed weight: 220 lb (100 kg)

Career information
- Position: Quarterback (No. 3, 9)
- High school: Bruton (Williamsburg, Virginia)
- College: Virginia Tech
- NFL draft: 2005: undrafted

Career history

Playing
- Atlanta Falcons (2005)*; Tampa Bay Buccaneers (2006)*; Pittsburgh Steelers (2007)*; Winnipeg Blue Bombers (2008–2009); Richmond Revolution (2010); Richmond Raiders (2011); Allen Wranglers (2012); Lehigh Valley Steelhawks (2012); Pittsburgh Power (2012); Laredo Rattlesnakes (2013); Philadelphia Soul (2014–2015); Duke City Gladiators (2016); Qingdao Clipper (2016); Richmond Roughriders (2018)
- * Offseason or practice squad member only

Coaching
- William & Mary (2025–present) Quarterbacks coach

Awards and highlights
- ACC Player of the Year (2004); Dudley Award (2004); First-team All-ACC (2004); IFL Most Valuable Player (2010); LSFL Most Valuable Player (2013); CAFL All-Pro North Division All-Star (2016); Records: Big East single game passing (504 yards); Virginia Tech career passing (6,508); Virginia Tech career total offense (8,034 yards)

Career CFL statistics
- Completions: 15
- Attempts: 42
- Passing yards: 157
- TD–INT: 0–5

Career AFL statistics
- Comp. / Att.: 204 / 327
- Passing yards: 2,527
- TD–INT: 49–9
- Passer rating: 112.26
- Rushing touchdowns: 3
- Stats at ArenaFan.com

Bryan Jemar Randall (born August 16, 1983) is an American former professional football quarterback. He was signed by the Atlanta Falcons as an undrafted free agent in 2005. He played college football for the Virginia Tech Hokies. Randall was also a member of the Tampa Bay Buccaneers, Pittsburgh Steelers, and Winnipeg Blue Bombers, as well as several indoor football teams. He is currently the quarterbacks coach for the William & Mary Tribe.

== Early life ==
Bryan Jemar Randall was born on August 16, 1983, in Charleston, West Virginia.

Randall attended Bruton High School in Williamsburg, Virginia, where he established new school records for passing yards (6,508) and total offense (8,034 yards). On the final passing attempt of his college career, he broke the school record for touchdown passes (47). He also played on the 2000 AA State Championship basketball team captained by Hughes McLean, Brandon Randall and Albot.

== College career ==
For the 2001 season, Randall served as backup quarterback to starter Grant Noel, seeing limited game action.

In 2002, Randall came into the game against Louisiana State in relief of Noel, who was being hampered by an injury sustained during spring practice. Randall started the remaining 12 games that season. In a shocking 50–42 overtime loss to Syracuse, Randall passed for 504 yards - a Big East Conference record - and five touchdowns.

In 2003, Randall played both basketball and football for Virginia Tech. While playing basketball Randall split the quarterback duties with highly touted redshirt freshman quarterback Marcus Vick. Randall started all thirteen games for Virginia Tech, completing 150 of 245 passes for 1,996 yards and 15 touchdowns with eight interceptions, Vick played in every game.

Following the 2003 season, Marcus Vick ran afoul of the law and was suspended for the 2004 season. Randall, the undisputed senior starter, culminated his college career in 2004, throwing for 2,264 yards and rushing for 511 yards. He led the team to its first ACC Championship and a berth in the 2005 Sugar Bowl, narrowly losing to Auburn. His accomplishments at Virginia Tech earned him a spot in the university's sports hall of fame. Randall was also a National Football Foundation National Scholar-Athlete in 2004.

=== College statistics ===
Season	Team	Passing								Rushing			
Season	Team	Cmp	Att	Pct	Yds	Y/A	TD	Int	Rtg	Att	Yds	Avg	TD
2001	Virginia Tech	12	34	35.3	114	3.4	0	1	57.6	20	104	5.2	0
2002	Virginia Tech	158	248	63.7	2,134	8.6	12	11	143.1	171	507	3.0	3
2003	Virginia Tech	150	245	61.2	1,996	8.1	15	10	141.7	82	404	4.9	5
2004	Virginia Tech	170	306	55.6	2,264	7.4	21	9	134.5	136	511	3.8	3
Career		490	833	58.8	6,508	7.8	48	31	136.0	409	1,526	3.7	11

== Professional career ==
Randall was rated the 17th best quarterback in the 2005 NFL draft by NFLDraftScout.com.

Pre-draft measurables
Height	Weight	40-yard dash	10-yard split	20-yard split	20-yard shuttle	Three-cone drill	Vertical jump	Broad jump	Wonderlic
6 ft 0 in (1.83 m)	225 lb (102 kg)	4.76 s	1.71 s	2.79 s	4.08 s	6.97 s	33 in (0.84 m)	9 ft 5 in (2.87 m)	19
All values from NFL Combine

=== Atlanta Falcons ===
Despite his success in 2004, Randall went undrafted in the 2005 NFL draft. As an undrafted free agent, Randall was signed to play Quarterback for the Atlanta Falcons on April 26, 2005, where another former Hokie, Michael Vick, played. Cut on September 5 to meet the NFL roster size limit, he was re-signed the following day to the Falcon's practice squad.

=== Tampa Bay Buccaneers ===
Randall was signed to the Tampa Bay Buccaneers practice squad on October 2, 2006 where he spent the 2006 season.

=== Pittsburgh Steelers ===
On February 9, 2007, it was announced that the Pittsburgh Steelers had signed Randall. He was assured a chance to play quarterback, something the Falcons nor Buccaneers would do. After the last preseason game with the Steelers, he was cut.

=== AAFL ===
On January 26, 2008, Randall was selected round 1, pick 2 of the inaugural draft by Team Tennessee. However, he was released from his contract when the AAFL postponed its debut season.

=== Winnipeg Blue Bombers ===
On May 20, 2008, Randall signed with the Winnipeg Blue Bombers and was the team's third quarterback behind starter Kevin Glenn and backup Ryan Dinwiddie. In the team's 2009 training camp he competed for the second-string quarterback behind starter Stefan LeFors, with Richie Williams. He was released on September 23, 2009.

=== Richmond Revolution ===
On February 11, 2010, the Richmond Revolution announced they had signed Randall for their inaugural 2010 season. Randall led the Revolution to a league best 13–1 record, and home field throughout the playoffs. Randall threw for 58 touchdowns, running for an additional 12, and throwing for over 2,000 yards in his rookie season in the IFL. On June 23, 2010, Randall was announced as the winner of the 2010 IFL Most Valuable Player award. Despite an MVP performance in the Revolution's inaugural season, Randall was released, along with virtually the entire roster, on December 13, 2010.

=== Richmond Raiders ===
Although there was speculation that Randall could sign with the Virginia Destroyers of the United Football League, Randall spent the spring of 2011 playing indoor football again. He signed with the Richmond Raiders of the Southern Indoor Football League, but suffered a season-ending injury on March 19, 2011, in a game against the Trenton Steel. He is no longer listed on their roster.

=== Allen Wranglers ===
Randall announced via Twitter that he would be spending the 2012 IFL season in Allen, Texas with former NFL wide receiver Terrell Owens. Randall beat out Casey Printers, a former CFL starter, for the starting quarterback position.

=== Lehigh Valley Steelhawks ===
He was traded to the Lehigh Valley Steelhawks on March 6, 2012.

=== Pittsburgh Power ===
He was assigned by the Pittsburgh Power of the Arena Football League (AFL) on April 18, 2012.

=== Laredo Rattlesnakes ===
Randall played for the Laredo Rattlesnakes in the Lone Star Football League (LSFL) in Laredo, Texas. Randall lead the Rattlesnakes to a 7–5 record and a berth in the LSFL Championship Game, where they were defeated 70–69 by the Amarillo Venom. Randall was named the league's MVP after leading the league in passing yards.

=== Philadelphia Soul ===
Randall was assigned to the Philadelphia Soul of the AFL on November 25, 2013. He was the backup to Dan Raudabaugh from 2014 to 2015.

=== Duke City Gladiators ===
In 2016, Randall signed with the Duke City Gladiators.

=== Qingdao Clipper ===
Randall was selected by the Qingdao Clipper of the China Arena Football League (CAFL) in the first round of the 2016 CAFL draft. He was the starting quarterback for the Clipper during the 2016 season and helped the team earn a berth in the first China Bowl, where the Clipper lost to the Beijing Lions by a score of 35–34. He completed 94 of 165 passes for 1,288 yards, 25 touchdowns and 5 interceptions in 2016. He was named an All-Pro North Division All-Star as an athlete. He was listed on the Clipper's roster for the 2018 season.

=== Richmond Roughriders ===
On March 27, 2018, it was announced that Randall had joined the Richmond Roughriders.

== Coaching career ==
Randall became the quarterbacks coach of the William & Mary Tribe in February 2025.
