= 2010 Indoor Football League season =

2010 IFL season
- League: Indoor Football League
- Sport: Indoor Football
- Duration: February 26, 2010 – July 17, 2010
- Teams: 25

Regular season
- Season champions: Richmond Revolution
- Season MVP: Bryan Randall

Playoffs
- Intense champions: Billings Outlaws
- Intense runners-up: Arkansas Diamonds
- United champions: Sioux Falls Storm
- United runners-up: Wichita Wild

2011 United Bowl Championship
- Champions: Billings Outlaws
- Runners-up: Sioux Falls Storm
- Finals MVP: Chris Dixon

IFL seasons
- ← 2009 2011 →

The 2010 Indoor Football League season was the second season of the Indoor Football League (IFL). The regular season began on Friday, February 26 and ended on Saturday, June 19. In March, the Indoor Football League took control of the Alaska Wild and intended to operate the team until a new owner was found or the season ended. In May, after nine games and no new ownership identified, the team forfeited its remaining home games, played its final road game against Tri-Cities under league auspices, and then ceased operations. After three weeks of playoffs the season ended with the 2010 United Bowl on July 17 where the Billings Outlaws defeated the Sioux Falls Storm.

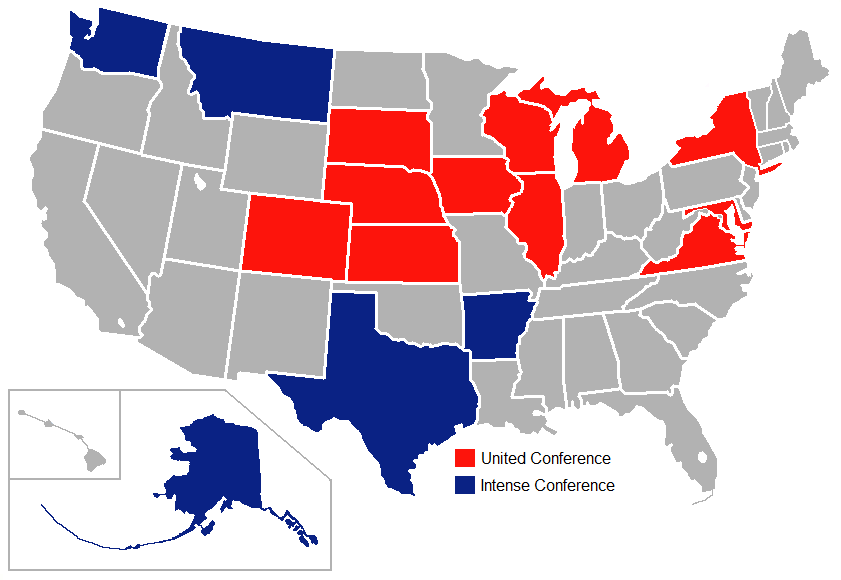

== Standings ==
=== United Conference ===
Atlantic East
Team	W	L	PCT
z-Richmond Revolution	13	1	.929
y-Rochester Raiders	9	5	.643
West Michigan ThunderHawks	5	9	.357
Maryland Maniacs	1	13	.071

Central North
Team	W	L	PCT
x-Green Bay Blizzard	10	4	.714
y-Bloomington Extreme	9	5	.643
y-Chicago Slaughter	6	8	.429
La Crosse Spartans	3	11	.214

Central West
Team	W	L	PCT
x-Sioux Falls Storm	11	3	.786
y-Wichita Wild	9	5	.643
y-Omaha Beef	9	5	.643
Sioux City Bandits	4	10	.286
Colorado Ice	2	12	.143

=== Intense Conference ===
Lonestar East
Team	W	L	PCT
x-Arkansas Diamonds	11	3	.786
y-San Angelo Stampede Express	10	4	.714
y-Corpus Christi Hammerheads	6	8	.429
Austin Turfcats	2	12	.143

Lonestar West
Team	W	L	PCT
x-Amarillo Venom	11	3	.786
y-West Texas Roughnecks	7	7	.500
Abilene Ruff Riders	2	12	.143

Pacific North
Team	W	L	PCT
z-Billings Outlaws	12	2	.857
y-Fairbanks Grizzlies	9	5	.643
y-Tri-Cities Fever	7	7	.500
Kent Predators	5	9	.357
Alaska Wild	2	12	.143

z=clinched top seed in conference, x=clinched division, y=clinched wild card spot

== Playoffs ==
Conference Quarterfinals	Conference Semifinals
2	Rochester	26
1	Richmond	24
AE2	Rochester	33
CW2	Wichita	45
CN2	Bloomington	48
CW2	Wichita	61
United Conference
3	Chicago	46
1	Green Bay	39
CN3	Chicago	33
CW1	Sioux Falls	47
3	Omaha	23
1	Sioux Falls	42
3	Corpus Christi	29
1	Arkansas	44
LE1	Arkansas	46
LW1	Amarillo	31
2	West Texas	36
1	Amarillo	56
Intense Conference
PN2	Fairbanks	35
LE2	San Angelo	45
LE2	San Angelo	39
PN1	Billings	68
3	Tri-Cities	45
1	Billings	54

Conference Championships
2	Wichita	34
1	Sioux Falls	52
LE1	Arkansas	42
PN1	Billings	53

2010 United Bowl
U2	Sioux Falls	34
I1	Billings	43

== Awards ==
=== Individual season awards ===
Award	Winner	Position	Team
Most Valuable Player	Bryan Randall	Quarterback	Richmond Revolution
Offensive Player of the Year	Ben Sankey	Quarterback	Omaha Beef
Defensive Player of the Year	John Fields	Defensive Lineman	Kent Predators
Special Teams Player of the Year	Randy Kelly	Kick returner	Wichita Wild
Offensive Rookie of the Year	Derrick Ross	Running Back	San Angelo Stampede Express
Defensive Rookie of the Year	Landon Jones	Linebacker	Colorado Ice
Most Improved Player	Maurice Simpkins	Linebacker	Green Bay Blizzard
Adam Pringle Award	Dixie Wooten	Quarterback	Wichita Wild
Coach of the Year	Steve Criswell	Head coach	Richmond Revolution
Executive of the Year	Darlene Jones	Owner	San Angelo Stampede Express

=== 1st Team All-IFL ===
Offense
Quarterback	Chris Dixon, Billings
Running back	Derrick Ross, San Angelo
Wide receiver	Luke McArdle, Omaha; Clinton Solomon, Wichita; Kevin Conception, Rochester
Offensive tackle	Nick Marshman, Fairbanks; John Mobley, Wichita
Center	Derek Stoudt, Richmond

Defense
Defensive line	Michael Bazemore, Billings; Jon Williams, San Angelo; John Fields, Kent
Linebacker	Maurice Simpkins, Green Bay; Landon Jones, Colorado
Defensive back	Demarcus James, Richmond; Cashmin Thomas, Amarillo; Darnell Terrell, La Crosse

Special teams
Kicker	Tino Amancio, Green Bay
Kick returner	Randy Kelly, Wichita
Specialist	Eric Henri, West Texas

=== 2nd Team All-IFL ===
Offense
Quarterback	Ben Sankey, Omaha
Running back	Darius Fudge, Wichita
Wide receiver	James Terry, Sioux Falls; Thyron Lewis, Tri-Cities; James Walton, Billings
Offensive tackle	Zac Tubbs, Sioux Falls; Rasche Hill, Chicago
Center	Ronn Spinner, Maryland

Defense
Defensive end	Devonte Peterson, Omaha; Luis Vasquez, Arkansas; Jason Holman, Richmond
Linebacker	Kelly Rouse, Billings; Brenton Brady, Rochester
Defensive back	Johnell Brown, Jr., Fairbanks; Vincent Joseph, Bloomington; Kevin Patterson, Amarillo

Special teams
Kicker	David Hendrix, West Michigan
Kick returner	B. J. Hill, Green Bay
