= Richmond Revolution =

Professional football team

Logo

General information
- Founded: 2009
- Folded: 2011
- Headquartered: SportsQuest in Richmond, Virginia
- Colors: Blue, red, white
- Mascot: George the Eagle

Personnel
- Owner: SportsQuest
- General manager: Charlie Hildbold
- Head coach: Tony Hawkins

Team history
- Richmond Revolution (2010–2011)

Home fields
- Arthur Ashe Athletic Center (2010); SportsQuest (2011 outdoors)

League / conference affiliations
- Indoor Football League (2010–2011): United Conference (2010–2011); Atlantic East Division (2010); Atlantic Division (2011)

Championships
- Division championships: 1; 2010

Playoff appearances (1)
- 2010

The Richmond Revolution was a professional indoor football team based in Richmond, Virginia that played in the Indoor Football League from 2010 to 2011. For the 2010 season, they played their home games at the Arthur Ashe Athletic Center. Because of space issues at that facility the owner decided to move onto the SportsQuest campus in nearby Chesterfield for the 2011 season and play all home games outdoors, since the proposed arena had not yet been built.

However, in late August, Richmond BizSense's writer Aaron Kremer (8/25/11) reported that Charlie Hildbold, the general manager, was laid off. He had moved to Virginia to help launch the indoor arena football team. According to Steve Burton, the owner of the team, Richmond Revolution will sit out the 2012 season and be reinstated in 2013. Scott Bass a writer for Style Weekly reported (3/9/2011) nearly half of the 40 players on the Raiders' training camp roster for 2011 defected from Richmond Revolution, as well as the Revolution's head coach, Steve Criswell. On February 9, 2012, the Virginia attorney general's office filed a civil suit against SportsQuest, the company that owns the Revolution.

This was Richmond's third attempt at trying to build a long lasting indoor professional football team. The demise of Richmond Revolution left the Richmond Raiders the only team in the area. Previous teams were the Richmond Speed of the Af2 and the Richmond Bandits of the AIFL.

When the team was first organized a name-the-team contest was held on the SportsQuest webpage. Nominations continued until August 11, 2009, with the five finalist names Blitz, Rush, Rivermen, Revolution, and Reign chosen the next day. Voting continued until August 21 with the Revolution name unveiled on August 24.

The Indoor Football League announced on June 23, 2010, that the Revolution had won the 2010 IFL Franchise of the Year award. In addition the team also took home the League's Media Relations of the Year. Revolution QB Bryan Randall was named the 2010 IFL Most Valuable Player, and head coach Steve Criswell was named the IFL Coach of the Year. Later in the Steve Criswell left the team and on October 7, 2010, Richmond Revolution announced their new head coach would be former local standout Tony Hawkins. Hawkins is the all-time leading passer in Virginia State University history.

== Season-by-season ==
Season records
Season	W	L	T	Finish	Playoff results
Richmond Revolution (IFL)
2010	13	1	0	1st Atlantic East	Lost Round 1 (Rochester)
2011	3	11	0	3rd Atlantic	--
Totals	16	13	0	(including playoffs)	

== Notable players ==
=== Awards and honors ===
The following is a list of all Revolution players who have won league Awards

Season	Player	Position	Award
2010	Bryan Randall	Quarterback	Most Valuable Player

=== All-IFL players ===
The following Revolution players were named to All-IFL teams:

- OL Derek Stoudt (1)
- DL Jason Holman (1)
- DB Demarcus James (1)
