= Arthur Ashe Athletic Center =

Athletic center in Richmond, Virginia

Coordinates: 37.5733°N 77.4633°W

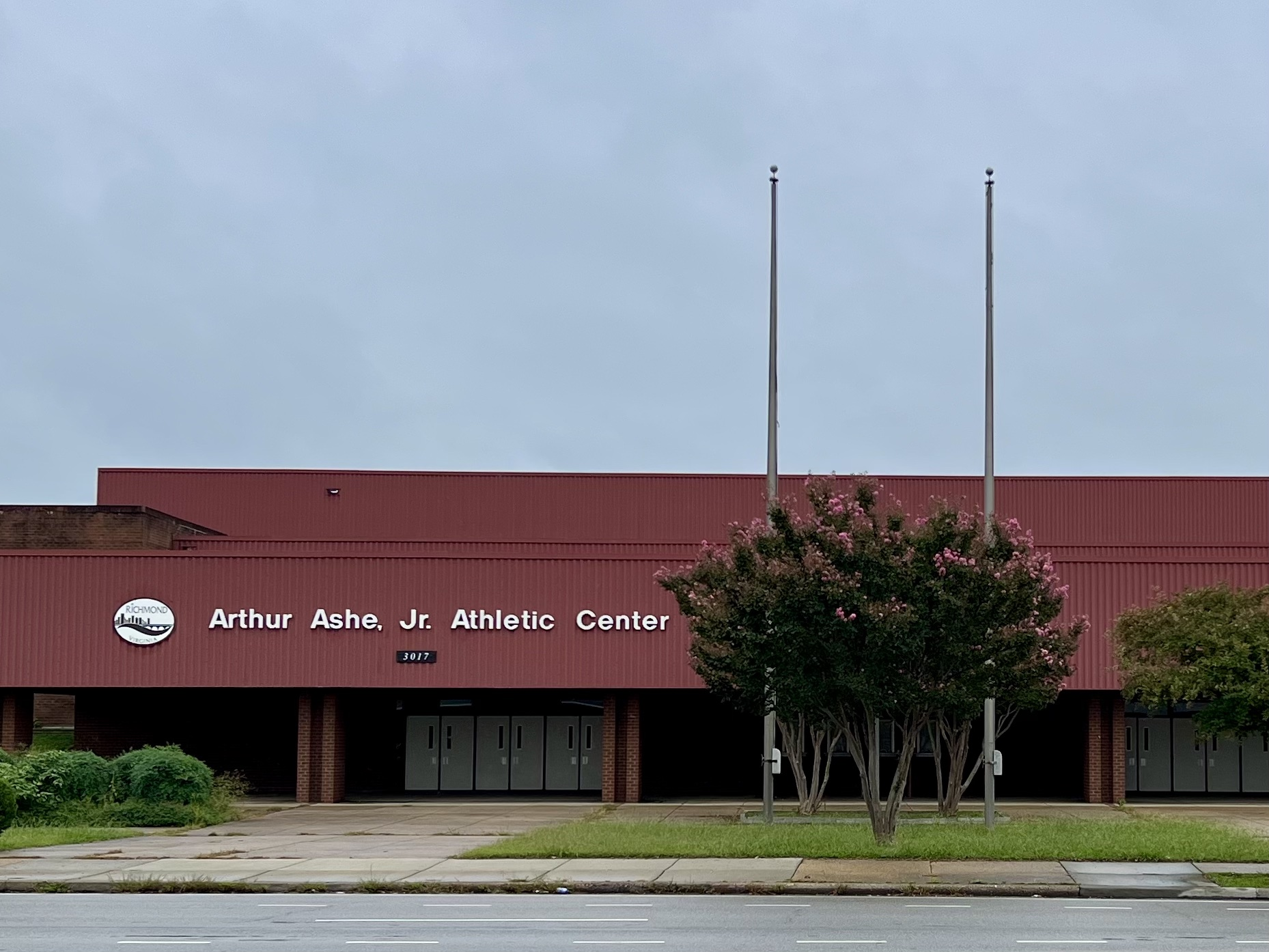
Arthur Ashe, Jr. Athletic Center in Richmond, Virginia.

The Arthur Ashe Athletic Center is a 6,000-seat multi-purpose arena in Richmond, Virginia. It was built in 1982. It hosts local sporting events and concerts. It is named after former tennis player and Richmond resident Arthur Ashe.

The Ashe Center was the temporary home to the Richmond Revolution of the Indoor Football League for the 2010 season, with announced intention of moving to a permanent home at the currently under-construction SportsQuest arena the following season. However, the SportsQuest arena was never finished and the Revolution would play the 2011 season at the outdoor field at SportsQuest before they ceased operations after that season.

The venue hosted preliminary rounds of the 2000-2005 MEAC men's basketball tournaments as well as the 2012 National Collegiate Open Wrestling Championship.
