= The Dome Center =

Convention center in Henrietta, New York

The Dome Arena
- Location within New York State
- Former names: The Dome Center; Monroe County Fairgrounds
- Location: Henrietta, New York
- Coordinates: 43.0659°N 77.6123°W
- Owner: Roxbury Dome Partners LLC
- Capacity: 4,700 (Dome); 3,000 (Minett Hall)
- Surface: Concrete
- Acreage: 25,000-square-foot (2,300 m^{2}) (Dome); 23,000-square-foot (2,100 m^{2}) (Minett Hall)

Construction
- Built: 1972

Tenants
- Rochester Zeniths (CBA) (1978–1983); Roc City Roller Derby (WFTDA) (2009–2012); Rochester Raiders (IFL) (2010); Rochester Lancers (M2/MASL) (2018–2020)

The Dome Arena is a convention complex located in the Town of Henrietta, New York, just outside the city of Rochester. It was originally part of a 60-acre site that hosted the annual Monroe County (NY) Fair between 1947 and 2013.

== Overview ==
The arena and grounds were operated by the Monroe County Fair and Recreation Association from 1947 until 2015, when the land was sold to an area developer.

In 2026 Henrietta Town officials committed to purchase the now 23-acre property. The arena will remain a large event center while the attached Minett Hall would become community and recreational space and be built out to include small offices and conference rooms that could be assigned to community groups. The remaining two-thirds of Minett Hall space would be used for gymnastics programs along with floor hockey, indoor soccer and pickleball. Additionally, construction of affordable housing units is anticipated.

== Facilities ==
=== Dome Arena ===
The Dome Arena is a 4,086-seat indoor arena with 2,164 permanent seats and 25,000 square feet (2,300 m^{2}) of exhibit space. It was built in 1972 with what was at the time one of the largest self-supporting wooden roofs in the world, and was the home of the Rochester Zeniths of the Continental Basketball Association from 1978 to 1983. It is the site of concerts, trade shows, indoor sporting events, conventions and other events. The Rochester Raiders indoor football team played there in 2010. Roc City Roller Derby played there from 2009 to 2012.

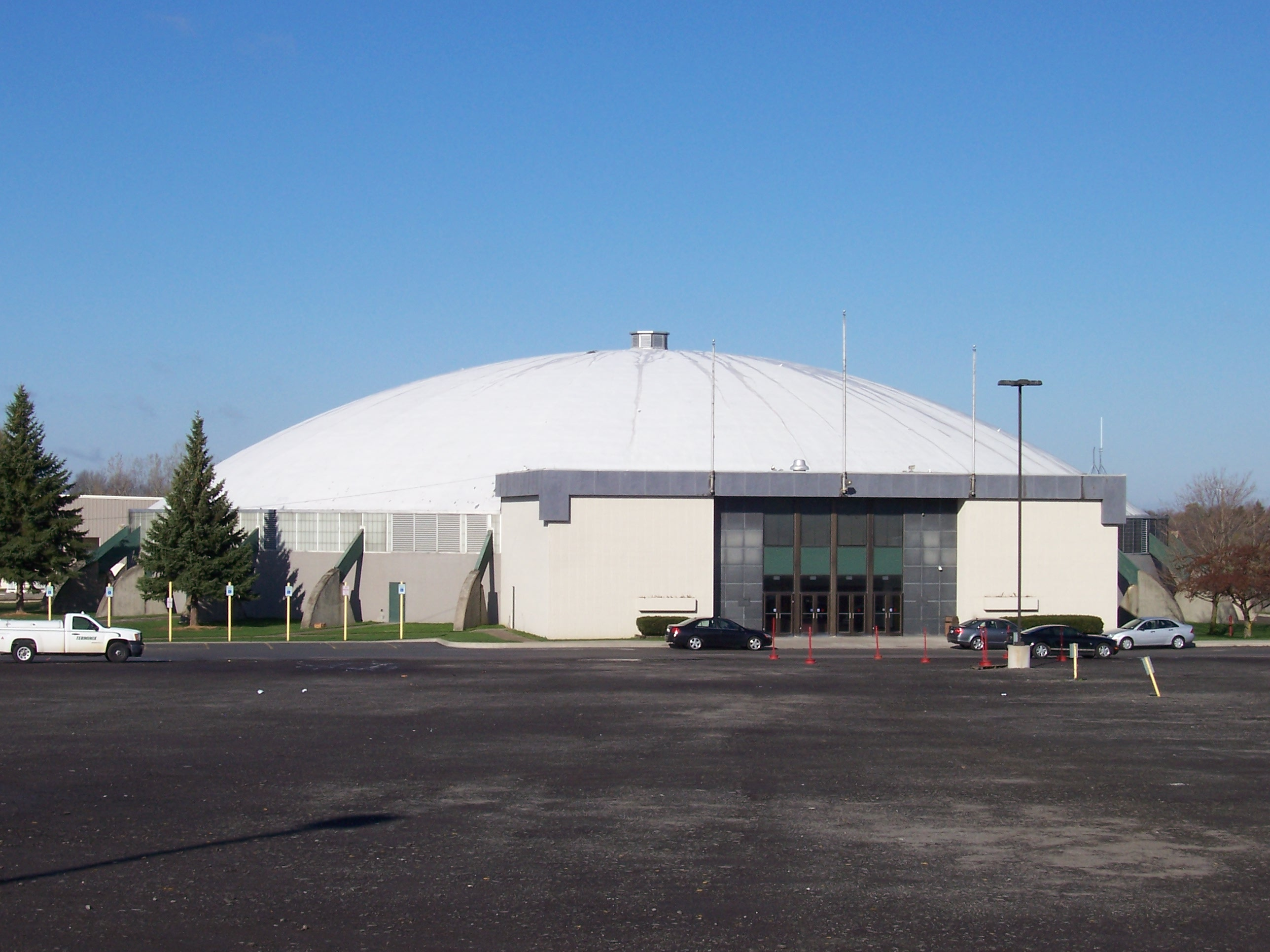
Dome Arena: Front

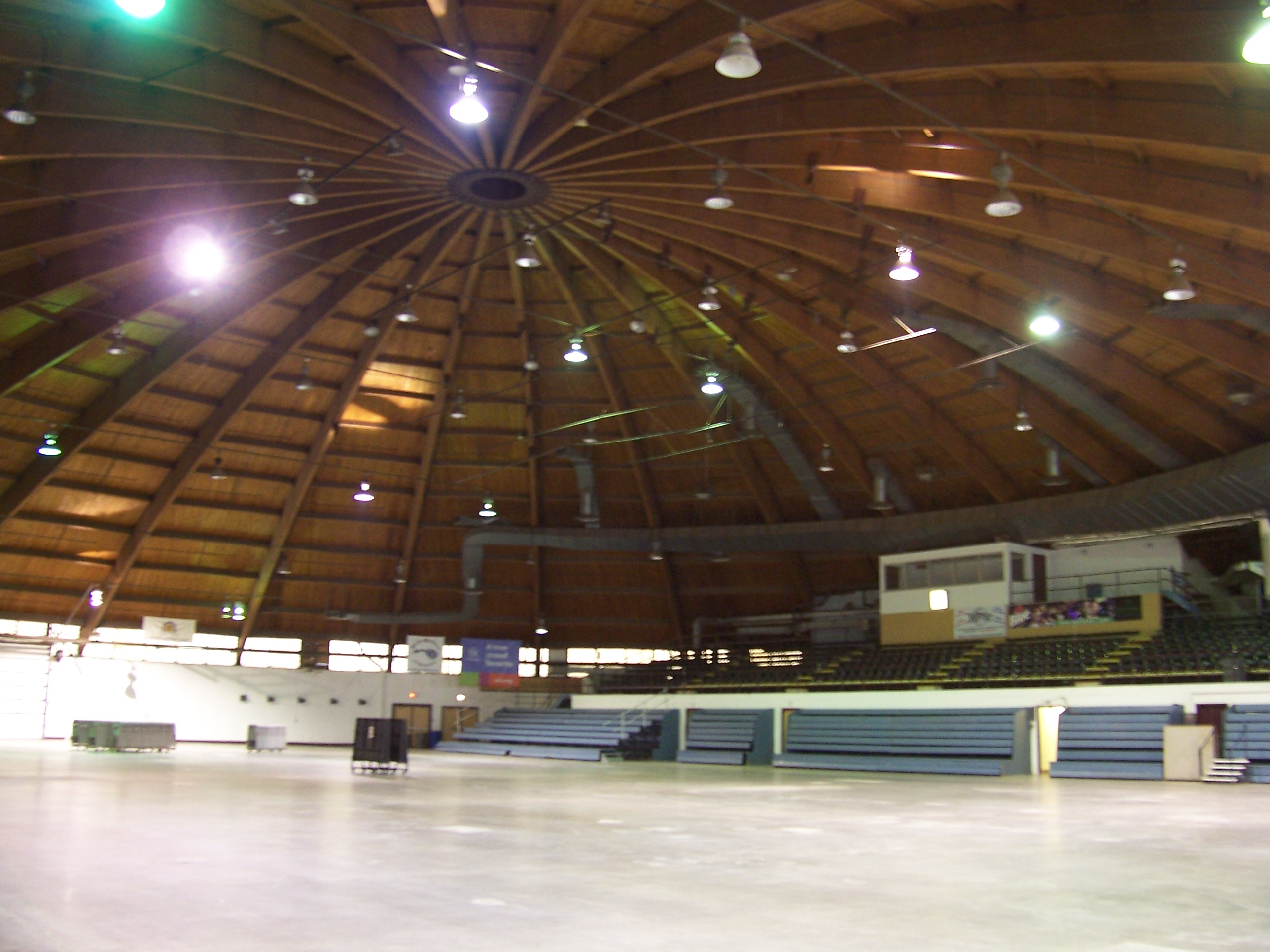
Dome Interior

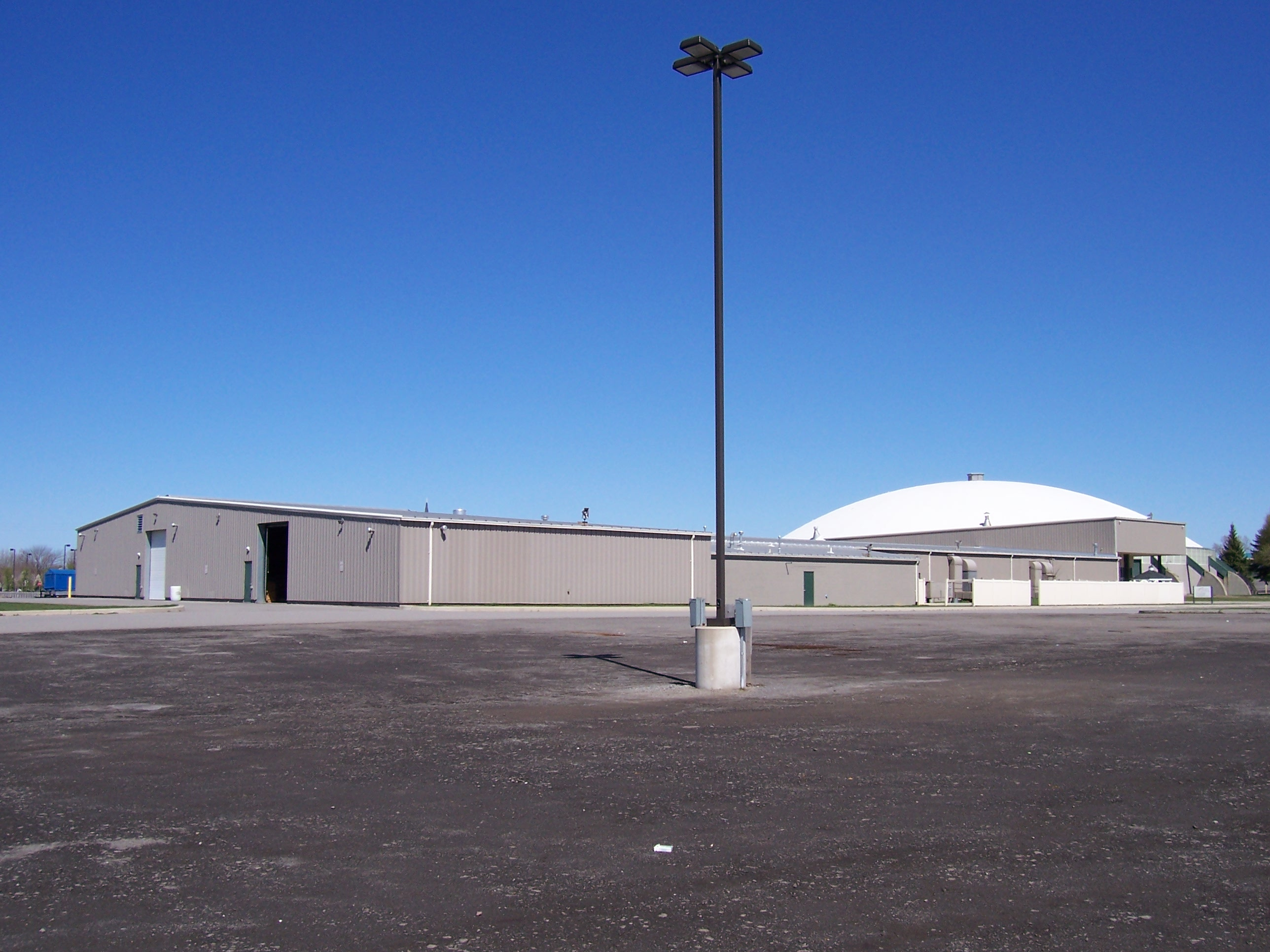
Minett Hall

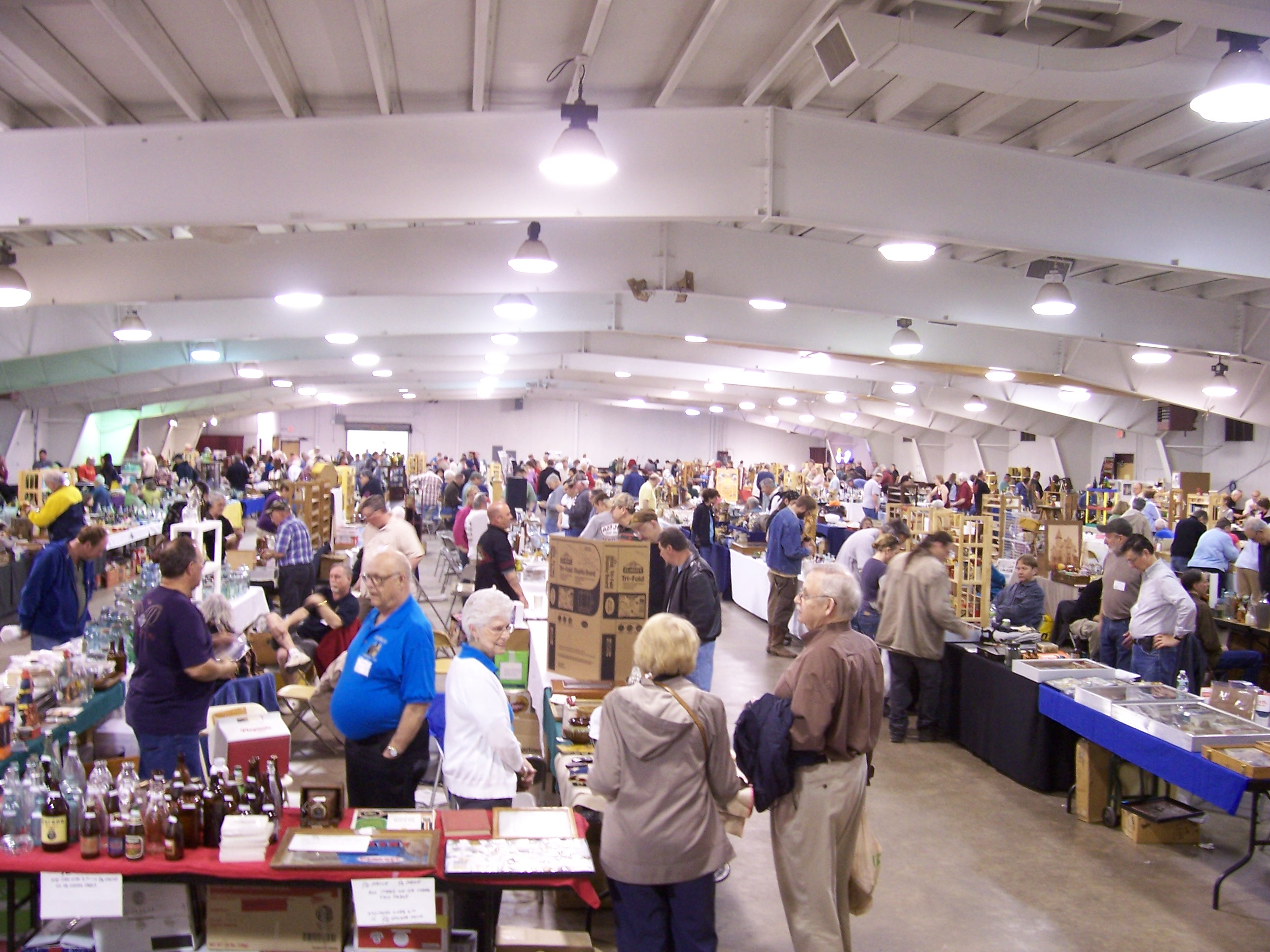
Minett Hall Interior

=== Minett Hall ===
Minett Hall is an exhibit hall with 23,000 square feet (2,100 m^{2}) of exhibit space and capacity of up to 3,000 people. Past uses include banquets, trade shows, conventions and other events.

== Events ==
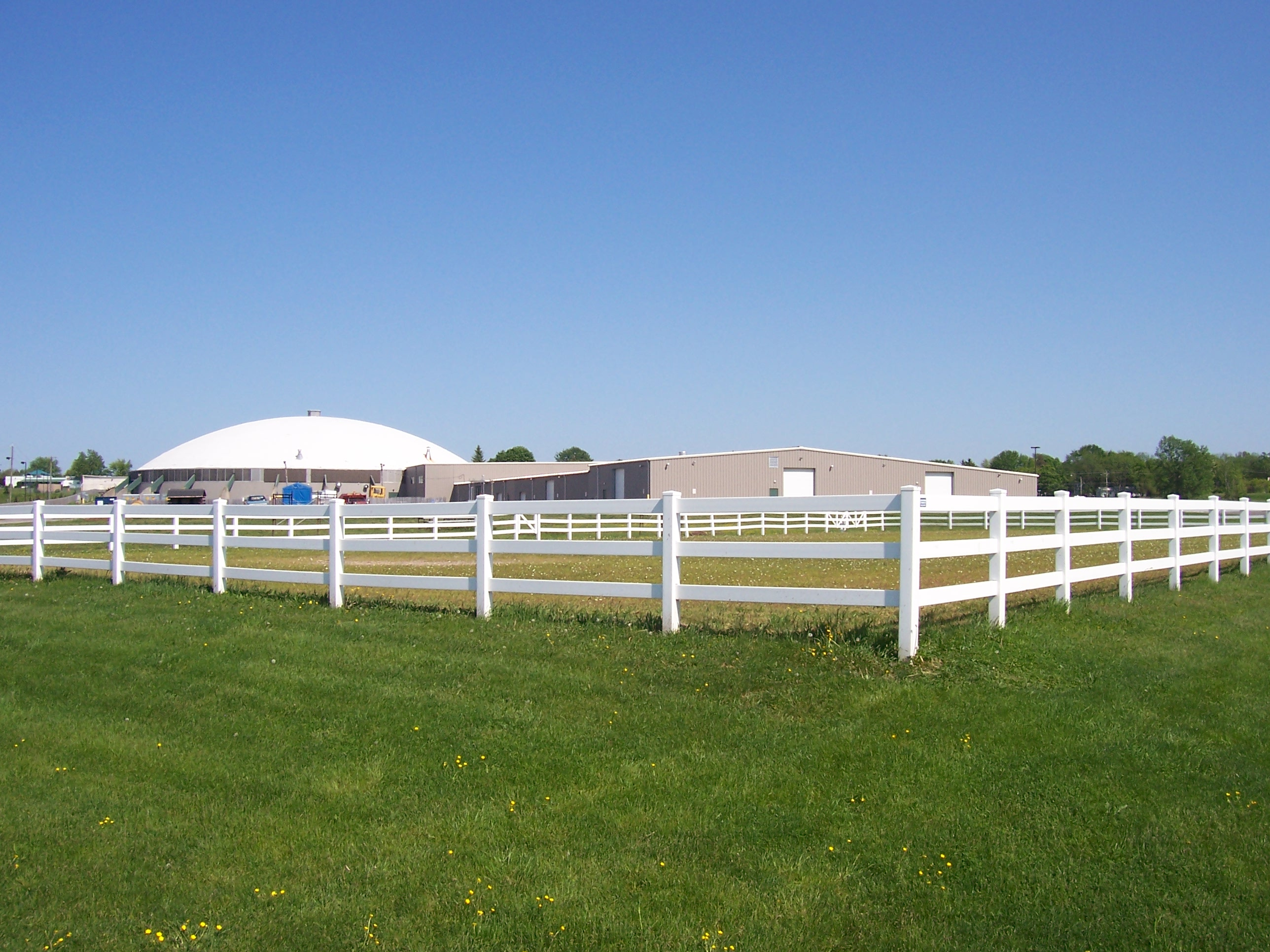
Livestock pen

=== Monroe County Fair ===
The Monroe County Fair Society organized its first fair in 1823, but it wasn’t until 1947 that it was moved to this more permanent location.

The Fair was relocated to Monroe County’s Northampton Park in 2013, and again four years later when fair officials signed a 10-year lease with the Town of Rush. The fair was canceled in 2020 because of the coronavirus pandemic, and attempts to re-establish it later years were unsuccessful.

=== Rock concerts ===
On May 10, 1977, the blues rock band Foghat recorded their double platinum selling album Foghat Live at this arena.

=== Basketball ===
The arena's trademark was the experimental green textile and rubber basketball court, which at the time was billed as the "future of basketball courts", (the "AstroTurf of basketball"). Although it was growing in popularity in Europe, the carpeted playing court never took off as a viable surface in the US, and a generation later "The Rug" remains an icon in the memories of those who recall the Dome Arena's short history as a professional sports venue.

The Dome Arena was the host to one of the most unusual games in basketball history. In January 1979, the Rochester Zeniths were hosting the CBA All-Stars in the league's annual All-Star game. At halftime, a major blizzard knocked out power in western New York, postponing completion of the game until the following evening. Instead of merely completing the game by playing two more quarters, CBA Commissioner Jim Drucker decided that they would continue the game from the point of the blackout, but play an additional four quarters for the new fans in attendance the second night. Thus, that game would be the only game in professional basketball history to feature six complete 12-minute "quarters". The hometown Zeniths won the game, 182–168.

The Zeniths won CBA Championships in 1978–79 and 1980–81 while based out of the Dome Arena.

=== Pickleball club ===
In November 2023 the Dome completed a $500,000 reconfiguration for one singular purpose with 12 tournament-quality pickleball courts filling the circular floor. The ROC Dome Pickleball Club offered lessons and events and hosted tournaments. Other events the Dome previously hosted were transferred to Minett Hall. On July 24, 2024, the Dome Pickleball Club abruptly and permanently ceased operations.

Following the short-lived pickleball era, the Dome Arena was permanently leased to a youth lacrosse organization.

=== Stock car racing ===
Between 1950 and 1958, a one-half mile clay oval on the premises annually hosted Grand National Series (now NASCAR Cup) events, which were won by notable racing pioneers including series champions Tim Flock, Lee Petty, and Herb Thomas.

The NASCAR Sportsman Division competed on a weekly basis throughout the 1950s and early 1960s, eventually appearing only during the annual fair. The last auto race at the venue was sponsored by the Super DIRT Series during the 1981 fair.
