= La Crosse Center =

Arena in downtown La Crosse, Wisconsin

Coordinates: 43°48′45″N 091°15′23″W

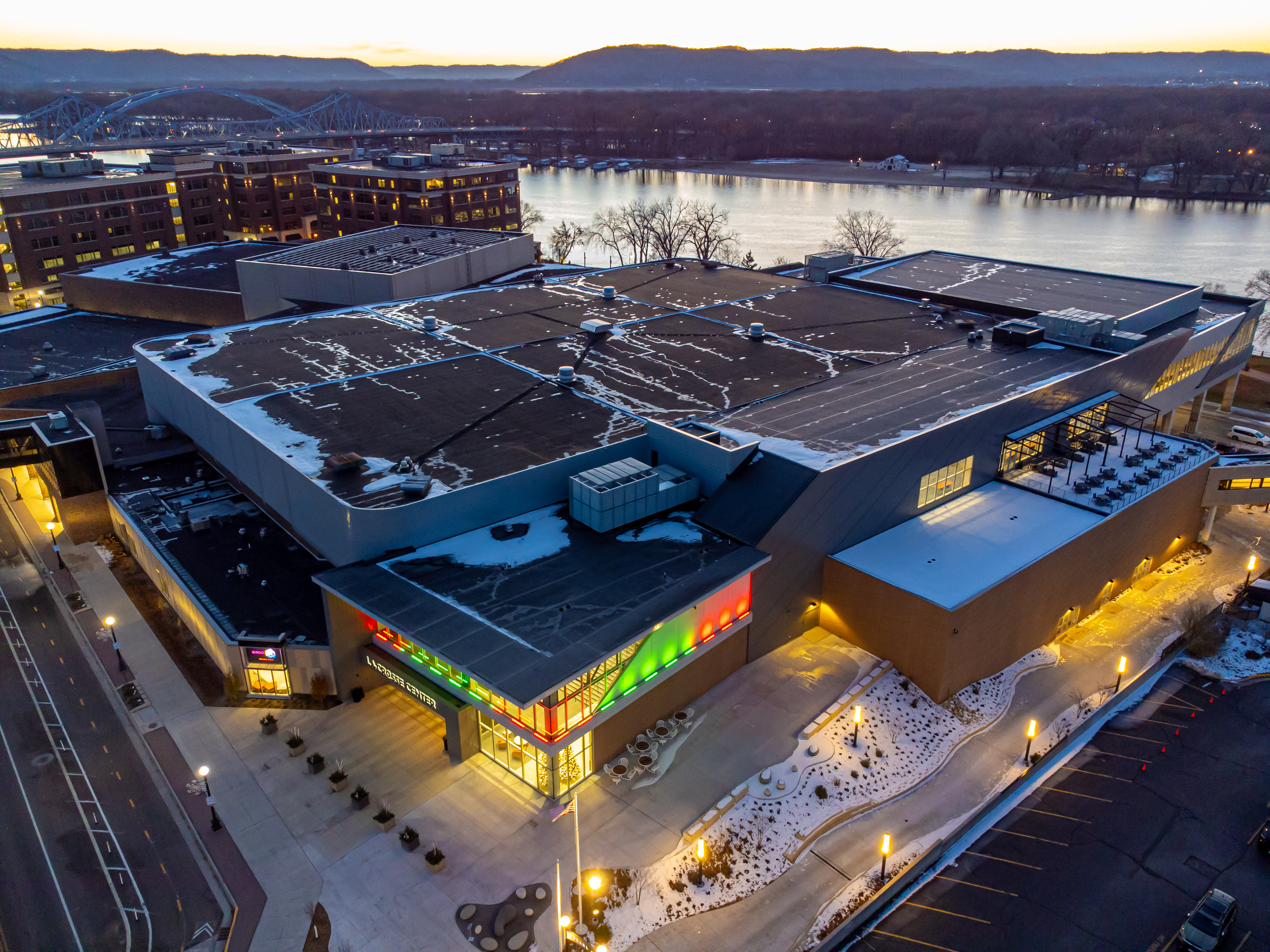
- La Crosse Center entrance
- Interactive map of La Crosse Center
- Location: 300 Harborview Plaza; La Crosse, Wisconsin 54601
- Owner: City of La Crosse
- Capacity: 7,500
- Surface: Multi-surface
- Public transit: MTU: C2

Construction
- Opened: 1980

Tenants
- La Crosse Catbirds (CBA) (1985–1994); La Crosse Bobcats (CBA) (1996–2001); La Crosse River Rats (IFL) (2000); La Crosse Night Train (NIFL) (2002–2003); La Crosse Skating Sirens (WFTDA) (2009–2012); La Crosse Spartans (IFL) (2010–2011); La Crosse Showtime (ABA) (2017–2018)

Website
- www.lacrossecenter.com

The La Crosse Center is a multi-purpose arena in downtown La Crosse, Wisconsin, built in 1980. The arena can seat between 5,000 and 7,500, depending on the type of event.

The center is also a convention center. In addition to the arena, which offers 21,600 square feet (2,010 m^{2}) of exhibit space, two locker rooms, and three dressing rooms, there is 14,935-square-foot (1,388 m^{2}) North Hall, which can open up to the arena to be used in combination; and a 38,740-square-foot (3,599 m^{2}) South Exhibit Hall. All three venues total 75,275 square feet (6,993 m^{2}) of exhibit space. The complex also contains 9,432 square feet (876 m^{2}) of space in five meeting rooms, which can be divided into nine meeting rooms.

While both exhibit halls and the arena are used for trade shows, conventions, meetings and banquets, the arena is also used for sporting events, concerts, circuses, ice shows, and other events.

In addition, the center is home to countless exhibits and shows. One noteworthy event is the annual Bi-State Classic high school wrestling tournament. The center holds ten full-size wrestling mats and up to 55 wrestling squads.

The most recent change to the La Crosse Center was a fifty-foot skywalk spanning over Second Street in downtown La Crosse. The skywalk links a five floor parking ramp with the east end of the convention center.

The La Crosse Center is situated less than 300 feet (91 meters) from the banks of the Mississippi River, and Riverside Park in Downtown La Crosse.

== Tenants ==
The La Crosse Skating Sirens began competing at the La Crosse Center in 2009. The Skating Sirens are a nationally "bouting" women's flat-track roller derby team.

It has previously been home to three indoor football teams: The La Crosse River Rats, the La Crosse Spartans and the La Crosse Night Train; and two Continental Basketball Association (CBA) teams: The La Crosse Catbirds and the La Crosse Bobcats. It most recently housed the La Crosse Showtime of the American Basketball Association. The team began playing the 2018–19 season at the La Crosse Center, but had to move from the facility prior to playing any games in 2019.

The center has fielded bids for additional teams in United Indoor Football, the United States Hockey League, and the NBA Development League.

== Gallery ==
Front entrance

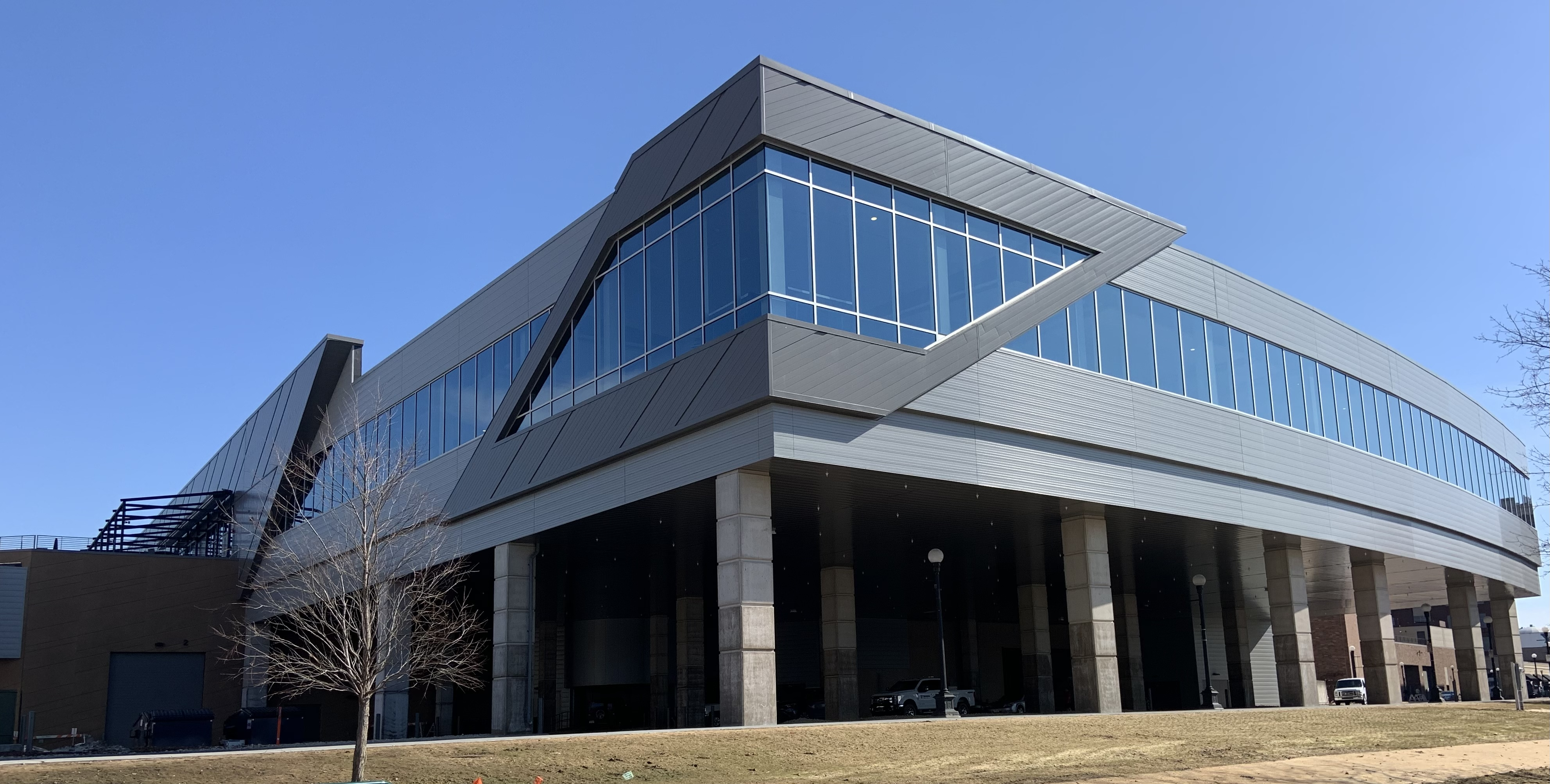
Back

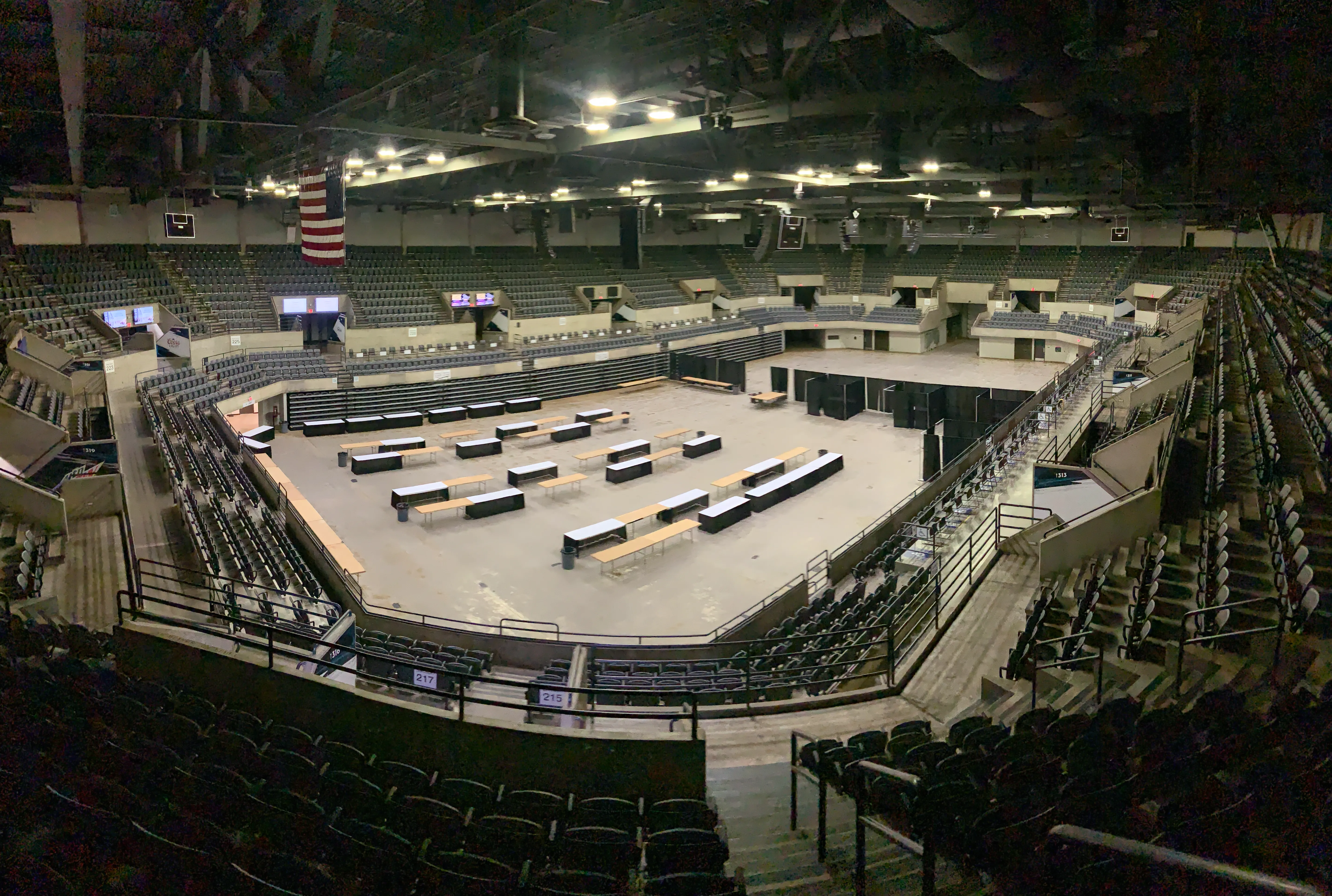
Arena

== See also ==
- Onalaska OmniCenter
