= Grossinger Motors Arena =

Arena in Bloomington, Illinois

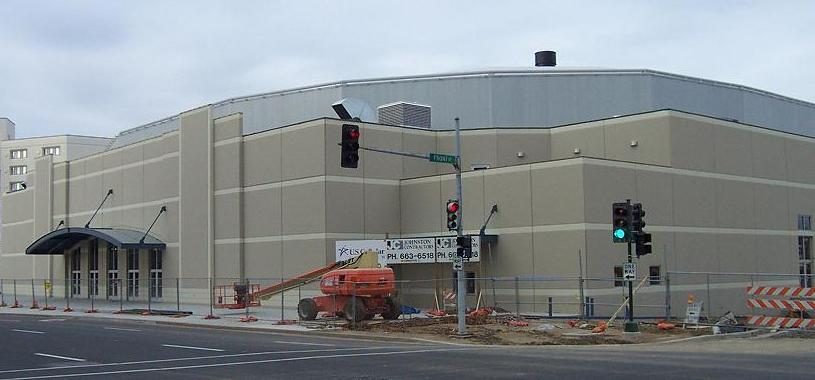
- The building nearing completion in 2005.
- Interactive map of Grossinger Motors Arena
- Former names: U.S. Cellular Coliseum (2006–2016); The Coliseum (2016–2017)
- Location: 101 South Madison Street; Bloomington, Illinois 60701
- Coordinates: 40°28′41″N 88°59′47″W
- Owner: City of Bloomington
- Operator: City of Bloomington
- Capacity: Hockey & Indoor Football: 7,000; Concerts: 8,000
- Surface: Multi-surface
- Public transit: Connect Transit

Construction
- Groundbreaking: August 19, 2004
- Opened: April 1, 2006
- Cost: $37 million ($59.1 million in 2025 dollars)
- Architects: BBB Architects, Ltd.
- Structural engineer: Halcrow Yolles
- Services engineer: The Mitchell Partnership Inc.
- General contractor: Johnston Contractors Inc.

Tenants
- Illinois State Redbirds (MACHA); Bloomington Extreme/Edge (UIF/IFL/CPIFL/X-League/CIF) (2006–2017); Bloomington PrairieThunder (UHL/IHL/CHL) (2006–2011); Bloomington Blaze (CHL) (2011–2013); Bloomington Thunder (SPHL) (2013–2014); Bloomington Flex (PBL/MPBA) (2013–2015); Bloomington Bison (ECHL) (2024–present)

Grossinger Motors Arena (formerly known as U.S. Cellular Coliseum and simply the Coliseum) is an arena in downtown Bloomington, Illinois. It is on the southwest corner of Madison Street (US-51) and Front Street. The arena opened to the public on April 1, 2006.

== Description ==
Its seating capacity is approximately 6,000 for hockey and indoor football games and 7,000+ for concerts. The arena has 800 club seats, 24 luxury suites, and two party suites.

The arena can play host to concerts, live performances, hockey, indoor football and basketball.

The arena annually hosts several graduations for area high schools and Heartland Community College.

Over the years, the venue has hosted concerts from top stars of many music genres, including the likes of Rod Stewart, REO Speedwagon, John Mayer, Jason Aldean, Alan Jackson, Blake Shelton, Luke Bryan, Kenny Chesney, Reba McEntire, Shinedown, Chevelle, Boston, Judas Priest, Chris Stapleton, Keith Urban, Brad Paisley, Eric Church, Luke Combs and many others.

The venue has also held live events such as Monster Jam, Nitro Circus, Disney Live, WWE Wrestling, ice racing, and several other attractions.
