= 2009 UNGL Draft =

The 2009 UNGL Draft was the inaugural draft for the United National Gridiron League. The draft was held on January 8–9, 2009. What made this draft unique was that the league chose to skip having a rookie combine and held the draft online, in order to start the league in the spring of 2009. The first overall selection of the draft was UAB running back Dan Burks by the Alabama Blackbirds. The following is an incomplete list of players selected in the 2009 UNGL Draft.

== Players included in the draft ==
Included in the draft where players from other leagues, such as the All-American Football League (AAFL), Arena Football League (AFL), American Indoor Football Association (AIFA), Continental Indoor Football League (CIFL), arenafootball2 (af2), Indoor Football League (IFL), and some from practice squads of National Football League (NFL) franchises.

== Draft by position ==
=== Quarterback ===
Player	Team	College
Shane Boyd	Georgia Stallions	Kentucky
Omar Haugabook	Alabama Dragons	Troy
Brandon Kirsch	Akron Dogs	Purdue
Drew Olson	Virginia Senators	UCLA
Cole Stinson	Miami Flare	Eastern Illinois
Matt Bassuener	Dallas Skybolts	Georgetown
Rich Kovalcheck	Louisiana Beasts	Vanderbilt
Mike Potts	Carolina Cyclones	William & Mary
Perry Patterson	Carolina Cyclones	Syracuse
Nick Hill*	Louisiana Beasts	Southern Illinois
Casey Hansen	Dallas Skybolts	Norfolk State
Willie Copeland	Miami Flare	Valdosta State
B. J. Hall	Virginia Senators	Webber International
Brad Roach	Akron Dogs	Catawaba
Bill Ashburn	Alabama Dragons	Louisville
Michael Shea	Georgia Stallions	Navy
Dezzmon Johnson	Georgia Stallions	Clark Atlanta
Aaron Joseph Molisani	Alabama Dragons	Rochester
Marlin McKinney	Akron Dogs	Toledo
Cleveland McCoy	Virginia Senators	South Carolina State
Royal Gill	Miami Flare	Southern Utah
Darwin Pittman	Dallas Skybolts	Southern
John Jacobs	Louisiana Beasts	Catholic University
Joe Procopio	Carolina Cyclones	La Salle
Brent Schaeffer	Carolina Cyclones	Ole Miss
Brett Hall	Louisiana Beasts	Temple
DaVon Vinson	Dallas Skybolts	Northwestern State
Ronnie Banks	Miami Flare	South Florida
Randy Hippeard	Virginia Senators	UVA Wise
Sedale Threatt Jr.	Akron Dogs	Lehigh
Brent Dearmon	Alabama Dragons	Bethel (TN)
Justin Rascati	Georgia Stallions	James Madison

=== Running back ===
Player	Team	College
Dan Burks	Alabama Dragons	UAB
Abdulaun Kuuan II	Akron Dogs	Grambling State
Chad Cook	Virginia Senators	Murray State
Tyrone Moss	Miami Flare	Miami (FL)
Quinton Smith	Dallas Skybolts	Rice
Vashon Pearson	Louisiana Beasts	Mississippi
Darrel Blackman	Carolina Cyclones	NC State
Cassen Jackson-Garrison	Georgia Stallions	Vanderbilt
Quinn Porter	Georgia Stallions	Stillman
Micah Andrews	Carolina Cyclones	Wake Forest
Voncarie Owens	Louisiana Beasts	Ohio
Ronald Drummer	Dallas Skybolts	Duke
Travis Glasford	Miami Flare	Western Illinois
Greg Pruitt	Virginia Senators	North Carolina Central
Joseph Doss	Akron Dogs	Memphis
Eric Gray	Alabama Dragons	Alabama
Tim Blackwell	Alabama Dragons	Southern Mississippi
David Yancy	Akron Dogs	
Kary Fisher	Virginia Senators	
Ryan Grosulak	Miami Flare	
Michael Owens	Dallas Skybolts	Auburn
Michael Franklin	Louisiana Beasts	
Gerald Davis	Carolina Cyclones	
Lorenzo Perry	Georgia Stallions	Bryant
Ra'Shad Morgan	Georgia Stallions	UVA Wise
Bernard Palmer	Carolina Cyclones	
Mark Bonds	Louisiana Beasts	
Shawn Harris	Dallas Skybolts	
Tyler Sherden	Miami Flare	
Derrick Moss	Virginia Senators	
Greg Moore	Akron Dogs	
Darius Fudge	Alabama Dragons	Western Carolina
Jerrell Jones	Alabama Dragons	Rhode Island
Bobby Washington	Akron Dogs	
Adrian Smith	Virginia Senators	
Antonio White	Miami Flare	
Harold Taylor Jr.	Dallas Skybolts	Houston
Amos Allen	Louisiana Beasts	
Jacob French	Carolina Cyclones	San Jose State
Steven King	Georgia Stallions	
Samuel Dawson	Dallas Skybolts	Cal State Fullerton

=== Fullbacks ===
Player	Team	College
Matt Hahn	Louisiana Beasts	
De'Angelo Bryant*	Carolina Cyclones	Wake Forest
Qutrell Payton	Georgia Stallions	
Terrance Freeney	Alabama Dragons	Northern Iowa
Chris Manderino	Akron Dogs	California
Carlton Weatherford	Virginia Senators	Virginia Tech
Christopher Edwards	Miami Flare	North Carolina Central
Orlando Medlock Jr.*	Dallas Skybolts	Utah
Jon Helmandollar	Dallas Skybolts	Boise State
Dan Ross	Miami Flare	
Brandon Isaiah	Virginia Senators	
DeAnte Jenkins	Akron Dogs	
Laurence Subelka	Alabama Dragons	Avila
Koronna Henderson	Georgia Stallions	
James Gibson	Carolina Cyclones	
Matt Brown	Louisiana Beasts	
George Murray	Louisiana Beasts	
Evans Capers	Carolina Cyclones	
Bryan Beasley	Georgia Stallions	
Marcus Avies	Alabama Dragons	North Alabama
Chase Adams	Akron Dogs	Geneva
David Kennebrew	Miami Flare	
Anthony Morrison	Dallas Skybolts	Houston

* After draft, joined af2.

=== Wide receivers ===
Player	Team	College
Emery Sammons	Virginia Senators	
MacArthur White Jr.	Virginia Senators	Lakeland College
Charles Futrell	Virginia Senators	North Carolina Central
Almonzo Banks	Virginia Senators	
Brent Johnson	Virginia Senators	
Phillip Taylor	Virginia Senators	
Ryan Bugg	Virginia Senators	
Rod Harper	Virginia Senators	Murray State
Jakari Wallace	Dallas Skybolts	Minnesota
Brandon Turner	Dallas Skybolts	Liberty
Fredric Howze, III	Dallas Skybolts	Frostburg State
Corey Ready	Dallas Skybolts	Catawba
Brent Craft	Dallas Skybolts	Georgetown
DaMarcus Davis	Dallas Skybolts	Tulane
Robert Gill	Dallas Skybolts	Texas State
Demetrius Wilibert	Dallas Skybolts	Southeastern Oklahoma State
Andrew Pearman	Akron Dogs	
Allen Jewell	Akron Dogs	
Torrey Lowe	Akron Dogs	Greensboro College
Kenyada Tatum	Akron Dogs	
William Norwood	Akron Dogs	
Juval Winston	Akron Dogs	
Charles Sullivan	Akron Dogs	
Jahkeen Gilmore	Akron Dogs	Indiana
Jason Tomlinson	Carolina Cyclones	
Matt Henry	Carolina Cyclones	
Kenneth Williams	Carolina Cyclones	
Bobby Chase	Carolina Cyclones	
James Finley	Carolina Cyclones	
Corey Bundy	Carolina Cyclones	
Nathan Forse	Carolina Cyclones	
Anthony Jones	Carolina Cyclones	
Kenny Higgins	Carolina Cyclones	Toledo
Akilah Lacey	Louisiana Beasts	Idaho State
Alan Turner	Louisiana Beasts	Southern Illinois
Greg Betterson	Louisiana Beasts	
James Lukowiak	Louisiana Beasts	
Jerel Myers	Louisiana Beasts	LSU
Josh Smith	Louisiana Beasts	
Levander Segars	Louisiana Beasts	
Pat McCann	Louisiana Beasts	
Arel Gordon	Georgia Stallions	
Christopher Bocage	Georgia Stallions	
Eric McCain	Georgia Stallions	Glendale CC (AZ)
Errick McCown	Georgia Stallions	
Jarrett Ponder	Georgia Stallions	
Levon Thomas	Georgia Stallions	
Thyron Lewis	Georgia Stallions	Howard
Aaron Love	Miami Flare	
Carlos Ousley	Miami Flare	
Darren Paige	Miami Flare	
Eric Taylor	Miami Flare	
Ervin Dickerson	Miami Flare	TCU
Evan Adams	Miami Flare	
Tavaris Capers	Miami Flare	UCF
Terrence Hall	Miami Flare	
Alvance Robinson	Alabama Dragons	Alabama State
DuVaughn Flagler	Alabama Dragons	Gardner–Webb
Emanuel Hassell	Alabama Dragons	Chattanooga
Mark Moore	Alabama Dragons	MidAmerica Nazarene
Nick Garton	Alabama Dragons	San Diego State
Preston Brown	Alabama Dragons	Tulane
Will Galusha	Alabama Dragons	Hardin–Simmons
Norris Drinkard	Alabama Dragons	UAB

=== Tight ends ===
Player	Team	College
Travis Lewis	Virginia Senators	
Victor Jones	Virginia Senators	
Louis Irizarry	Virginia Senators	
Ryan Heller	Dallas Skybolts	LIU
Keith Schultz	Dallas Skybolts	Western Michigan
Calen Powell	Dallas Skybolts	Duke
Seth Schussler	Akron Dogs	St. Norbert
Chris Hopkins	Akron Dogs	
Pat Cain	Akron Dogs	
Brandon Davis	Carolina Cyclones	
Anthony Fair	Carolina Cyclones	Towson
Marcus Stone	Carolina Cyclones	
Eric Andino	Louisiana Beasts	Michigan State
Joel Gamble	Louisiana Beasts	Shippensburg
Jon Loyte	Louisiana Beasts	Boston College
Charles Giacomarro	Georgia Stallions	Georgia Southern
Kenneth Dickerson	Georgia Stallions	
Chris Conklin	Georgia Stallions	Abilene Christian
James McDonald	Miami Flare	
Jason Krupinski	Miami Flare	Middle Tennessee
Patrick Harrington	Miami Flare	
Todd Mitchell Jr.	Miami Flare	
Curtis Blake	Alabama Dragons	Alabama A&M
Logan Stropko	Alabama Dragons	Chadron State
Rohnie Sykes	Alabama Dragons	Morgan State

=== Offensive line ===
Player	Team	College
Derek Morris	Alabama Dragons	North Carolina State
Leroy Auguste	Alabama Dragons	Buffalo
Jason Lewis	Alabama Dragons	Mount Union
Jake Forshey	Alabama Dragons	Willamette
Jonathon Cruz	Alabama Dragons	Southwestern Oklahoma State
Henry Tells	Alabama Dragons	Troy
Gene Frederic	Alabama Dragons	Memphis
Bruce McCaleb	Alabama Dragons	Delta State

=== Defensive end ===
Player	Team	College
Larry McSwain	Akron Dogs	UAB
David Miller	Virginia Senators	UAB
Edward Jackson	Akron Dogs	Sam Houston
Paul Dumervil	Akron Dogs	Morrisville
Jaymar Johnson	Akron Dogs	Cheyney
Brian Landies	Dallas Skybolts	Malone

=== Defensive tackle ===
Player	Team	College
Alfred Peterson	Akron Dogs	Rutgers
Anthony Richardson	Akron Dogs	Kentucky State
Bo May	Akron Dogs	Delta State
William Knepper	Akron Dogs	Saint Francis
Rudy Griffin	Akron Dogs	Alabama
Darius Davis	Dallas Skybolts	Wayne State
Tyris Rorie	Louisiana Beasts	North Carolina Central

=== Linebacker ===
Player	Team	College
Myles Banford	Alabama Dragons	Youngstown
Michael Alston	Alabama Dragons	Toledo
Donald Thomas	Alabama Dragons	Eastern Illinois
Fernandez Shaw	Alabama Dragons	Alabama A&M
George Lewis	Alabama Dragons	Iowa
David Hicks	Alabama Dragons	Grambling State
Greg Lewis	Alabama Dragons	Iowa
Jonathan Borrero	Louisiana Beasts	Miami Dade College

=== Cornerback ===
Player	Team	College
Keith Camp	Arizona Dragons	Jackson State
Michael Phillips	Arizona Dragons	Pitt
Desmond Foster	Arizona Dragons	Alabama State
Ken Davis	Arizona Dragons	Southwest Baptist
Carl Casey	Arizona Dragons	Stillman
Garrett Majors	Arizona Dragons	Indiana (Penn.)

=== Safety ===
Player	Team	College
Brian Bingnear	Arizona Dragons	Kutztown
Jarvis Johnson	Arizona Dragons	Rutgers
Atcheson Conway	Arizona Dragons	Bowie State
Joe Goosby	Arizona Dragons	Tulane
DeWain Whitmore	Arizona Dragons	Arkansas-Pine Bluff
Derrick Williams	Arizona Dragons	Mary Hardin–Baylor
Mario Ramos	Miami Flare	Harper College

=== Kicker ===
Player	Team	College
Clint Stitser	Arizona Dragons	Fresno State
Deric Yaussi	Arizona Dragons	Wyoming

=== Punter ===
Player	Team	College
Brent Haifman	Arizona Dragons	North Dakota
Dan Huff	Arizona Dragons	Fairleigh Dickinson
Mark Gronzalski		William Penn
Tyler Parry	Georgia Stallions	Malone
