= David Miller (American football) =

American football player (born 1984)

Profile
- Position: Defensive end

Personal information
- Born: June 27, 1984 (age 42)
- Listed height: 6 ft 4 in (1.93 m)
- Listed weight: 260 lb (118 kg)

Career information
- High school: Cullman (AL)
- College: UAB
- NFL draft: 2007: undrafted

Career history
- Arizona Rattlers (2008); Edmonton Eskimos (2009)*; Rio Grande Valley Dorados (2009); New York Sentinels (2009)*
- * Offseason or practice squad member only
- Stats at ArenaFan.com

David Miller is an American former football defensive end. He played college football at UAB. In his professional career, Miller was a member of the Arizona Rattlers, Edmonton Eskimos, Rio Grande Valley Dorados, and New York Sentinels.

== Early life ==
Miller attended Cullman High School in Cullman, Alabama, and was a student and a letterman in football and track. In football, the Alabama Sportswriters Association (ASWA) named him to the All-State Team. As a senior, he was also named to the Birmingham News "Best of the Rest" and rewarded as his team's "Most Valuable Defensive Lineman." Miller played in the North-South All-Star Game after tallying 120 tackles and 22 sacks as a senior. He had 52 career sacks while playing at Cullman.

== College career ==
Miller was redshirted in 2002 as a true freshman at the University of Alabama at Birmingham. When he was there he was a versatile player, who played defensive end, defensive tackle, nose tackle, and linebacker, sometimes all in the same game. His primary position was defensive end, at which he started four years for the UAB Blazers and played in 46 contests.

== Professional career ==
=== Arizona Rattlers ===
Miller was not drafted in the 2007 NFL draft and decided to sign with the Arizona Rattlers of the AFL for the 2008 season. The Rattlers eventually waived him injured after he sustained a shoulder injury that required surgery.

=== UNGL ===
After coming off surgery Miller was the first defensive end selected by the Virginia Senators in the 2009 UNGL Draft, but due to insufficient financial backing the league was unable to get off the ground for its inaugural season.

=== Edmonton Eskimos ===
Miller was signed by the Edmonton Eskimos of the Canadian Football League in May 2009. He was released on June 28, 2009.

=== Rio Grande Valley Dorados ===
After being released by the Eskimos, Miller signed with the Rio Grande Valley Dorados of the AF2, playing the final three games of the season and helping them earn a 2009 playoff berth.

=== New York Sentinels ===
Miller was signed by the New York Sentinels of the United Football League., but was released during the 2009 season.
