= Zac Tubbs =

American football player (born 1984)

Profile
- Position: Offensive line

Personal information
- Born: May 14, 1984 (age 42); Cullman, Alabama, U.S.
- Listed height: 6 ft 6 in (1.98 m)

Career information
- High school: Cullman (AL)
- College: Arkansas

Career history
- Buffalo Bills (2007)*; Team Arkansas (2007)*; Sioux Falls Storm (2009–2010); Allen Wranglers (2012)
- * Offseason or practice squad member only

Awards and highlights
- First-team All-SEC (2006); CFN First-Team All-Bowl Team (2003); Second-team National Senior Offense (2006); Hula Bowl All-Star Game Invitee (2006); Nelson Rainey Award Winner (2007); Second-team All-IFL (2010); Arkansas Democrat-Gazette All-Arkansas SEC Third-team (2017)

Zac Tubbs (born May 14, 1984) is a former Division I athlete who earned athletic honors on the high school, collegiate, and professional level. He was named to the Arkansas Democrat-Gazette's All-Arkansas SEC Third Team on August 6, 2017.

== Early life ==
Tubbs attended Cullman High School in his hometown of Cullman, Alabama. Known for being tremendously strong in the weight room, he garnered nearly every recognition available in his high school career. Named a Gridiron Greats All American and Max Emfinger four-star recruit as a senior, Tubbs was selected to The Birmingham News Super All-State Team, the Alabama Sports Writers Association Super 12 Team, and the Mobile Press-Register Elite 18 Team. The Birmingham News and Alabama Sports Writers Association both tabbed him a first-team Class 5A All-State selection. Tubbs started at left tackle in the Alabama vs. Mississippi All-Star Game Classic. Scout.com listed Tubbs as the No.1 offensive lineman in Alabama while 247 Sports composite rankings listed him as the No.1 OT. Tubbs signed a full scholarship to the University of Arkansas after being recruited by Georgia, Michigan, Notre Dame, Stanford, Alabama, and the Naval Academy. PrepStar on Tubbs: "Tubbs is a gamer. He is very coachable and he learns quick. Zac had 107 pancake blocks and graded out at 93% his senior year. A tremendous pass blocker, Tubbs hasn't allowed a sack his entire high school career."

== College career ==
Tubbs was a four-year letterman and team captain for the University of Arkansas football team. He earned his first career start as a true freshman against Louisiana Lafayette and was only one of two true freshmen to see playing time in the SEC Championship Game against Georgia. As a sophomore, he was named to the College Football News first-team All-Bowl Team after the Hogs beat Missouri in the 2003 Independence Bowl. He started the first five games of his junior season at right tackle and was playing at an All-SEC pace before suffering a severe, season-ending injury. Tubbs was tabbed a preseason second-team All-SEC selection in 2005 and 2006, and was named to the Lon Farrell Academic Honor Roll.

Tubbs earned several first-team All-SEC honors as a senior and CFN placed him on its Top 20 Offensive Tackles list. Newsday Sports sportswriter Alex Abramson selected Tubbs to his second-team National Senior Offense team. He was extended an invitation to play in the Hula Bowl, a post-season All-Star Game, and was the recipient of the Nelson Rainey Award which was given for character and leadership.

"He gives the team extra confidence and toughness when he's on the field. He's got a nasty side to him when it comes down to game day, and can be a vocal guy. There's an air about him that says, 'Hey, we're going to get it done today'. That's why we love having him out there."

— Mike Markuson, Arkansas OL Coach

The Arkansas Democrat-Gazette placed Tubbs on its All-Arkansas SEC Third Team in 2017. The team was composed of Arkansas' best football players since joining the Southeastern Conference. He was also named to HawgBeat.com's "Most underrated Razorbacks in the Rivals.com era" list.

== Professional career ==
Heading into the 2007 NFL Draft, Tubbs was described as being a "strong run-blocking lineman who plays with a nasty attitude", and was ranked in the Top 200 draft eligible prospects in the country (#193). He signed a free agent contract with the Buffalo Bills following the 2007 NFL draft. Following his release from Buffalo, he signed with Team Arkansas in the newly formed All-American Football League. Tubbs spent 2009 and 2010 with the Sioux Falls Storm of the Indoor Football League, where he posted 128 knockdown blocks and earned second-team All-IFL honors in 2010. He signed with the Allen Wranglers of the Indoor Football League in 2012 but retired before the season.

== Athletic pedigree ==
Tubbs' father, Kerry, was a Class 2A All-State basketball player and collegiate All-American who held the Cullman County basketball scoring title for over thirty years. His grandfather, Murry "Stubby" Trimble, was a one-armed All-Southwestern Conference guard at Texas A&M who helped the Aggies claim the SWC Championship in 1956 under Bear Bryant. His great uncle, Wayne Trimble, won two National Championships at the University of Alabama under Bear Bryant and was drafted by the San Francisco 49ers in the fourth round of the 1967 NFL Draft.

== Hall of Fame ==
Tubbs was inducted into the Minor League Football Hall of Fame in 2013 and the Cullman High School Student-Athlete Hall of Fame in 2017.
