= WFMH =

WFMH may refer to:

- WFMH (AM), a radio station (1340 AM) licensed to Cullman, Alabama, United States
- WFMH-FM, a radio station (95.5 FM) licensed to Hackleburg, Alabama, United States
- World Federation for Mental Health, an international organization for the promotion of mental health
