= Virginia Senators =

Virginia Senators may refer to:

== Politicians ==
- United States senators from Virginia, senators representing the commonwealth of Virginia in the United States Senate
- Members of the Virginia Senate, which convenes in Richmond, Virginia

== Sports ==
- Virginia Swarm (also known as the Virginia Senators), team in the defunct United National Gridiron League
