= WKUL =

- Cullman, Alabama; United States
- Broadcast area: Cullman, Alabama
- Frequency: 92.1 MHz
- Branding: Country K-92

Programming
- Format: Country music, talk and sports
- Subchannels: HD2: Christian music
- Affiliations: Fox News Radio; Atlanta Braves

Ownership
- Owner: Jonathan Christian Corp.

History
- First air date: September 1967
- Former call signs: WKLN (1967–1982); WKLN-FM (1982–1988)
- Call sign meaning: Cullman

Technical information
- Licensing authority: FCC
- Facility ID: 31933
- Class: A
- ERP: 6,000 watts
- HAAT: 100 meters (330 ft)
- Transmitter coordinates: 34°11′41″N 86°43′52″W
- Translator: HD2: 98.3 W252EK (Cullman)

Links
- Public license information: Public file; LMS
- Webcast: Listen live Listen live (HD2)
- Website: wkul.com 979praisefm.com (HD2)

WKUL (92.1 FM, "Country K-92") is a commercial radio station licensed to Cullman, Alabama, United States. The station is owned by Jonathan Christian Corp. WKUL airs a full-service country music format plus some talk radio programming,

== History ==
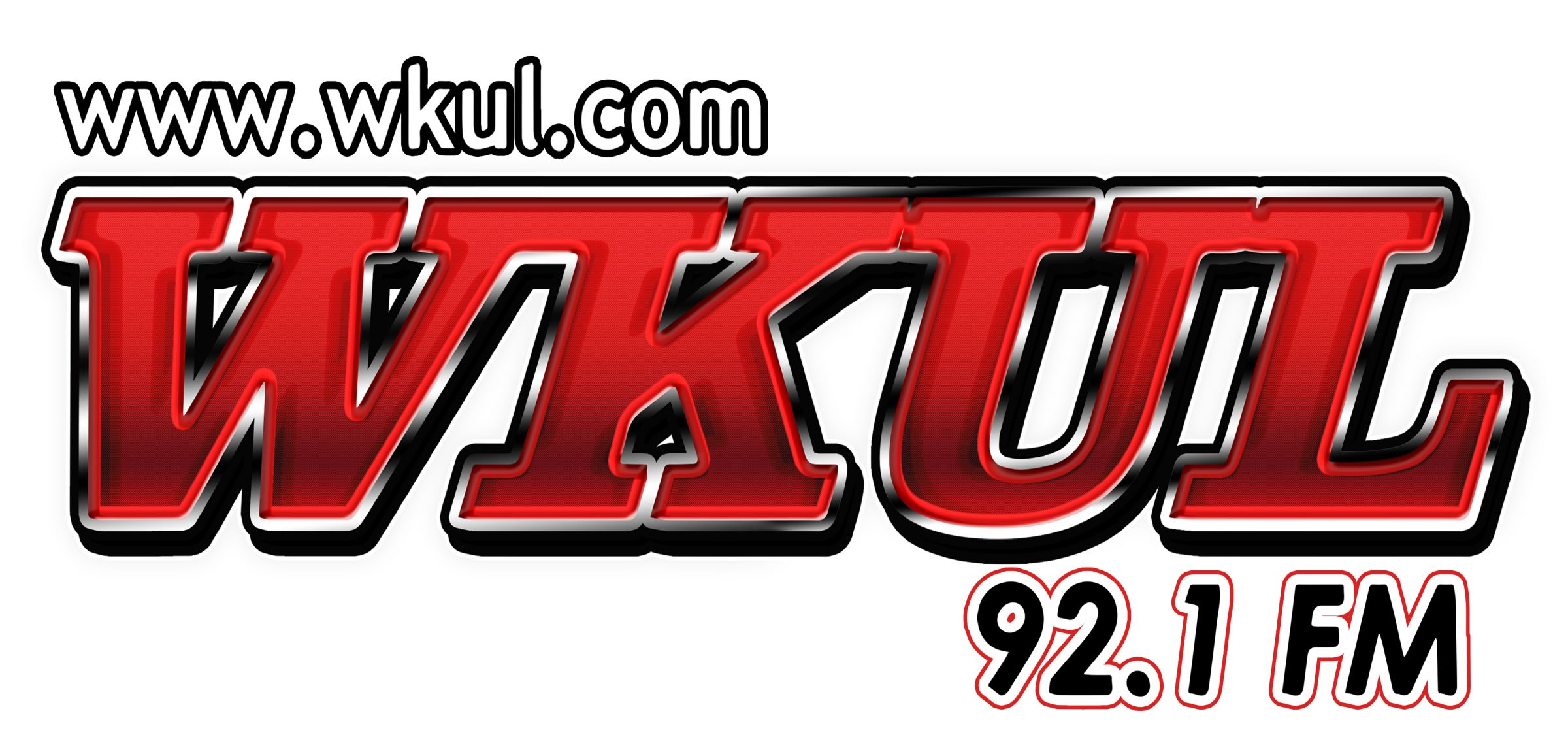
Current WKUL logo

Originally known as WKLN, this station signed on in September 1967 at 92.1 MHz with 3,000 watts of effective radiated power under the ownership of Kenneth E. Lawrence. In the late 1970s, WKLN was sold to the Jonathan Christian Corporation, run by Jeffrey Liebensberger and Robert Haa. The station shifted to callsign WKLN-FM on January 21, 1982.

In April 1980, Robert Conrad Haa agreed to sell control of station licensee Jonathan Christian Corporation to Donald Houston Mosley. The deal was approved by the Federal Communications Commission on July 7, 1980.

The station was assigned the current WKUL call letters by the FCC on February 1, 1988. The WKUL callsign originally entered the Cullman market when 1340 AM (now WFMH) went on the air on October 1, 1946.

In 1996 the station increased power to 6000 watts erp

In November 2006, Don Mosley made a deal to sell his controlling interest in Jonathan Christian Corporation, the licensee for this station, to Ron Mosley. The deal was approved by the FCC on December 28, 2006, and the transaction was consummated on March 1, 2007. At the conclusion of this deal, Ron Mosley owned 100% of the shares in Jonathan Christian Corp.

In the spring of 2017, the station added an HD signal and launched a gospel music format via translator W250BM (now W252EK) in Cullman, as "Praise 98.3 and WKUL 92.1 HD2". (Taken from Alabama Broadcast Media Page)

== On-air personalities ==
- Ron Mosley Jr.
- Ron Mosley Sr.
- Tim Dobson,
- Big D & Bubba
- Clay Travis and Buck Sexton
- Johnny "Flash" Thornton
- Rich Jesse (sports)
- Pete Kirby (sports)
- Ken Burcham (sports)

== Past personalities ==
- Grant Smith (deceased)
- George Spear
- Gus Slaten
- Dave Cooper (who later moved to Hollywood and became an actor, appearing in numerous movies and network TV shows, including over two years on The West Wing, a hit NBC series in which he played a White House aide under the pseudonym "David Cubero")
- Matthew Miller
- Anthony Quattlebaum
- Shannon Quattlebaum
- Mark Albritton
- Jill Harelson
- Steffany Means
- Eddie Mack ("The Mouth of the South")
- Ray Mosley
- Christian Ballard
