= Thyron Lewis =

American football player and coach (born 1982)

No. 5, 6
- Position: Wide receiver

Personal information
- Born: November 25, 1982 (age 43)
- Listed height: 6 ft 4 in (1.93 m)
- Listed weight: 200 lb (91 kg)

Career information
- High school: Westchester (Los Angeles)
- College: Howard
- NFL draft: 2006: undrafted

Career history
- Stockton Lightning (2008); Tri-Cities Fever (2008); Bossier–Shreveport Battle Wings (2009); Tri-Cities Fever (2010); Cleveland Gladiators (2011–2014); Los Angeles KISS (2015); Cleveland Gladiators (2015–2016); Jacksonville Sharks (2017); Atlanta/Carolina Havoc (2018–2019); Carolina Cobras (2021); Louisiana VooDoo (2024)

Awards and highlights
- NAL champion (2017); AAL champion (2018); Second-team All-IFL (2010)

Career AFL statistics
- Receptions: 356
- Receiving yards: 5,239
- Receiving TDs: 95
- Rushing TDs: 2
- Tackles: 42
- Stats at ArenaFan.com

Thyron Lewis (born November 25, 1982) is an American former professional football wide receiver. He played college football at Howard University. He was a member of the Stockton Lightning, Tri-Cities Fever, Bossier–Shreveport Battle Wings, Cleveland Gladiators, Los Angeles KISS, Jacksonville Sharks, Atlanta/Carolina Havoc, Carolina Cobras, and Louisiana VooDoo. Lewis was also drafted by Team Tennessee in the supplemental 2008 AAFL draft and by the Georgia Stallions in the 2009 UNGL Draft.

== Early life ==
Lewis attended William H. Taft High School in Woodland Hills, California.

== College career ==
Lewis recorded 30 receptions for 513 yards and four touchdowns for the Howard Bison from 2004 to 2005.

== Professional career ==
Lewis played for the Stockton Lightning of the af2 in 2008. He recorded 28 receptions for 384 yards and 6 touchdowns for the Lightning. He was traded to the af2's Tri-Cities Fever for future considerations in May 2008.

Lewis spent the 2009 season with the Bossier–Shreveport Battle Wings of the af2.

Lewis played for the Tri-Cities Fever of the Indoor Football League (IFL) in 2010. He recorded 50 receptions for 675 yards and 25 touchdowns in 13 games, earning second-team All-IFL honors.

Lewis was assigned to Cleveland Gladiators of the AFL on October 8, 2010. He recorded 97 receptions for a team-leading 1,430 yards and 26 touchdowns in 2013.

On October 28, 2014, Lewis was assigned to the Los Angeles KISS. He was placed on recallable reassignment on May 27, 2015.

On June 4, 2015, Lewis was assigned to the Gladiators.

On January 26, 2017, Lewis signed with the Jacksonville Sharks, who had moved to the National Arena League (NAL).

Lewis signed with the Atlanta Havoc of the American Arena League (AAL) in December 2017. He played for the Havoc from 2018 to 2019.

In September 2020, Lewis signed with the Carolina Cobras of the NAL.

Lewis signed with the Louisiana VooDoo of the new Arena Football League in 2024.

== Coaching career ==
Lewis spent time as the wide receivers coach at Edward Waters University.
