= List of Southern Illinois Salukis in the NFL draft =

This is a list of Southern Illinois Salukis football players in the NFL draft.

== Key ==
B	Back	K	Kicker	NT	Nose tackle
C	Center	LB	Linebacker	FB	Fullback
DB	Defensive back	P	Punter	HB	Halfback
DE	Defensive end	QB	Quarterback	WR	Wide receiver
DT	Defensive tackle	RB	Running back	G	Guard
E	End	T	Offensive tackle	TE	Tight end

== Selections ==
Year	Round	Overall	Player	Team	Position	Notes
1955	28	326	Bob Ems	Chicago Cardinals	B	
1956	30	356	Wayne Williams	New York Giants	E	
1959	19	224	Carver Shannon	Los Angeles Rams	B	
1961	3	38	Houston Antwine	Detroit Lions	G	
1962	8	109	Frank Imperiale	Detroit Lions	G	
1962	10	130	John Longmeyer	Dallas Cowboys	G	
1962	20	270	Amos Bullocks	Dallas Cowboys	B	
1963	8	109	Dennis Harmon	Chicago Bears	DB	
1969	4	102	Bob Hudspeth	New Orleans Saints	T	
1969	13	316	Chuck Benson	Cincinnati Bengals	WR	
1969	13	337	Carl Mauck	Baltimore Colts	LB	
1972	1	3	Lionel Antoine	Chicago Bears	T	
1972	11	279	Tom Laputka	San Francisco 49ers	DE	
1973	9	223	Bill Story	Kansas City Chiefs	DT	
1977	6	167	Andre Herrera	Kansas City Chiefs	RB	
1980	2	49	Kevin House	Tampa Bay Buccaneers	WR	
1983	4	102	John Harper	Atlanta Falcons	LB	
1984	2	48	Rick Johnson	Los Angeles Rams	QB	
1984	1	22	Terry Taylor	Seattle Seahawks	DB	
1986	4	87	Tom Baugh	Kansas City Chiefs	C	
1987	4	97	Ralph Van Dyke	Atlanta Falcons	T	
1992	12	324	Tom Roth	Los Angeles Raiders	G	
1997	5	147	Damon Jones	Jacksonville Jaguars	TE	
2005	4	110	Brandon Jacobs	New York Giants	RB	
2010	6	180	Deji Karim	Jacksonville Jaguars	RB	
2011	7	207	Korey Lindsey	Cincinnati Bengals	DB	
2015	5	143	MyCole Pruitt	Minnesota Vikings	TE	
2020	2	64	Jeremy Chinn	Carolina Panthers	DB	

== Notable undrafted players ==
Note: No drafts held before 1920

Debut year	Player name	Position	Debut NFL/AFL team	Notes
1959	Marion Rushing	LB	Chicago Cardinals	—
1964	Ernie Wheelwright	FB	New York Giants	—
1966	Jim Hart	QB	St. Louis Cardinals	—
1973	Michael Kaczmarek	LB	Baltimore Colts	—
1987	Fabray Collins	LB	Minnesota Vikings	—
1987	Rick Spielman	LB	San Diego Chargers	—
1987	Sebron Spivey	WR	Dallas Cowboys	—
1988	Dave Smith	T	Cincinnati Bengals	—
1991	Martin Hochertz	DE	Seattle Seahawks	—
1993	Yonel Jourdain	RB	Buffalo Bills	—
2002	Bart Scott	LB	Baltimore Ravens	—
2007	Arkee Whitlock	RB	Minnesota Vikings	—
2008	Nick Hill	QB	Chicago Bears	—
2008	Alan Turner	WR	New York Jets	—
2011	Stephen Franklin	LB	Cincinnati Bengals	—
2012	Jewel Hampton	RB	San Francisco 49ers	—
2013	Kenneth Boatright	DT	Seattle Seahawks	—
2013	Jayson DiManche	LB	Cincinnati Bengals	—
2014	Ray Agnew III	FB	Cleveland Browns	—
2017	Chase Allen	LB	Miami Dolphins	—
2018	Craig James	DB	Minnesota Vikings	—
2018	Ryan Neal	S	Philadelphia Eagles	—
2020	Madre Harper	CB	Las Vegas Raiders	—
2022	Bryce Notree	LB	Washington Commanders	—
2024	P. J. Jules	S	Cincinnati Bengals	—
