= Drew Olson =

American football player (born 1983)

No. 7, 8, 10
- Position: Quarterback

Personal information
- Born: April 6, 1983 (age 43); San Francisco, California, U.S.
- Listed height: 6 ft 2 in (1.88 m)
- Listed weight: 222 lb (101 kg)

Career information
- High school: Piedmont (Piedmont, California)
- College: UCLA
- NFL draft: 2006: undrafted

Career history
- Baltimore Ravens (2006–2007)*; Amsterdam Admirals (2007); Carolina Panthers (2007); San Francisco 49ers (2007)
- * Offseason or practice squad member only

Awards and highlights
- Second-team All-Pac-10 (2005)

Drew Martin Olson (born April 6, 1983) is an American former professional football player who was a quarterback in the National Football League (NFL) and NFL Europe. He played college football for the UCLA Bruins. Olson was signed by the Baltimore Ravens as an undrafted free agent in 2006. He was also a member of the Carolina Panthers and San Francisco 49ers, but never appeared in a regular-season game.

== Early life ==
Olson grew up in the affluent town of Piedmont, California, where he was the starting quarterback for the Piedmont Highlanders and gave the small school serious attention in the state, and even national spectacle, especially when he threw to All-Conference receiver, Pete Schneider. Olson led Piedmont to the Bay Shore League championship and was named to the 1st-team All-Bay Shore League team in 2000 and 2001. Olson was also the Bay Shore League Most Valuable Player as a junior. A 3-year starter, Olson completed 439 of 774 passes (57%) for 6,103 yards, 60 touchdowns and 29 interceptions. Olson also demonstrated his athletic talent on the baseball diamond where he played catcher for the Highlanders. Olson became regarded as the top quarterback in the state, No. 6 in the west, No. 16 in the nation, earning four varsity letters, and moved Piedmont High School into the top 10 in the state among small schools.

== College career ==
After graduation from Piedmont High School, Olson enrolled at UCLA. In his freshman year Olson started five games in the second half of the season due to Cory Paus' separated shoulder injury in a game against Cal that sidelined him for four games. For his spectacular performance in five games in 2002, Olson earned the starting job in 2003. In 2003, he appeared in twelve of the thirteen games, nine of which he was the starter for. He completed 173 of 325 passes (53.2%) for 2,067 yards with 10 touchdowns and nine interceptions, as UCLA won two fewer games than the previous year, going 6–7. In Olson's junior season, he, his stats, and the Bruins themselves exploded. As the starter in all 12 games, Olson completed 196 of 341 passes (57.5%) for 2,565 yards, 20 touchdowns and 13 interceptions (four on deflections). In 2005, his senior season, Olson completed 242 of 378 passes (64.0%) for 3,198 yards, with 34 touchdowns and only 6 interceptions. Olson began to make national headlines, and was widely considered the most underrated quarterback in the nation, as UCLA went 10–2 and finished as the 17th ranked team in the country. During his senior season Olson led UCLA to four 4th-quarter double-digit comebacks plus a 22-point rally in the Vitalis Sun Bowl against Northwestern. He threw five touchdowns to rally the team past Washington State, and then passed for six touchdowns the following week against Oregon State to break Cade McNown's single-game school record. His 11 touchdowns in two consecutive games broke Wayne Cook's school record of eight set in 1993. Olson also broke Cook's three-game record (11) with 13.

Olson ended his career at UCLA 2nd on the UCLA all-time passing yardage list (8,532), completions (664) and TDs (67) in his 4-year Bruins career.

Olson graduated from UCLA with a bachelor's degree in history in 2009.

== Professional career ==
Pre-draft measurables
Height	Weight	Arm length	Hand span	40-yard dash	10-yard split	20-yard split	20-yard shuttle	Three-cone drill	Vertical jump	Broad jump
6 ft 1 5/8 in (1.87 m)	222 lb (101 kg)	31 in (0.79 m)	8 3/4 in (0.22 m)	5.12 s	1.81 s	2.99 s	4.42 s	7.64 s	23.0 in (0.58 m)	8 ft 1 in (2.46 m)
All values from NFL Combine/Pro Day

=== Baltimore Ravens ===
After going undrafted in the 2006 NFL draft, Olson signed a non-guaranteed contract as an undrafted free agent with the Baltimore Ravens on May 12, 2006. Olson was cut by the Ravens prior to the start of the 2006 NFL season, but signed to their practice squad. Olson was allocated to now defunct NFL Europa where he played the 2007 season as the starting quarterback of the Amsterdam Admirals. He finished the NFL Europa season having completed 170 out of 310 passes (54.8% completion percentage) for 1967 yards, 13 Touchdowns, and 13 Interceptions.

=== Carolina Panthers ===
In October 2007, Olson was signed to the Carolina Panthers practice squad in the wake of a number of injuries at the quarterback position. He was elevated to the 53-man roster before the team's November 11 game against the Atlanta Falcons. He was subsequently cut the week following the game.

=== San Francisco 49ers ===
On November 21, 2007, Olson was signed to the San Francisco 49ers' practice squad. He was signed to the team's active roster on December 28, where he finished the season. On July 7, 2008, the 49ers waived Olson in order to make room for quarterback Kyle Wright, who was claimed off waivers from the Minnesota Vikings.

=== UNGL ===
On January 8, 2009, he was drafted by the Virginia Swarm in the inaugural draft of the United National Gridiron League. The UNGL has since been dissolved, owing to financial difficulties and lack of interest.
