= Roger Hallmark =

American singer-songwriter

Roger Hallmark (August 9, 1946 – November 29, 2014) was an American country music singer from Cullman, Alabama; he actively recorded from the early 1970s until the early 1980s.

His work was done in Birmingham, Alabama, and included an album of fight songs for the Crimson Tide Football team entitled "Alabama Football Songs." His best known work is "Bear," a tribute song to the late football coach of the University of Alabama's Crimson Tide, Paul "Bear" Bryant.

In the late 1970s, he had a minor hit with the song "A Message to Khomeini". His other political satire songs include "Pluck Kahdaffy Duck" and "You Don't Mess with Uncle Sam".
