= WFMH-FM =

- Hackleburg, Alabama; United States
- Broadcast area: Hamilton, Alabama
- Frequency: 95.5 MHz
- Branding: Big 95.5

Programming
- Format: Country
- Affiliations: Paul Finebaum

Ownership
- Owner: T & T Communications Inc

History
- First air date: May 20, 1994 (95.5 FM)
- Former call signs: WCOC (1994–1996); WXXR-FM (1996–1998)

Technical information
- Licensing authority: FCC
- Facility ID: 24578
- Class: A
- ERP: 6,000 watts
- HAAT: 98 meters (322 ft)
- Transmitter coordinates: 34°16′52.9″N 87°49′30.5″W

Links
- Public license information: Public file; LMS
- Webcast: Listen live
- Website: big955.com

WFMH-FM (95.5 FM, "Big 95.5") is a radio station licensed to serve Hackleburg, Alabama, United States. The station is owned by T & T Communications Inc. It airs a country music format and features programming from The Paul Finebaum Radio Network.

== History ==
The callsign WFMH-FM was originally used by 101.1 FM in Cullman, Alabama when it first went on the air in March 1950. This station is now WXJC-FM, the call letters having been changed by former owner Eddins Broadcasting Co.

The callsign WFMH-FM was assigned to the current 95.5 FM in 1998. This station was granted its original construction permit by the Federal Communications Commission on December 12, 1993. The new station was assigned call letters WCOC on May 20, 1994. The call letters were changed to WXXR-FM on August 9, 1996. After one extension, WXXR-FM received its license to cover from the FCC on September 3, 1996. The station was assigned the current WFMH-FM call letters by the FCC on November 22, 1998.

In May 2004, Voice of Cullman LLC (Clark P. Jones, member/manager) agreed to transfer the license for WFMH-FM and WFMH (1340 AM) to Williams Communications (Walton E. Williams Jr., president/director). The two stations sold for a reported total of $2.45 million.

In August 2004, the station received authorization to change its city of license from Holly Pond, Alabama, to Hackleburg, Alabama. At the time of the move, the station was a longtime affiliate of Westwood One’s Real Country satellite format. The move began in June 2005, completed the move in August 2005, and the station received its latest license to cover in November 2005.

On December 21, 2009, WFMH-FM was sold to T & T Communications Inc for a reported sale of $150,000.
