= Cullman City Schools =

School district in Alabama

Coordinates: 34°10′34.54″N 86°50′50.97″W

Location
- 301 1st St NE Suite 100 Cullman, Alabama 35055 Alabama United States

District information
- Type: Public
- Grades: PK–12
- Established: 1908
- Superintendent: Kyle Kallhoff
- Schools: 7
- Budget: $37.989 million (2020–21)
- NCES District ID: 0100990

Students and staff
- Students: 3,226 (2022–23)
- Teachers: 188.45 (FTE)
- Staff: 144.10 (2022–23)
- Athletic conference: AHSAA Class 6A
- Colors: Black, Gold, and White

Other information
- Website: www.cullmancats.net

The Cullman City Board of Education is composed of schools that serve the city of Cullman, Alabama, US. As of 2022, there were 3,226 students enrolled in Cullman City Schools.

Its boundary is the majority of the city.

== Schools ==
- Cullman City Head Start
- Cullman City Primary School
- East Elementary School
- West Elementary School
- Cullman Middle School
- Cullman High School
- Turning Point (Cullman City Alternative School)
