= WMCJ =

Simulcasting WFMH Cullman
- Cullman, Alabama; United States
- Frequency: 1460 kHz
- Branding: Sports 1340

Programming
- Format: Sports

Ownership
- Owner: Jimmy Dale Media, LLC
- Sister stations: WFMH

History
- First air date: March 25, 1950 (as WFMH at 1300)
- Last air date: September 2024
- Former call signs: WFMH (1950–2002)
- Former frequencies: 1300 kHz (1950–1955)

Technical information
- Licensing authority: FCC
- Facility ID: 70451
- Class: B
- Power: 5,000 watts (day); 500 watts (night)
- Transmitter coordinates: 34°10′44.4″N 86°51′58″W

Links
- Public license information: Public file; LMS

WMCJ (1460 AM) was a radio station licensed to serve Cullman, Alabama, United States. The station was owned by Jimmy Dale Media, LLC.

WMCJ was broadcasting a sports format, simulcasting WFMH (1340 AM).

== History ==
This station began broadcast operations as WFMH, transmitting with 1,000 watts of daytime-only power on an assigned frequency of 1300 kHz, on March 25, 1950. The station was licensed to The Voice of Cullman and was owned in part and operated by B.C. Eddins.

In 1955, the station moved to 1460 kHz to accommodate a power increase to 5,000 watts, still restricted to daytime operations. In 1959, the station expanded to 24-hour broadcasting with the addition of a 500 watt nighttime signal.

After more than 46 years of continuous ownership, The Voice of Cullman applied in May 1996 to transfer the broadcast license for WFMH to Eddins Broadcasting Co., Inc., a company wholly owned by B.C. Eddins. The deal was approved by the Federal Communications Commission (FCC) on June 24, 1996, and the transaction was consummated on June 30, 1996. B.C. Eddins died on August 26, 1996, at the age of 81 and control of Eddins Broadcasting passed to his heirs.

In April 2002, Eddins Broadcasting Co., Inc., contracted to sell this station to Queen of Peace Radio, Inc. The deal was approved by the FCC on May 10, 2002, and the transaction was consummated on July 1, 2002. The new owners had the FCC assign this station the WMCJ call letters on September 20, 2002.

In March 2005, Queen of Peace Radio, Inc. (J. Christopher Williams, president) agreed to sell WMCJ to Williams Communications Inc. (Walton E. Williams Jr., president/director) for a reported sale price of $75,000. The deal was approved by the FCC on June 20, 2005, and the transaction was consummated on July 8, 2005. At the time of the sale, the station aired a Catholic radio format.

In May 2008, Williams Communications, Inc., applied to the FCC to transfer the license for this station to Walton E. Williams III. The deal was approved by the FCC on July 1, 2008, and the transaction was consummated on the same day.

This change would prove short-lived as in mid-August 2008, Walton E. Williams III reached an agreement to sell WMCJ and sister station WFMH to Jimmy Dale Media LLC. The two stations sold for a reported total of $375,000. At the time of the sale, the station aired a gospel music format. The deal was approved by the FCC on October 6, 2008. On December 1, 2012, WMCJ went silent. On April 1, 2013, WMCJ returned to the air simulcasting the sports programming of WFMH.

Jimmy Dale Media surrendered the licenses of WMCJ and WFMH in September 2024. The FCC cancelled the station's license on October 1, 2024.
