= Charles Kleibacker =

American fashion designer

- Born: Charles John Kleibacker; November 20, 1921; Cullman, Alabama, United States
- Died: January 3, 2010 (aged 88); Columbus, Ohio, United States
- Occupation: Fashion designer

Charles John Kleibacker (November 20, 1921 – January 3, 2010) was an American fashion designer who earned the nickname "Master of the Bias" for the complex designs of his gowns for women, carefully cut from fabric at a diagonal to the weave.

== Life ==
Kleibacker was born in Cullman, Alabama on November 20, 1921. His family were the proprietors of a department store in the municipality. He attended the University of Notre Dame, where he majored in journalism, and worked for a time as a reporter for a newspaper in Alabama. He attended New York University for his graduate studies.

While working at a clothing store in San Francisco, Kleibacker met singer Hildegarde and her manager Anna Sosenko at the hotel in which he was staying. He was hired as her driver, primarily because he owned a station wagon large enough to transport the singer's sizable entourage. On tour in Europe, Kleibacker met numerous fashion designers and came to the conclusion that he had an interest in the field while in the offices of Christian Dior. He submitted a series of his early designs while in Paris in 1954, and earned a post as an assistant at Lanvin. Back in New York City in 1957, Kleibacker worked for Nettie Rosenstein.

He started his own collection in 1959 in a brownstone on the Upper West Side of Manhattan and by the mid-1960s was designing clothing for some of the city's most exclusive clothiers, including Henri Bendel, Bergdorf Goodman and Bonwit Teller. Hildegarde was one of his few private customers, as well as such notables as Diahann Carroll, Alicia Markova and Pat Nixon. He would design clothing in silk and wool crepe, preferring the bias cut as it allowed for designs that appeared to "be cut, not stamped out". Vogue editor Diana Vreeland was an early supporter.

He joined the faculty of Ohio State University as Designer-in-Residence with the Historic Costume and Textiles Collection at the College of Human Ecology, where his work was part of a 2005 exhibit titled "Sculpture and Drapery: The Art of Fashion".

Kleibacker died at age 88 on January 3, 2010, in Columbus, Ohio due to pneumonia. At the time of his death, Kleibacker was an adjunct curator of design at the Columbus Museum of Art, where he had organized several exhibitions on fashion design.
