= A. B. Hollingsworth =

American football coach

Biographical details
- Born: January 11, 1899; Mount Andrew, Alabama, U.S.
- Died: January 5, 1961 (aged 61); Birmingham, Alabama, U.S.

Coaching career (HC unless noted)
- 1921–1922: Eufaula HS (AL)
- ?–1929: Bethel (KY)
- 1930: Union (TN) (assistant)
- 1931–1936: Union (TN)

Adolph Bradley Hollingsworth (January 11, 1899 – January 5, 1961) was an American college football coach. He served as the head football coach at Union University in Jackson, Tennessee from 1931 to 1936. He hired Bear Bryant as an assistant in 1936.

A native of Mount Andrew in Barbour County, Alabama, Hollingsworth graduated from the University of Alabama with a Bachelor of Science degree in 1921. He served as the head football at Eufaula High School in Eufaula, Alabama from 1921 to 1922. In 1926, Hollingworth began coaching at Bethel College in Russellville, Kentucky. He resigned from his post at Bethel in the summer of 1930 to become an assistant coach at Union University.

Hollingsworth married Mae Ella Munn of Ozark, Alabama on July 21, 1922. He later lived in Montgomery, Alabama and Birmingham, Alabama and worked as a district manager for the Orkin Exterminating Company. Hollingsworth died on January 5, 1961, in Birmingham.

== Head coaching record ==
=== College football ===
| Year | Team | Overall | Conference | Standing | Bowl/playoffs |
|---|---|---|---|---|---|
Union (Tennessee) Bulldogs (Southern Intercollegiate Athletic Association) (1931–1936)
| 1931 | Union (Tennessee) | 5–4 | 4–4 | T–4th | |
| 1932 | Union (Tennessee) | 0–8–1 | 0–6–1 | T–28th | |
| 1933 | Union (Tennessee) | 3–7 | 1–5 | T–26th | |
| 1934 | Union (Tennessee) | 6–4–1 | 2–3–1 | T–19th | |
| 1935 | Union (Tennessee) | 6–4–1 | 2–3–1 | T–20th | |
| 1936 | Union (Tennessee) | 6–4–1 | 5–1–1 | 7th | |
| Union (Tennessee): | | 26–31–4 | 14–22–4 | | |
| Total: | | | | | |
