= Folsom Field (Alabama) =

Cullman Regional Airport-Folsom Field
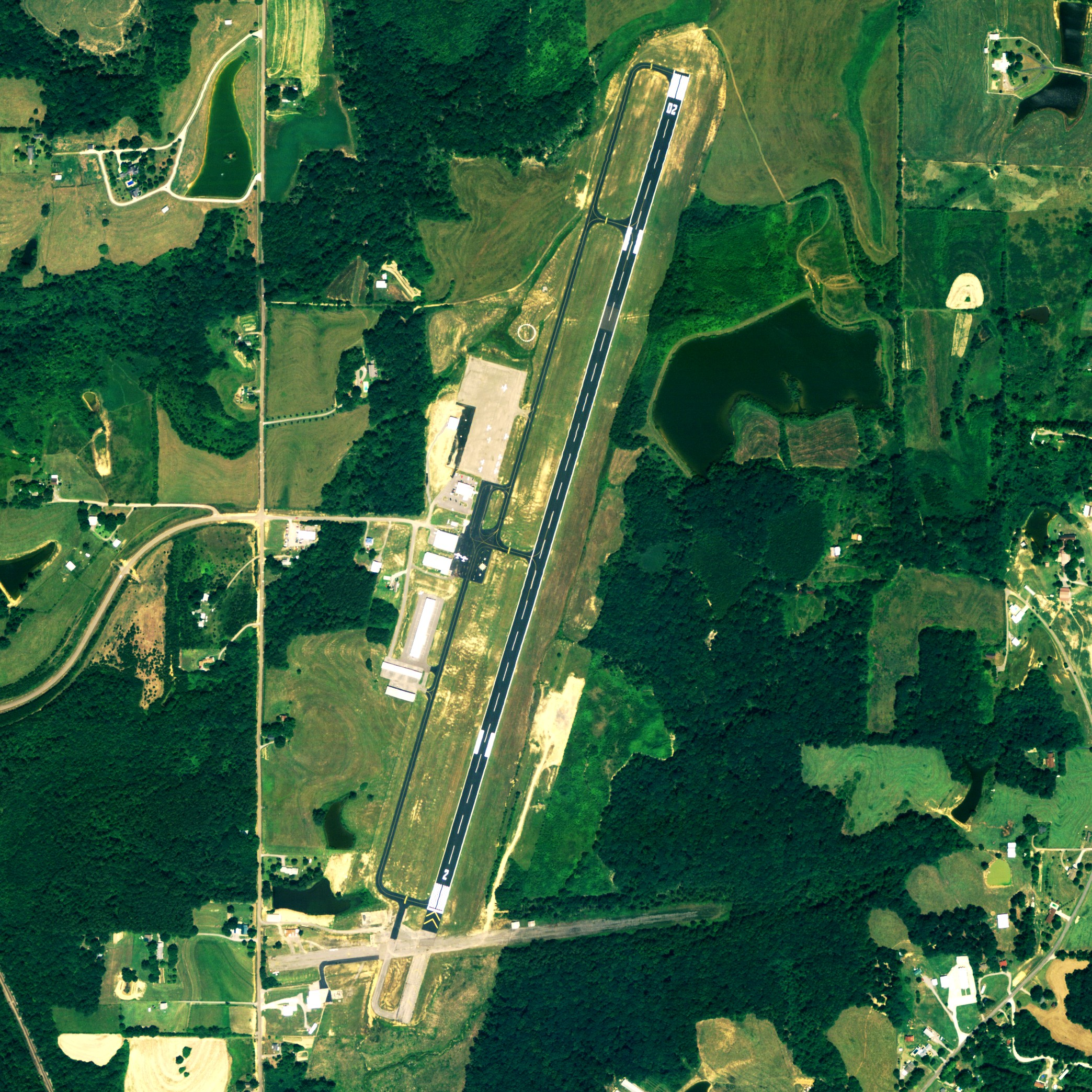
- NAIP aerial image, August 2006
- IATA: none; ICAO: KCMD; FAA LID: CMD

Summary
- Airport type: Public
- Owner: City/County of Cullman
- Serves: Cullman, Alabama
- Location: Vinemont, Alabama
- Elevation AMSL: 969 ft (295 m)
- Coordinates: 34°16′07″N 086°51′29″W
- Website: https://www.cullmanregionalairport.org/

Map
- Location of airport in Alabama KCMD (the United States)

Runways
Direction	Length		Surface
Direction	ft	m	Surface
2/20	5,500	1,676	Asphalt

Statistics (2017)
- Aircraft operations (2016): 37,830
- Based aircraft: 81
- Source: Federal Aviation Administration

Cullman Regional Airport-Folsom Field (ICAO: KCMD, FAA LID: CMD, formerly 3A1) is a public-use airport located five nautical miles (6 mi, 9 km) north of the central business district of Cullman, a city in Cullman County, Alabama, United States. It is owned by the City and County of Cullman.

This airport is included in the Federal Aviation Administration's National Plan of Integrated Airport Systems for 2011–2015 and 2009–2013, both of which are categorized as a general aviation airport.

== Facilities and aircraft ==
Folsom Field covers an area of 90 acres (36 ha) at an elevation of 969 feet (295 m) above mean sea level. It has one runway designated 2/20 with an asphalt surface measuring 5,500 by 100 feet (1,676 x 30 m).

For the 12-month period ending July 28, 2010, the airport had 37,830 aircraft operations, an average of 103 per day: 99.7% general aviation and 0.3% military. At that time there were 57 aircraft based at this airport: 86% single-engine, 5% multi-engine and 9% helicopter.

== Skydive Alabama ==
Skydive Alabama (SA), a civilian skydiving center, is operated out of Folsom Field. SA is a United States Parachute Association (USPA)-affiliated drop zone that operates year-round, maintaining a Beech 99. Most skydives take place from an altitude of around 14,000 feet, but high altitude jumps from 18,000 feet are commonly made with the use of supplemental oxygen.

== Accidents and incidents ==
- On 23 November 1982, popular Southern Baptist religious humorist, television personality and author Grady Nutt and two pilots with air charter operator Central American Inter'l Inc. were killed in the near-vertical crash of a Beechcraft Baron 95-B55, registration number N18411, shortly after takeoff under nighttime instrument meteorological conditions (IMC). The National Transportation Safety Board (NTSB) was unable to conclusively determine the cause of the crash, but bad weather and poor visibility were thought to be contributing factors.
- On 5 March 1984, the pilot and five passengers in a Cessna 421B, registration number N3291Q, were killed when the aircraft impacted trees 1 mile (1.6 km) northeast of the airport during an incorrectly executed nighttime instrument approach in IMC conditions. The NTSB attributed the accident to the pilot's failure to initiate a missed approach, his failure to maintain altitude, his lack of recent instrument flying experience, and his history of heart problems; contributing factors were poor visibility and adverse weather.
- On 14 January 1999, a Beechcraft 300, registration number N780BF, was destroyed in a crash approximately 3.5 miles (5.6 km) north of the airport after making a series of erratic turns during a missed approach in IMC conditions, killing the pilot and single passenger. The NTSB attributed the accident to the pilot's failure to correctly execute the missed approach procedure; a contributing factor was the lack of fixed-wing flight experience by the pilot, whose previous flying had almost exclusively been conducted in military rotorcraft.
- On 5 January 2020, an amateur-built Van's Aircraft RV-6, registration number N420PW, crashed on the field in a left spin during an apparent attempt to return to the airport after an engine failure on takeoff. Two people, the pilot and passenger on board, were killed. The accident is under investigation by the NTSB.
- On 20 February 2021, a Piper PA-32 crashed near the airport, killing one occupant and severely injuring the other. Four days later, the second aircraft occupant died from injuries sustained in the crash. NTSB investigators confirmed that one of the occupants reported the aircraft had lost power before the accident.

== See also ==
- List of airports in Alabama
