= Cullman, Alabama =

City in and county seat of Cullman County, Alabama

- City
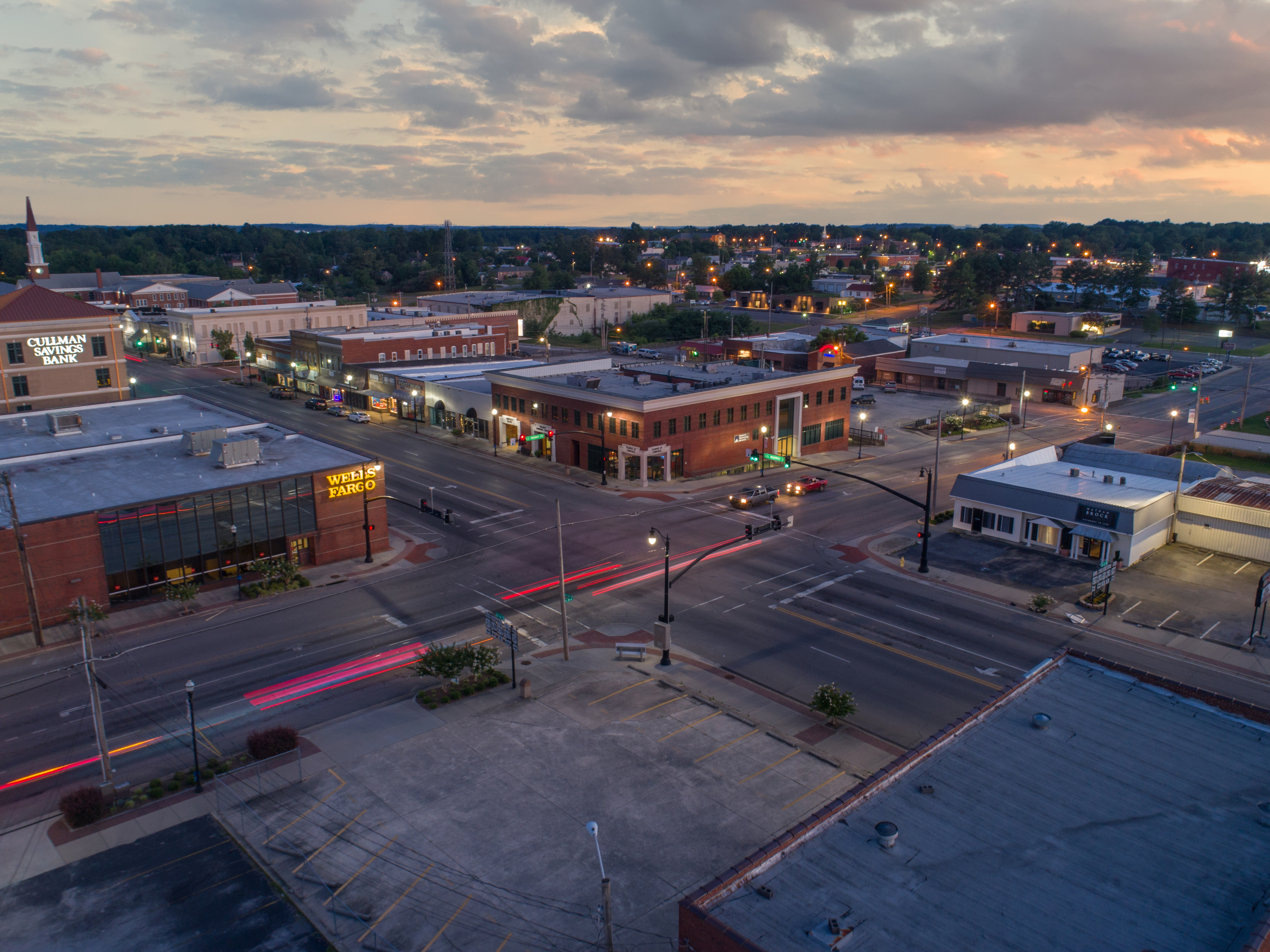
- Hwy 278 & Hwy 31 (2017)

- Flag Logo
- Motto: "A City of Character"
- Location of Cullman in Cullman County, Alabama
- Coordinates: 34°10′25″N 86°52′25″W
- Country: United States
- State: Alabama
- County: Cullman
- Founded: 1873
- Incorporated: March 6, 1875
- Named for: Colonel Johann Gottfried Cullmann

Area
  - City: 24.046 sq mi (62.279 km^{2})
  - Land: 22.704 sq mi (58.802 km^{2})
  - Water: 1.342 sq mi (3.477 km^{2})
- Elevation: 814 ft (248 m)

Population (2020)
  - City: 18,213
  - Estimate (2024): 20,239
  - Density: 851/sq mi (328.6/km^{2})
  - Urban: 21,165
  - Urban density: 985/sq mi (380.2/km^{2})
  - Metro: 90,665
  - Metro density: 123.4/sq mi (47.64/km^{2})
- Time zone: UTC−6 (Central (CST))
  - Summer (DST): UTC−5 (CDT)
- ZIP Code: 35055, 35056, 35057, 35058
- Area codes: 256 and 938
- FIPS code: 01-18976
- GNIS feature ID: 2404166
- Website: cullmanal.gov

Cullman is the largest city in and the county seat of Cullman County, Alabama, United States. As of the 2020 census it had a population of 18,213, with an estimated population of 20,239 in 2024. It is located along Interstate 65, about 50 miles (80 km) north of Birmingham and about 55 miles (89 km) south of Huntsville.

== History ==
Before the arrival of American settlers, the area that today includes Cullman was originally in the territory of the Cherokee Nation. The region was traversed by a trail known as the Black Warrior's Path, which led from the Tennessee River near the present location of Florence, Alabama, to a point on the Black Warrior River south of Cullman. This trail figured significantly in Cherokee history, and it featured prominently in the American Indian Wars prior to the establishment of the state of Alabama and the relocation of several American Indian tribes, including the Creek people westward along the Trail of Tears. During the Creek War in 1813, General Andrew Jackson of the U.S. Army dispatched a contingent of troops down the trail, one of which included the frontiersman Davy Crockett.

In the 1820s and the 1830s, two toll roads were built linking the Tennessee Valley to present-day Birmingham. In 1822, Abraham Stout was given a charter by the Alabama Legislature to open and turnpike a road beginning from Gandy's Cove in Morgan County to the ghost town of Baltimore on the Mulberry Fork near Colony. The road passed near present-day Vinemont through Cullman, Good Hope, and down the current Interstate 65 corridor to the Mulberry Fork. The road was later extended to Elyton (Birmingham) in 1827. It then became known as Stout's Road. Mace Thomas Payne Brindley was given a charter in 1833 to turnpike two roads, one running between Blount Springs to Somerville by way of his homestead in present-day Simcoe, and the second road passing west of Hanceville and east of Downtown Cullman to join Stout's Road north of the city. What later became the Brindley Turnpike became an extension of Stout's Road to Decatur. Cullman later became located between the juncture of the two roads, and they predated the corridor of U.S. Route 31.

During the Civil War, the future location of Cullman was the site of the minor Battle of Day's Gap. On April 30, 1863, Union forces under the command of Colonel Abel Streight won a victory over forces under Confederate General Nathan Bedford Forrest. This battle was part of a campaign and chase known collectively as Streight's Raid. Although Streight got the upper hand in this battle, Forrest would have the last laugh. In one of the more humorous moments of the war, Streight sought a truce and negotiations with Forrest in present-day Cherokee County near present-day Gaylesville. Although Streight's force was larger than Forrest's, while the two were negotiating, Forrest had his troops march repeatedly in a circuitous route past the site of the talks. Thinking himself to be badly outnumbered, Streight surrendered to Forrest.

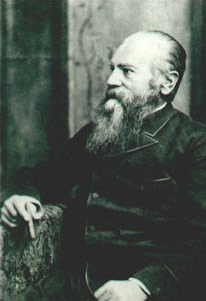
Colonel John G. Cullmann, founder of Cullman (1823–1895)

Cullman itself was founded in 1873 by Colonel John G. Cullmann, a German immigrant. Cullmann had been an advocate of democratic reforms in his native Bavaria, having fought and acquired his honorific title "Colonel" during the Revolutions of 1848–49. After the failure of the revolution, Cullmann found himself in financial ruin. In the years to follow, he would try to re-establish himself in business, but after several setbacks, including a great financial loss in the First Schleswig War, he would remain unsuccessful. As time went on and Prussia, under King Wilhelm I and his Minister President Otto von Bismarck, began to exert more influence in the German region (eventually unifying Germany under Prussian rule in 1871), Cullmann began to believe that his political ideals were fundamentally incompatible with those of the German Government. As a result, he decided to emigrate from his homeland. Settling first in London due to fears that he would be forced to join in the ongoing American Civil War, Cullmann eventually came to America in 1865. He moved to Alabama in 1871 and, in 1873, negotiated an agreement to act as agent for a tract of land 349,000 acres (1,410 km^{2}) in size, owned by the Louisville and Nashville Railroad Company, on which he established a colony for German immigrants.

Five German families moved to the area in March 1873; in 1874, the town was incorporated and named after Colonel Cullmann (with the town name being Americanized to 'Cullman' with one 'n'). Over the next 20 years, Cullmann encouraged around 100,000 Germans to immigrate to the United States, with many settling in the Cullman area. Cullmann drew on his military engineering training in laying out and planning the town. During this period, Cullman underwent considerable growth. German continued to be widely spoken, and Cullmann himself was the publisher of a German-language newspaper. When Cullmann died in 1895, at the age of 72, his funeral was marked by the attendance of Governor William C. Oates. The site Cullmann selected for his headquarters is now his gravesite.

German immigrants also founded St. Bernard's Monastery, on the grounds of which is the Ave Maria Grotto, containing 125 miniature reproductions of some of the most famous religious structures of the world. It is Cullman's principal tourist attraction.

From the 1890s until the 1950s, Cullman was a sundown town, where African Americans were not allowed to live. Tom Drake, a former Alabama state legislator and Speaker of the Alabama House of Representatives, stated that "there used to be signs on the railroad track, at the county line and all that. 'Nigger, don't let the sun set on your head in Cullman County.'" The need for Black day laborers in Cullman subsequently led to a rise in population of Colony, Alabama, a safe haven for the discriminated.

For many years Cullman was a college town, with Saint Bernard College serving as the home of several hundred students. In the mid-1970s, St. Bernard briefly merged with Sacred Heart College (a two-year Benedictine women's college), to become Southern Benedictine College. That college closed in 1979, and it now operates as St. Bernard Preparatory School, serving grades 9–12. The former site of Sacred Heart College is now the Sacred Heart Monastery, which serves as a retreat center operated by the Benedictine Sisters of Sacred Heart Monastery.

During the 20th century, Cullman developed a more diverse economy, including several manufacturing and distribution facilities. The City of Cullman regularly ranks as a top 'micropolitan' city in the nation.

Cullman gained national attention in early 2008, when a special election was held to fill a vacancy in the Alabama House of Representatives. The district that included Cullman elected James C. Fields, an African American, in that special election.

Cullman's German heritage was repressed during World War I and World War II, while the United States was fighting Germany. This was reversed in the 1970s, with renewed interest in the city's history and heritage. Today, Cullman holds an annual Oktoberfest. An honorary "Bürgermeister" is elected for each Oktoberfest. For many years the Oktoberfest did not include alcohol because Cullman was dry, but starting in 2011 the Oktoberfest was able to offer beer.

== Geography ==
Cullman is located on top of the Brindley Mountain plateau which is a close offshoot of the long geographic ridge called Sand Mountain, a southmost extension of the Appalachian Mountains. The elevation is 814 feet (248 m), close to the watershed between the Tennessee River and the Black Warrior River. Cullman provides its own town water supply from a city-owned lake within the city limits, Lake Catoma.

According to the United States Census Bureau, the city has a total area of 24.046 square miles (62.28 km^{2}), of which 22.704 square miles (58.80 km^{2}) is land and 1.342 square miles (3.48 km^{2}), is water.

New zoning laws and alcohol ordinances have allowed for greater expansion and growth in the downtown Cullman area.

=== Severe weather ===
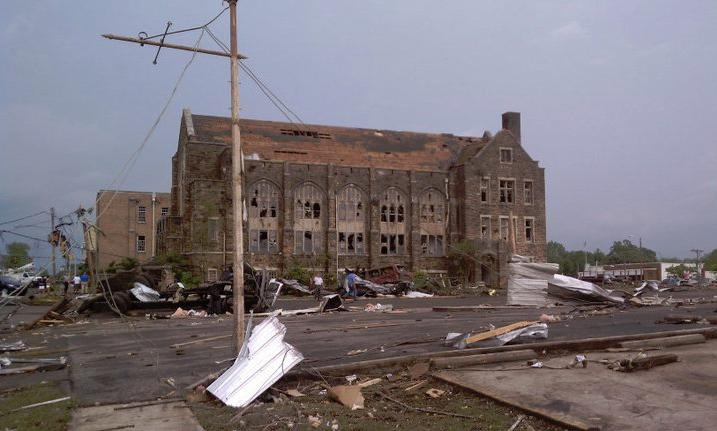
2011 tornado damage

Downtown was significantly damaged by an EF4 tornado during the 2011 Super Outbreak. Hitting on April 27, it destroyed many buildings in downtown and in an east-side residential area, but caused no fatalities. The twister moved northeast towards Arab and Guntersville, killing two Cullman County residents and at least four others. Cullman has since rebuilt and revitalized the downtown area.

=== Climate ===
The climate in this area is characterized by hot, humid summers and generally mild to cool winters. According to the Köppen Climate Classification system, Cullman has a humid subtropical climate, abbreviated "Cfa" on climate maps.

Climate data for Cullman, Alabama (Saint Bernard) (1991–2020 normals, extremes 1907–present)
Month	Jan	Feb	Mar	Apr	May	Jun	Jul	Aug	Sep	Oct	Nov	Dec	Year
Record high °F (°C)	80 (27)	85 (29)	89 (32)	92 (33)	96 (36)	104 (40)	110 (43)	108 (42)	107 (42)	98 (37)	89 (32)	80 (27)	110 (43)
Mean maximum °F (°C)	70.4 (21.3)	75.4 (24.1)	81.2 (27.3)	86.0 (30.0)	90.1 (32.3)	94.8 (34.9)	97.1 (36.2)	96.9 (36.1)	94.4 (34.7)	87.1 (30.6)	79.4 (26.3)	71.8 (22.1)	98.9 (37.2)
Mean daily maximum °F (°C)	52.3 (11.3)	57.2 (14.0)	65.2 (18.4)	73.7 (23.2)	80.5 (26.9)	86.7 (30.4)	89.7 (32.1)	89.6 (32.0)	84.7 (29.3)	74.6 (23.7)	63.3 (17.4)	55.1 (12.8)	72.7 (22.6)
Daily mean °F (°C)	41.9 (5.5)	46.1 (7.8)	53.4 (11.9)	61.5 (16.4)	69.1 (20.6)	76.0 (24.4)	79.4 (26.3)	79.4 (26.3)	73.4 (23.0)	62.1 (16.7)	51.1 (10.6)	44.4 (6.9)	61.5 (16.4)
Mean daily minimum °F (°C)	31.5 (−0.3)	34.9 (1.6)	41.6 (5.3)	49.4 (9.7)	57.8 (14.3)	65.3 (18.5)	69.2 (20.7)	69.2 (20.7)	62.1 (16.7)	49.7 (9.8)	38.9 (3.8)	33.7 (0.9)	50.3 (10.1)
Mean minimum °F (°C)	11.1 (−11.6)	15.6 (−9.1)	21.2 (−6.0)	30.2 (−1.0)	40.4 (4.7)	52.3 (11.3)	59.0 (15.0)	57.7 (14.3)	46.0 (7.8)	31.2 (−0.4)	20.9 (−6.2)	16.7 (−8.5)	8.9 (−12.8)
Record low °F (°C)	−17 (−27)	−7 (−22)	5 (−15)	21 (−6)	30 (−1)	40 (4)	48 (9)	48 (9)	34 (1)	19 (−7)	2 (−17)	−5 (−21)	−17 (−27)
Average precipitation inches (mm)	5.72 (145)	5.86 (149)	5.68 (144)	5.43 (138)	4.93 (125)	4.86 (123)	4.58 (116)	3.93 (100)	4.61 (117)	3.91 (99)	4.94 (125)	5.87 (149)	60.32 (1,530)
Average snowfall inches (cm)	0.3 (0.76)	0.3 (0.76)	0.3 (0.76)	0.0 (0.0)	0.0 (0.0)	0.0 (0.0)	0.0 (0.0)	0.0 (0.0)	0.0 (0.0)	0.0 (0.0)	0.0 (0.0)	0.1 (0.25)	1.1 (2.8)
Average precipitation days (≥ 0.01 in)	9.4	9.7	10.4	8.2	9.2	9.7	9.8	8.4	6.4	6.6	7.5	9.8	105.1
Average snowy days (≥ 0.1 in)	0.2	0.2	0.1	0.0	0.0	0.0	0.0	0.0	0.0	0.0	0.0	0.0	0.6
Source: NOAA

== Demographics ==
Historical population
Census	Pop.	Note	%±
1880	426		—
1890	1,017		138.7%
1900	1,255		23.4%
1910	2,130		69.7%
1920	2,467		15.8%
1930	2,786		12.9%
1940	5,074		82.1%
1950	7,523		48.3%
1960	10,883		44.7%
1970	12,601		15.8%
1980	13,084		3.8%
1990	13,367		2.2%
2000	13,995		4.7%
2010	14,775		5.6%
2020	18,213		23.3%
2025 (est.)	20,799	▲	14.2%
U.S. Decennial Census; 2020 Census

=== Racial and ethnic composition ===
Cullman city, Alabama – Racial and ethnic composition Note: the US Census treats Hispanic/Latino as an ethnic category. This table excludes Latinos from the racial categories and assigns them to a separate category. Hispanics/Latinos may be of any race. Race and ethnicity was not surveyed for populations under 2,500 in the 1980 census and under 1,000 in 1990 census.
Race / Ethnicity (NH = Non-Hispanic)	Pop 1980	Pop 1990	Pop 2000	Pop 2010	Pop 2020	% 1980	% 1990	% 2000	% 2010	% 2020
White alone (NH)	12,934	13,211	13,013	13,128	15,883	98.85%	98.83%	92.98%	88.85%	87.21%
Black or African American alone (NH)	27	27	45	113	236	0.21%	0.20%	0.32%	0.76%	1.30%
Native American or Alaska Native alone (NH)	13	18	33	46	29	0.10%	0.13%	0.24%	0.31%	0.16%
Asian alone (NH)	41	40	62	138	291	0.31%	0.30%	0.44%	0.93%	1.60%
Native Hawaiian or Pacific Islander alone (NH)	x	x	6	3	4	x	x	0.04%	0.02%	0.02%
Other race alone (NH)	0	0	7	10	33	0.00%	0.00%	0.05%	0.07%	0.18%
Mixed race or Multiracial (NH)	x	x	150	121	698	x	x	1.07%	0.82%	3.83%
Hispanic or Latino (any race)	69	71	679	1,216	1,039	0.53%	0.53%	4.85%	8.23%	5.70%
Total	13,084	13,367	13,995	14,775	18,213	100.00%	100.00%	100.00%	100.00%	100.00%

=== 2020 census ===
As of the 2020 census, Cullman had a population of 18,213. The median age was 39.1 years. 23.1% of residents were under the age of 18 and 20.2% of residents were 65 years of age or older. For every 100 females there were 89.4 males, and for every 100 females age 18 and over there were 86.0 males age 18 and over.

95.0% of residents lived in urban areas, while 5.0% lived in rural areas.

There were 7,445 households in Cullman, of which 4,614 were families. 31.1% had children under the age of 18 living in them. Of all households, 43.9% were married-couple households, 18.1% were households with a male householder and no spouse or partner present, and 33.1% were households with a female householder and no spouse or partner present. About 33.1% of all households were made up of individuals and 15.5% had someone living alone who was 65 years of age or older.

There were 8,023 housing units, of which 7.2% were vacant. The homeowner vacancy rate was 2.5% and the rental vacancy rate was 5.0%.

=== 2010 census ===
The population density was 765.0 inhabitants per square mile (295.4/km^{2}). There were 6,957 housing units at an average density of 365.1 per square mile (141.0/km^{2}). The racial makeup of the city was 95% White, 0.8% Black or African American, 0.5% Native American, 0.6% Asian, 0.0% Pacific Islander, and 1.6% from two or more races. 6.8% of the population were Hispanic or Latino of any race.

As of the 2010 census, there were 14,775 people and 6,957 households, out of which 22.5% had children under the age of 18 living with them, 48.3% were married couples living together, 10.7% had a female householder with no husband present, and 37.9% were non-families. 35.2% of all households were made up of individuals, and 18.0% had someone living alone who was 65 years of age or older. The average household size was 2.22 and the average family size was 2.85.

In the city, the population was spread out, with 21.8% under the age of 18, 8.2% from 18 to 24, 25.3% from 25 to 44, 22.6% from 45 to 64, and 22.1% who were 65 years of age or older. The median age was 41 years. For every 100 females, there were 87.5 males. For every 100 females age 18 and over, there were 81.4 males.

The median income for a household in the city was $29,164, and the median income for a family was $41,313. Males had a median income of $32,863 versus $21,647 for females. The per capita income for the city was $18,484. About 9.4% of families and 13.2% of the population were below the poverty line, including 12.3% of those under age 18 and 18.5% of those age 65 or over.

Cullman was ranked among Bloomberg Businessweek's 50 Best Places to Raise Your Kids in 2012 based on the city's educational and economic factors, crime level, air quality, amenities, and ethnic diversity.

== Education ==
Cullman is also the home of Wallace State Community College in Hanceville.

The Cullman City Schools, which includes almost all of the city, operates five schools:

- Cullman Primary School (pre-K – second grade)
- East Elementary (third – fifth grade)
- West Elementary (third – sixth grade)
- John G. Cullman Middle School (sixth and eighth grades)
- Cullman High School (ninth – twelfth grade)

Small portions of Cullman City are in the Cullman County Schools.

Other schools in Cullman include:

- St. Bernard Preparatory School, Benedictine boarding and day school (ninth – twelfth grade)
- Saint Bernard Middle School (seventh and eighth grade)
- Sacred Heart Elementary School (pre-K – sixth grade)
- Saint Paul's Lutheran School (Pre-K – sixth grade)
- Cullman Christian School (pre-K – twelfth grade)

== Media ==
=== Radio stations ===
- WFMH 1340 AM (Sports/Talk)
- WKUL 92.1 FM (Country/Talk)
- WRJM-LP 95.5 FM (CHR/AAA/Variety)
- WMCJ 1460 AM (Southern Gospel)
- WXJC-FM 101.1 FM (Gospel/Talk)

=== Newspapers ===
- The Tribune-Gazette (1898–1903)
- The Cullman Times (daily)
- The Cullman Tribune (daily)

=== Television ===
Cullman is in the TV broadcasting areas of Birmingham and Huntsville, Alabama.

There are two low-power broadcasting stations in Cullman: WCQT-LD TV-27 and CATV-2. Cullman also has a Public, Educational, and Government Access Television station, CCTV55, which is run by students at Cullman High School. CCTV55 was known as CATS-55 at one time.

== Health care ==
- Cullman Regional Medical Center – a 115-bed hospital

== Transportation ==
- Interstate 65
- U.S. Highway 31
- U.S. Highway 278
- State Route 69
- State Route 157
- CSX Transportation (railroad)
- Folsom Field municipal airport

== Notable people ==
- JoJo Billingsley, singer/songwriter
- Wesley Britt, former NFL player
- Paul Burnum, former basketball and baseball coach
- Paul Bussman, member of the Alabama Senate
- Caleb Clay, former MLB pitcher
- Melinda Dillon, actress
- Roger Hallmark, country musician
- Kurt Heinecke, composer and voice actor
- Brett Hestla, former touring bass player for Creed
- Charles Kleibacker, fashion designer
- Jordan Lee, bass fisherman
- Harold E. Martin, journalist and Pulitzer Prize winner
- William C. Martin, physicist
- Julian L. McPhillips, candidate for Attorney General of Alabama in 1978
- David Miller, NFL player
- Kassie Miller, singer/songwriter
- Talmadge Prince, stock car racing driver
- Josh Rutledge, former MLB player
- Shallow Side, rock music band formed in 2011
- Grant Sikes, internet personality
- Morgan Smith Goodwin, actress
- Frank Stitt, chef
- Channing Tatum, actor/model
- Keegan Thompson, MLB pitcher
- Wayne Trimble, American football player
- Zac Tubbs, American football player
- Holly Williams, country music singer
- Larry Willingham, NFL player

== See also ==
- List of sundown towns in the United States
