= Rohnie Sykes =

American football player (born 1984)

Rohnie Albert Sykes Jr (born March 15, 1984) is a retired American professional football tight end who played in the National Football League (NFL) for four seasons.

Sykes played college football at Morgan State University, and originally signed with the Kansas City Chiefs as an undrafted free agent in 2008. He also played for the Buffalo Bills' practice squad.

== Early life ==
Sykes attended Sheldon High School in Elk Grove, California, A three-sport athlete (Football, Basketball & Track) Sykes played Tight end and linebacker. A first-team all-state selection, Sykes was a first-team all-metro player; optimist and Shrine Bowl all-star. Sykes committed to Purdue University in 2002. He redshirted and returned to California to Yuba Community College. Sykes played in 5 football games there garnered over 500 yards receiving before signing to play at Morgan State.

== Kansas City Chiefs ==
=== 2008 season ===
Rohnie Sykes was invited to training camp as an undrafted Free Agent. On April 29, 2008, the Kansas City Chiefs signed Sykes to a three-year, $1.18 million contract with a signing bonus of $15,000 as an undrafted free agent. Through training camp, Sykes competed for a roster spot as a backup Tightend against Brad Cottam and J.P Foschi.

On August 29, 2008, Sykes was waived as a part of final roster cuts but was signed to the team's practice squad. On December 14, the team promoted Sykes to the active roster. On December 29, 2008, Sykes made his professional regular season debut.

== United Nation Gridiron League ==
Sykes was also part of the inaugural Season of the United Nation Gridiron League where he was drafted to the Alabama Roster.
