= Bear Bryant =

American football coach (1913–1983)

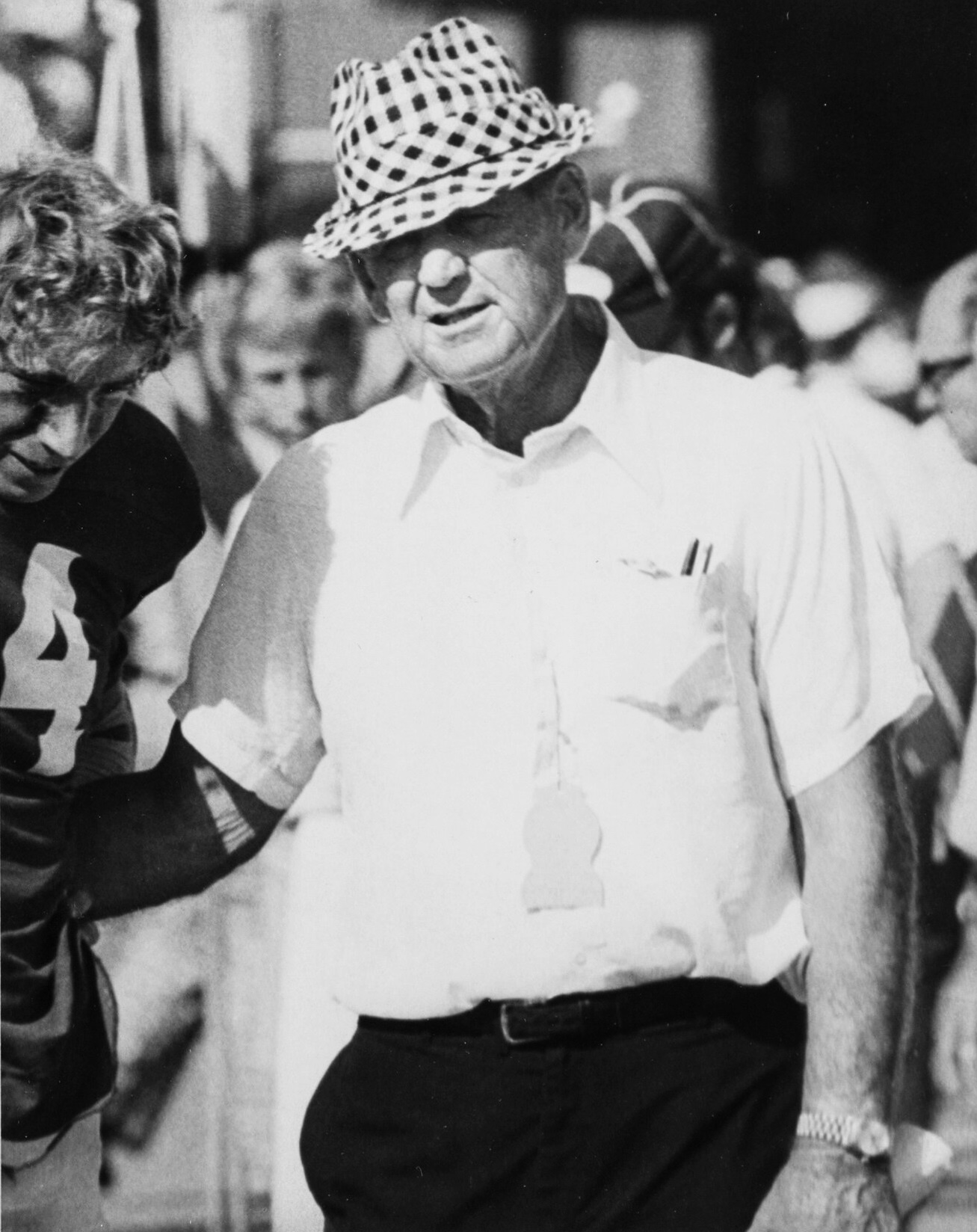
- Bryant in 1973

Biographical details
- Born: September 11, 1913; Moro Bottom, Arkansas, U.S.
- Died: January 26, 1983 (aged 69); Tuscaloosa, Alabama, U.S.

Playing career
- 1933–1935: Alabama
- Position: End

Coaching career (HC unless noted)
- 1936 (spring): Union (TN) (line)
- 1936–1939: Alabama (line)
- 1940–1941: Vanderbilt (line)
- 1942: Georgia Pre-Flight (ends)
- 1944: North Carolina Pre-Flight (line)
- 1945: Maryland
- 1946–1953: Kentucky
- 1954–1957: Texas A&M
- 1958–1982: Alabama

Administrative career (AD unless noted)
- 1954–1957: Texas A&M
- 1958–1983: Alabama

Head coaching record
- Overall: 323–85–17
- Bowls: 15–12–2

Accomplishments and honors

Championships
- As player: National champion (1934); As coach: 6x National (1961, 1964, 1965, 1973, 1978, 1979); 14× SEC champion (1950, 1961, 1964–1966, 1971–1975, 1977–1979, 1981); SWC champion (1956)

Awards
- As player: Third-team All-American (1935); Second-team All-SEC (1934); Third-team All-SEC (1933, 1935); As coach: 3× AFCA Coach of the Year (1961, 1971, 1973); 12× SEC Coach of the Year (1950, 1959, 1961, 1964, 1965, 1971, 1973, 1974, 1977–1979, 1981); SEC All-Time Team (1982)
- College Football Hall of Fame; Inducted in 1986 (profile)

Paul William "Bear" Bryant (September 11, 1913 – January 26, 1983) was an American college football player and coach. He is considered by many to be one of the greatest college football coaches of all time, and best known as the head coach of the University of Alabama football team, the Alabama Crimson Tide, from 1958 to 1982. During his 25-year tenure as Alabama's head coach, he amassed six national championships and 13 conference championships. Upon his retirement in 1982, he held the record for the most wins (323) as a head coach in collegiate football history. The Paul W. Bryant Museum, Paul W. Bryant Hall, Paul W. Bryant Drive, and Saban Field at Bryant–Denny Stadium are all named in his honor at the University of Alabama in Tuscaloosa.

He was also known for his trademark black and white houndstooth hat (even though he normally wore a plaid one), deep voice, casually leaning up against the goal post during pre-game warmups, and holding his rolled-up game plan while on the sidelines. Before arriving at Alabama, Bryant was head football coach at the University of Maryland, the University of Kentucky, and Texas A&M University.

== Early life ==
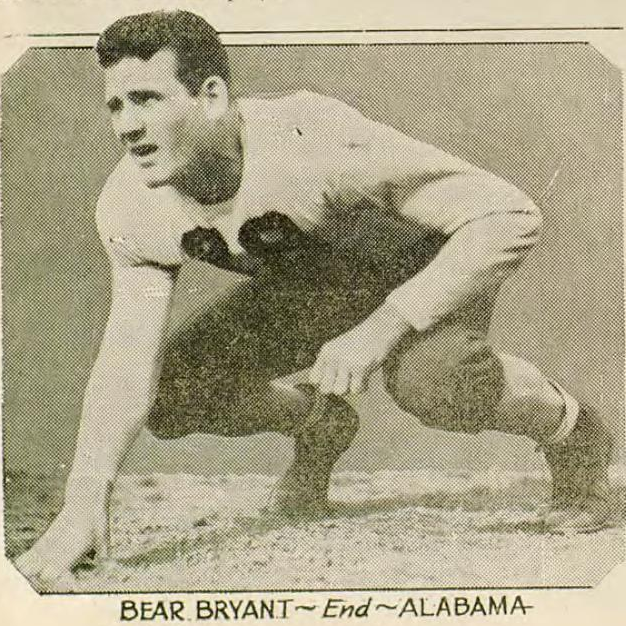
Bryant on the Alabama football team, c. 1934

Bryant was the 11th of 12 children who were born to Wilson Monroe Bryant and Ida Kilgore Bryant in Moro Bottom, Cleveland County, Arkansas. His nickname stemmed from his having agreed to wrestle a captive bear during a carnival promotion when he was 13 years old. His mother wanted him to be a minister, but Bryant told her "Coaching is a lot like preaching." He attended Fordyce High School, where the 6 ft 1 in (1.85 m) tall Bryant, who as an adult would eventually stand 6 ft 4 in (1.93 m), began playing on the school's football team as an eighth grader. During his senior season, Bryant played offensive line and defensive end, and the team won the 1930 Arkansas state football championship.

== College playing career ==
Bryant accepted a scholarship to play for the University of Alabama in 1931. Since he elected to leave high school before completing his diploma, Bryant had to enroll in a Tuscaloosa high school to finish his education during the fall semester while he practiced with the college team. Bryant played end for the Crimson Tide and was a participant on the school's 1934 national championship team. Bryant was the self-described "other end" during his playing years with the team, playing opposite the big star, Don Hutson, who later became a star in the National Football League and a Pro Football Hall of Famer. Bryant himself was second team All-Southeastern Conference in 1934, and was third-team all-conference in both 1933 and 1935. Bryant played with a partially broken leg in a 1935 game against Tennessee. Bryant was a member of Sigma Nu fraternity, and as a senior, he married Mary Harmon, which he kept a secret since Alabama did not allow active players to be married.

Bryant was selected in the fourth round by the Brooklyn Dodgers in the 1936 NFL draft, but he never played professional football.

== Coaching career ==
=== Assistant and North Carolina Pre-Flight ===
After graduating from the University of Alabama in 1936, Bryant was hired as the line coach under head coach A. B. Hollingsworth at Union University in Jackson, Tennessee, but he left that position when offered an assistant coaching position under Frank Thomas at the University of Alabama. Over the next four years, the team compiled a 29–5–3 record. In 1937, he was offered a position as the line coach for VMI under Pooley Hubert, but Bryant ultimately declined the offered and signed a two-year contract to stay with Alabama. In 1940, he left Alabama to become the line coach at Vanderbilt University under first-year Red Sanders. During their 1940 season, Bryant served as head coach of the Commodores for their 7–7 tie against Kentucky as Sanders was recovering from an appendectomy. After the 1941 season, Bryant was offered the head coaching job at the University of Arkansas. However, Pearl Harbor was bombed soon thereafter, and Bryant declined the position to join the United States Navy. In 1942, he served as the ends coach for the Georgia Pre-Flight Skycrackers.

Bryant then served off North Africa, on the United States Army Transport SS Uruguay, seeing no combat action. On February 12, 1943, in the North Atlantic the oil tanker USS Salmonie suffered a steering fault and accidentally rammed the SS Uruguay amidships. The tanker's bow made a 70-foot (21 m) hole in Uruguay's hull and penetrated her, killing 13 soldiers and injuring 50. The Uruguay's crew contained the damage by building a temporary bulkhead and three days later she reached Bermuda. President Franklin D. Roosevelt decorated Uruguay's Captain, Albert Spaulding, with the Merchant Marine Distinguished Service Medal for saving many lives, his ship and her cargo.

Bryant was later granted an honorable discharge to train recruits and coach the North Carolina Navy Pre-Flight football team. One of the players he coached for the Navy was the future Pro Football Hall of Fame quarterback Otto Graham. While in the navy, Bryant attained the rank of lieutenant commander.

=== Maryland ===
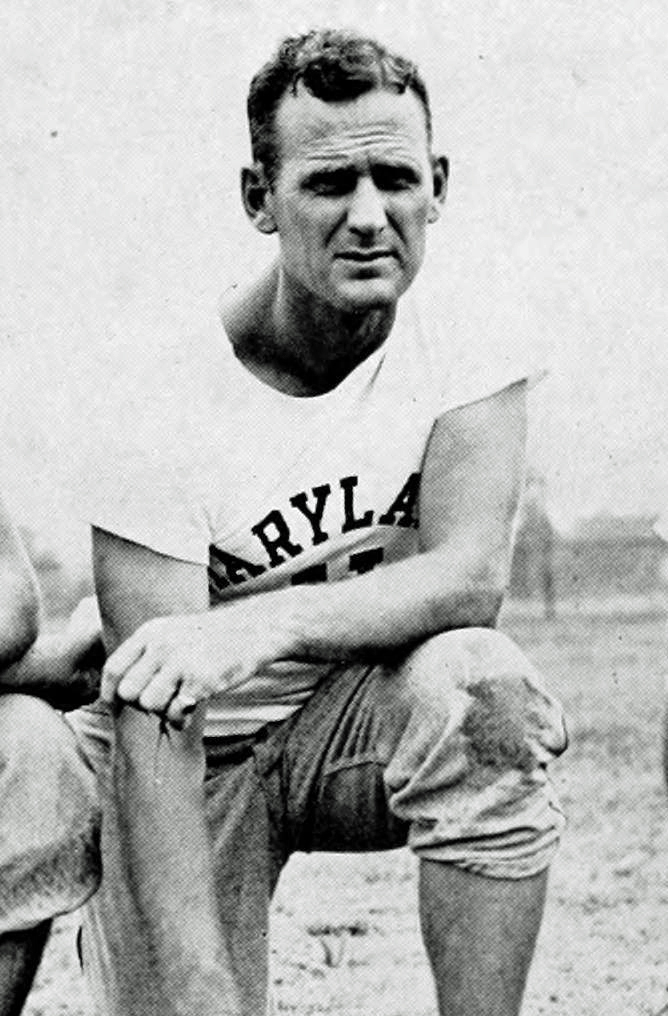
Bryant as Maryland head coach in 1945

In 1945, 32-year-old Bryant met Washington Redskins owner George Marshall at a cocktail party hosted by the Chicago Tribune, and mentioned that he had turned down offers to be an assistant coach at Alabama and Georgia Tech because he was intent on becoming a head coach. Marshall put him in contact with Harry Clifton "Curley" Byrd, the president and former football coach of the University of Maryland.

After meeting with Byrd the next day, Bryant received the job as head coach of the Maryland Terrapins. In his only season at Maryland, Bryant led the team to a 6–2–1 record. However, Bryant and Byrd came into conflict. In the most prominent incident, while Bryant was on vacation, Byrd brought back a player that was suspended by Bryant for not following the team rules. After the 1945 season, Bryant left Maryland to take over as head coach at the University of Kentucky.

=== Kentucky ===
Bryant coached at Kentucky for eight seasons. Under Bryant, Kentucky made its first bowl appearance in 1947 and won its first Southeastern Conference title in 1950. The 1950 Kentucky Wildcats football team finished with a school best 11–1 record and concluded the season with a victory over Bud Wilkinson's top-ranked Oklahoma Sooners in the Sugar Bowl. The final AP poll was released before bowl games in that era, so Kentucky ended the regular season ranked No. 7. But several other contemporaneous polls, as well as the Sagarin Ratings System applied retrospectively, declared Bryant's 1950 Wildcats to be the national champions, but neither the NCAA nor College Football Data Warehouse recognizes this claim. Bryant also led Kentucky to appearances in the Great Lakes Bowl, Orange Bowl, and Cotton Bowl Classic. Kentucky's final AP poll rankings under Bryant included #11 in 1949, #7 in 1950, #15 in 1951, #20 in 1952, and #16 in 1953. The 1950 season was Kentucky's highest rank until it finished No. 6 in the final 1977 AP Poll.

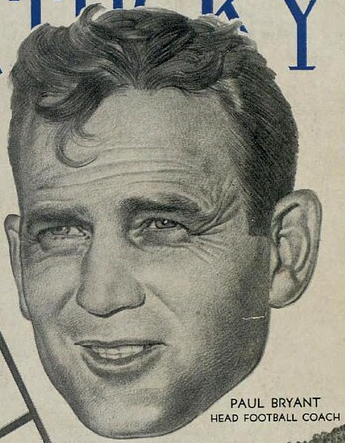
Bryant as Kentucky's head coach, c. 1950

Though he led Kentucky's football program to its greatest achievement, Bryant resigned after the 1953 season because he felt that Adolph Rupp's basketball team would always be the school's primary sport. The point shaving scandal that rocked the basketball program had Kentucky focus their energy on basketball, keeping Rupp on even after it had broken the rules in 1951, causing the Wildcats to be given the death penalty for the 1952–53 season. Bryant tried to resign that year for Arkansas but the school did not let him. Once it was confirmed that Rupp would not resign, Bryant was even more determined to leave. Years after leaving Lexington, when Bryant was Alabama's athletic director in 1969, he called Rupp to ask if he had any recommendations for Alabama's new basketball coach. Rupp recommended C. M. Newton, a former backup player at Kentucky in the late 1940s. Newton went on to lead the Crimson Tide to three straight SEC titles.

=== Texas A&M ===
In 1954, Bryant accepted the head coaching job at Texas A&M University. He also served as athletic director.

The Aggies suffered through a grueling 1–9 season in 1954, which began with the infamous training camp in Junction, Texas. The "survivors" were given the name "Junction Boys". In a 1980 interview with Time magazine, Bryant admitted that he had been too hard on the Junction Boys and "if I'd have been one of those players, I'd have quit too."

Two years later, Bryant led the 1956 Texas A&M Aggies football team to the Southwest Conference championship with a 34–21 victory over the Texas Longhorns at Austin. The following year, Bryant's star back John David Crow won the Heisman Trophy, and the 1957 Aggies were in title contention until they lost to the #20 Rice Owls in Houston, amid rumors that Alabama would be going after Bryant.

Again, as at Kentucky, Bryant attempted to integrate the Texas A&M squad. "We'll be the last football team in the Southwest Conference to integrate", he was told by a Texas A&M official. "Well", Bryant replied, "then that's where we're going to finish in football."

At the close of the 1957 season, having compiled an overall 25–14–2 record at Texas A&M, Bryant returned to Tuscaloosa to take the head coaching position, succeeding Jennings B. Whitworth, as well as the athletic director job at Alabama.

=== Alabama ===
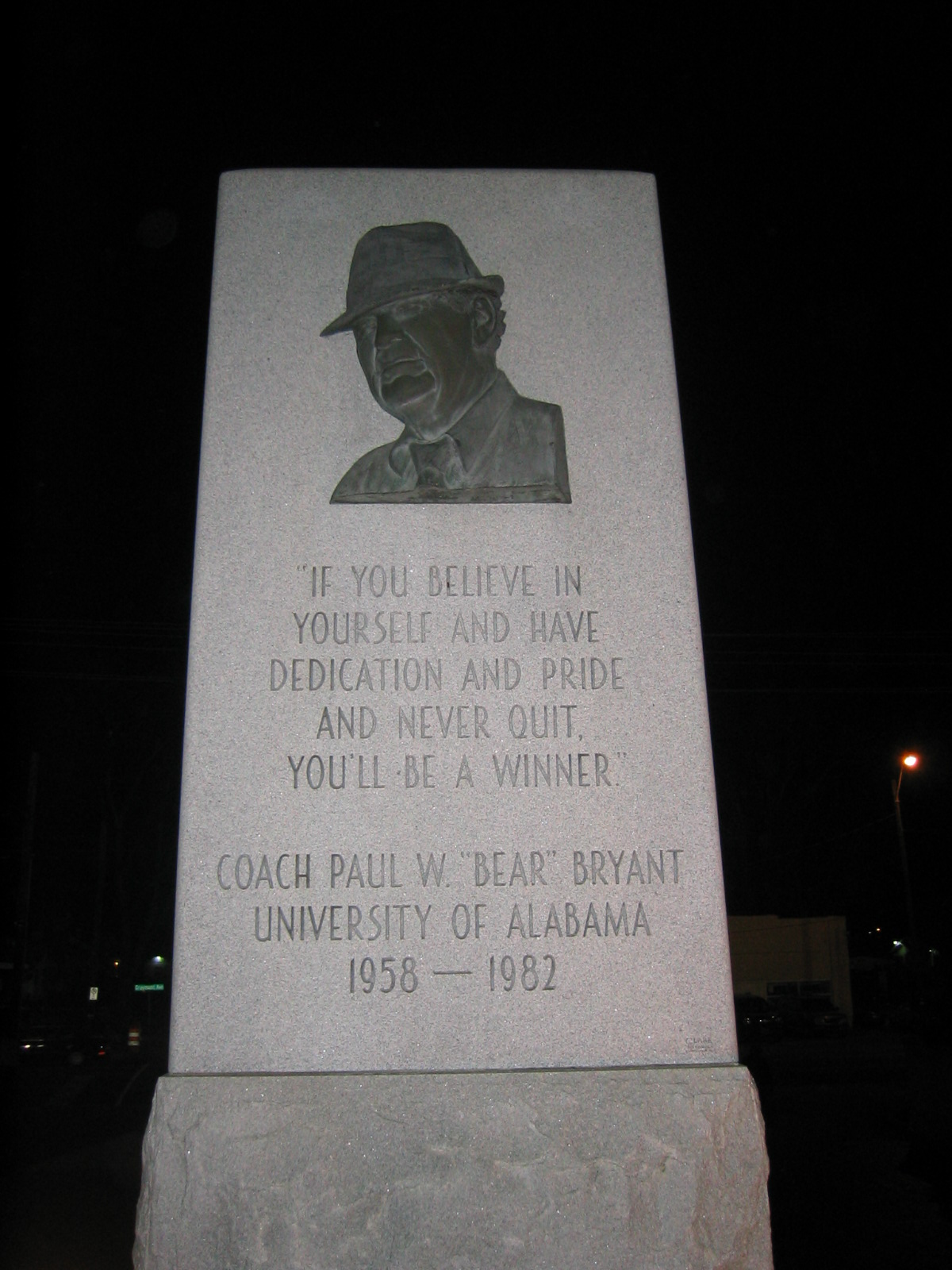
Memorial of Bryant outside Legion Field

When asked why he returned to his alma mater, Bryant replied, "Mama called. And when Mama calls, you just have to come runnin'." Bryant's first spring practice back at Alabama was much like what happened at Junction. Some of Bryant's assistants thought it was even more difficult, as dozens of players quit the team. After winning a combined four games in the three years before Bryant's arrival (including Alabama's only winless season on the field in modern times), the Tide went 5–4–1 in Bryant's first season. The next year, in 1959, Alabama beat Auburn and appeared in the inaugural Liberty Bowl, the first time the Crimson Tide had beaten Auburn or appeared in a bowl game in six years. In the 1960 season, Bryant led Alabama to an 8–1–2 record and a #9 ranking in the final AP Poll. In 1961, with quarterback Pat Trammell and football greats Lee Roy Jordan and Billy Neighbors, Alabama went 11–0 and defeated Arkansas 10–3 in the Sugar Bowl to claim the national championship.

The next three years (1962–1964) featured Joe Namath at quarterback and were among Bryant's finest. The 1962 Crimson Tide went 10–1, and the season ended with a 17–0 victory in the Orange Bowl over Bud Wilkinson's Oklahoma Sooners. The Crimson Tide finished No. 5 in the AP Poll. The 1963 Crimson Tide went 9–2, and the ended with a 12–7 victory over Ole Miss in the Sugar Bowl, which was the first game between the two Southeastern Conference neighbors in almost twenty years, and only the second in thirty years. Alabama finished No. 8 in the AP Poll In 1964 the Tide went 10–0 in the regular season and won another national championship, but lost 21–17 to Texas in the Orange Bowl. The Tide ended up sharing the 1964 national title with Arkansas, as the Razorbacks won the Cotton Bowl Classic, and had beaten Texas in Austin. Before 1968, the AP and UPI polls gave out their championships before the bowl games (with the exception of the 1965 season). The AP ceased this practice before the 1968 season, but the UPI continued until 1973.

The 1965 Crimson Tide went 9–1–1 and repeated as champions after defeating Nebraska, 39–28, in the Orange Bowl. Coming off back-to-back national championship seasons, Bryant's 1966 Alabama team went undefeated, beating a strong Nebraska team, 34–7, in the Sugar Bowl. However, Alabama finished third in the AP Poll behind Michigan State and champions Notre Dame, who had previously played to a 10–10 tie in a late regular season game. In a biography of Bryant written by Allen Barra, the author suggests that the major polling services refused to elect Alabama as national champion for a third straight year because of Alabama Governor George Wallace's recent stand against integration.

The 1967 Alabama team was billed as another national championship contender with star quarterback Kenny Stabler returning, but they stumbled out of the gate and tied Florida State, 37–37, at Legion Field. Alabama finished the year #8 at 8–2–1, losing 20–16 in the Cotton Bowl Classic to Texas A&M, coached by former Bryant player and assistant coach Gene Stallings. In 1968 Bryant again could not match his previous successes, as the team finished No. 17 went 8–3, losing to the Missouri, 35–10, in the Gator Bowl.

The 1969 and 1970 teams finished 6–5 and 6–5–1 respectively. After these disappointing efforts, many began to wonder if the 57-year-old Bryant was washed up. He himself began feeling the same way and considered either retiring from coaching or leaving college football for the National Football League (NFL).

For years, Bryant was accused of racism for refusing to recruit black players. (He had tried to do so at Kentucky in the late 40s but was denied by then University President, Herman Donovan.) Bryant said that the prevailing social climate and the overwhelming presence of noted segregationist George Wallace in Alabama, first as governor and then as a presidential candidate, did not let him do this. He finally was able to convince the administration to allow him to do so, leading to the recruitment of Wilbur Jackson as Alabama's first black scholarship player who was recruited in 1969 and signed in the Spring of 1970. Junior-college transfer John Mitchell became the first black player for Alabama in 1971 because freshmen, thus Jackson, were not eligible to play at that time. They would both be a credit to the university by their conduct and play, thus widening the door and warming the welcome for many more to follow. By 1973, one-third of the team's starters were black, and Mitchell became the Tide's first black coach that season.

In 1971 Bryant began engineering a comeback. This included abandoning the pro-style offense tailored to departed quarterback Scott Hunter's passing ability for the relatively new wishbone formation. Darrell Royal, the Texas football coach whose assistant, Emory Bellard virtually invented the wishbone, taught Bryant its basics, but Bryant developed successful variations of the wishbone that Royal had never used. The change helped make the remainder of the decade a successful one for the Crimson Tide.

The 1971 Alabama Crimson Tide football team went undefeated in the regular season and rose to No. 2 in the AP Poll, but were dominated by top-ranked Nebraska 38–6 in the Orange Bowl. In the 1972 season, Bryant led Alabama to a 10–0 start before falling to No. 9 Auburn in the Iron Bowl and #7 Texas in the Cotton Bowl.

Bryant's 1973 squad went undefeated in the regular season and split national championships with Notre Dame. Notre Dame later defeated Alabama, 24–23, in the Sugar Bowl. The UPI thereafter moved its final poll until after the bowl games. The Crimson Tide fared very similarly in the 1974 season. The team went undefeated in the regular season but fell to the #9 Notre Dame in the Orange Bowl 13–11. The 1975 season started off with a 20–7 setback to the Missouri Tigers. Alabama won every game after that, including the Sugar Bowl over Penn State, to finish 11–1 but finished No. 3 in the final AP Poll. Alabama went 9–3 in the 1976 season. The Crimson Tide finished the season with a 36–6 victory over #7 UCLA in the Liberty Bowl. Alabama finished No. 11 in the final AP Poll In the 1977 season, Alabama suffered a 31–24 loss to Nebraska in the second game of the season. Alabama won every game after that including a 35–6 victory over #9 Ohio State in the Sugar Bowl but Notre Dame ended up as National Champions and Alabama was ranked No. 2.

The 1978 Alabama Crimson Tide football team split the national title with USC despite losing to the Trojans in September. The Trojans lost later in the year to three-loss Arizona State and drop to number 3. At the end of the year, number 2 Alabama would beat undefeated and top-ranked Penn State in the Sugar Bowl, with the famous late-game goal line stand to preserve the victory.

Bryant won his sixth and final national title in 1979 after a 24–9 Sugar Bowl victory over Arkansas to cap a 12–0 season. Bryant led Alabama to a 10–2 record and a #6 ranking in the final AP Poll in the 1980 season. The season ended with a 30–2 victory over #6 Baylor in the Cotton Bowl. In 1981, Bryant led the Crimson Tide to a 9–2–1 record and a #7 ranking in the final AP Poll.

Bryant coached at Alabama for twenty-five years, winning six national titles (1961, 1964, 1965, 1973, 1978, and 1979) and thirteen SEC championships. Bryant's win over in-state rival Auburn, coached by former Bryant assistant Pat Dye on November 28, 1981, was Bryant's 315th as a head coach, which was the most of any head coach at that time. His all-time record as a coach was 323–85–17.

== Personal life and death ==
Bryant was a heavy smoker and drinker for most of his life, and his health began to decline in the late 1970s. He collapsed due to a cardiac episode in 1977 and decided to enter alcohol rehab, but resumed drinking after only a few months of sobriety. Bryant experienced a mild stroke in 1980 that weakened the left side of his body, another cardiac episode in 1981, and was taking a battery of medications in his final years.

Shortly before his death, Bryant met with evangelist Robert Schuller on a plane flight and the two talked extensively about religion, which apparently made an impression on the coach.

After a sixth-place SEC finish in the 1982 season that included losses to Auburn, LSU and Tennessee, each for the first time since 1970, Bryant, who had turned 69 that September, announced his retirement, stating, "This is my school, my alma mater. I love it and I love my players. But in my opinion, they deserved better coaching than they have been getting from me this year." His final regular season game was a loss to Auburn in Bo Jackson's freshman season. His last game was a 21–15 victory in the Liberty Bowl in Memphis, Tennessee, over the University of Illinois. After the game, Bryant was asked what he planned to do now that he was retired. He replied, "Probably croak in a week." He had spent all but one year of his adult life as a player, assistant coach or head coach.

Four weeks after making that comment, and just one day after passing a routine medical checkup, on January 25, 1983, Bryant checked into Druid City Hospital in Tuscaloosa after experiencing chest pain. A day later, when being prepared for an electrocardiogram, he died after suffering a massive heart attack.

His personal physician, Dr. William Hill, said that he was amazed that Bryant had been able to coach Alabama to two national championships in what would be the last five years of his life, given the poor state of his health. First news of Bryant's death came from Bert Bank (WTBC Radio Tuscaloosa) and on the NBC Radio Network (anchored by Stan Martyn and reported by Stewart Stogel). On his hand at the time of his death was the only piece of jewelry he ever wore, a gold ring inscribed "Junction Boys". He is interred at Birmingham's Elmwood Cemetery. A month after his death, Bryant was awarded the Presidential Medal of Freedom, the nation's highest civilian award, by President Ronald Reagan. A moment of silence was held before Super Bowl XVII, played four days after Bryant's death.

== Defamation suit ==
In 1962 Bryant filed a libel suit against The Saturday Evening Post for printing an article by Furman Bisher ("College Football Is Going Berserk") that charged him with encouraging his players to engage in brutality in a 1961 game against the Georgia Tech Yellow Jackets. Six months later, the magazine published "The Story of a College Football Fix" that charged Bryant and Georgia Bulldogs athletic director and ex-coach Wally Butts with conspiring to fix their 1962 game together in Alabama's favor. Butts also sued Curtis Publishing Co. for libel. The case was decided in Butts' favor in the US District Court of Northern Georgia in August 1963, but Curtis Publishing appealed to the Supreme Court. As a result of Curtis Publishing Co. v. Butts 388 U.S. 130 (1967), Curtis Publishing was ordered to pay $3,060,000 in damages to Butts. The case is considered a landmark case because it established conditions under which a news organization can be held liable for defamation of a "public figure". Bryant reached a separate out-of-court settlement on both of his cases for $300,000 against Curtis Publishing in January 1964.

== Honors and awards ==
- Inducted into Omicron Delta Kappa at the University of Kentucky in 1949
- Twelve-time Southeastern Conference Coach of the Year
- On October 8, 1988, the Paul W. Bryant Museum opened to the public. The museum chronicles the history of sports at The University of Alabama.
- The portion of 10th Street which runs through the University of Alabama campus was renamed Paul W. Bryant Drive.
- Three-time National Coach of the Year in 1961, 1971, and 1973. The national coach of the year award was subsequently named the Paul "Bear" Bryant Award in his honor.
- In 1975 Alabama's Denny Stadium was renamed Bryant–Denny Stadium in his honor. Bryant would coach the final seven years of his tenure at the stadium, and is thus one of only four men in Division I-A/FBS to have coached in a stadium named after him. The others are Shug Jordan at Auburn, Bill Snyder at Kansas State and LaVell Edwards at BYU.
- Was named Head Coach of Sports Illustrated's NCAA Football All-Century Team.
- He received 1.5 votes for the Democratic Party Presidential nomination at the extremely contentious 1968 Democratic Convention
- In 1979 Bryant received the Golden Plate Award of the American Academy of Achievement. His Golden Plate was presented by Awards Council member Tom Landry.
- In February 1983 Bryant was posthumously awarded the Presidential Medal of Freedom by President Ronald Reagan.
- Bryant was honored with a U.S. postage stamp in 1996.
- Country singer Roger Hallmark recorded a tribute song in his honor.
- Charles Ghigna wrote a poem that appeared in the Birmingham-Post Herald in 1983 as a tribute to Bryant.
- Super Bowl XVII was dedicated to Bryant. A moment of silence was held in his memory during the pregame ceremonies. Some of his former Alabama players were on the rosters of both teams, including Miami Dolphins nose tackle Bob Baumhower and running back Tony Nathan, and Washington Redskins running back Wilbur Jackson (in December 1970, Jackson became the first black football player to sign a letter of intent at Alabama) Also, at the end of Leslie Easterbrook's performance of the National Anthem, several planes from Maxwell Air Force Base in Alabama did the traditional missing-man formation over the Rose Bowl in his memory, a nod to Bryant's service in the Navy.
- The extinct shark Cretalamna bryanti was named after Bryant and his family in 2018, due to their contributions to the University of Alabama and McWane Science Center where the type material is held.

== Legacy ==
Many of Bryant's former players and assistant coaches went on to become head coaches at the collegiate level and in the National Football League. Danny Ford (Clemson, 1981), Howard Schnellenberger (Miami of Florida, 1983), and Gene Stallings (Alabama, 1992), one of the Junction Boys, all won national championships as head coaches for NCAA programs while Joey Jones, Mike Riley, and David Cutcliffe are active head coaches in the NCAA. Charles McClendon, Jerry Claiborne, Sylvester Croom, Jim Owens, Jackie Sherrill, Bill Battle, Bud Moore and Pat Dye were also notable NCAA head coaches. Croom was the SEC's first African-American head coach at Mississippi State from 2004 through 2008.

Super Bowl LV winning NFL head coach Bruce Arians was a running backs coach under Bryant in 1981–82. Arians also served as a successful head coach of the Arizona Cardinals, leading them to just their second ever appearance in the NFC Championship Game in 2015.

Ozzie Newsome, who played for Bryant at Alabama from 1974 to 1977, played professional football for the Cleveland Browns for thirteen seasons (1978–1990), and was inducted into the Pro Football Hall of Fame in 1999. Newsome was the general manager of the Cleveland Browns-Baltimore Ravens from 1996 through 2018. Newsome was the GM of the Ravens' Super Bowl XXXV championship team in 2000, and their Super Bowl XLVII championship team in 2012.

Jack Pardee, one of the Junction Boys, played linebacker in the NFL for sixteen seasons with the Los Angeles Rams and Washington Redskins, was a college head coach at the University of Houston, and an NFL head coach with Chicago, Washington, and Houston.

Bryant was portrayed by Gary Busey in the 1984 film The Bear, by Sonny Shroyer in the 1994 film Forrest Gump, Tom Berenger in the 2002 film The Junction Boys, and Jon Voight in the 2015 film Woodlawn. Bryant is also mentioned as one of the titular 'Three Great Alabama Icons' in the song of the same name by the Drive-By Truckers on their album Southern Rock Opera.

== Head coaching record ==
In his 38 seasons as a head coach, Bryant had 37 winning seasons and participated in a total of 29 postseason bowl games, including 24 consecutively at Alabama. He won fifteen bowl games, including eight Sugar Bowls. Bryant still holds the records as the youngest college football head coach to win three hundred games and compile thirty winning seasons.

Year	Team	Overall	Conference	Standing	Bowl/playoffs	Coaches^{#}	AP^{°}
Maryland Terrapins (Southern Conference) (1945)
1945	Maryland	6–2–1	3–2	5th			
Maryland:		6–2–1	3–2				
Kentucky Wildcats (Southeastern Conference) (1946–1953)
1946	Kentucky	7–3	2–3	8th			
1947	Kentucky	8–3	2–3	T–9th	W Great Lakes		
1948	Kentucky	5–3–2	1–3–1	9th			
1949	Kentucky	9–3	4–1	2nd	L Orange		11
1950	Kentucky	11–1	5–1	1st	W Sugar	7	7
1951	Kentucky	8–4	3–3	5th	W Cotton	17	15
1952	Kentucky	5–4–2	1–3–2	9th		19	20
1953	Kentucky	7–2–1	4–1–1	3rd		15	16
Kentucky:		60–23–5	22–18–4				
Texas A&M Aggies (Southwest Conference) (1954–1957)
1954	Texas A&M	1–9	0–6	7th			
1955	Texas A&M	7–2–1	4–1–1	2nd		14	17
1956	Texas A&M	9–0–1	6–0	1st		5	5
1957	Texas A&M	8–3	4–2	3rd	L Gator	10	9
Texas A&M:		25–14–2	14–9–1				
Alabama Crimson Tide (Southeastern Conference) (1958–1982)
1958	Alabama	5–4–1	3–4–1	T–6th			
1959	Alabama	7–2–2	4–1–2	4th	L Liberty	13	10
1960	Alabama	8–1–2	5–1–1	3rd	T Bluebonnet	10	9
1961	Alabama	11–0	7–0	T–1st	W Sugar	1	1
1962	Alabama	10–1	6–1	2nd	W Orange	5	5
1963	Alabama	9–2	6–2	2nd	W Sugar	9	8
1964	Alabama	10–1	8–0	1st	L Orange	1	1
1965	Alabama	9–1–1	6–1–1	1st	W Orange	4	1
1966	Alabama	11–0	6–0	T–1st	W Sugar	3	3
1967	Alabama	8–2–1	5–1	2nd	L Cotton	7	8
1968	Alabama	8–3	4–2	T–3rd	L Gator	12	17
1969	Alabama	6–5	2–4	8th	L Liberty		
1970	Alabama	6–5–1	3–4	T–7th	T Astro-Bluebonnet		
1971	Alabama	11–1	7–0	1st	L Orange	2	4
1972	Alabama	10–2	7–1	1st	L Cotton	4	7
1973	Alabama	11–1	8–0	1st	L Sugar	1	4
1974	Alabama	11–1	6–0	1st	L Orange	2	5
1975	Alabama	11–1	6–0	1st	W Sugar	3	3
1976	Alabama	9–3	5–2	3rd	W Liberty	9	11
1977	Alabama	11–1	7–0	1st	W Sugar	2	2
1978	Alabama	11–1	6–0	1st	W Sugar	2	1
1979	Alabama	12–0	6–0	1st	W Sugar	1	1
1980	Alabama	10–2	5–1	T–2nd	W Cotton	6	6
1981	Alabama	9–2–1	6–0	T–1st	L Cotton	6	7
1982	Alabama	8–4	3–3	T–5th	W Liberty	17	
Alabama:		232–46–9	137–28–5				
Total:		323–85–17					
National championship Conference title Conference division title or championship game berth
^{#}Rankings from final Coaches Poll.; ^{°}Rankings from final AP Poll.

== See also ==
- List of college football career coaching wins leaders
- List of presidents of the American Football Coaches Association
- The Bear Bryant Show
