= Brad Roach =

American gridiron football player (born 1985)

No. 8
- Position: Quarterback

Personal information
- Born: March 4, 1985 (age 41); Williamston, North Carolina, U.S.
- Listed height: 6 ft 6 in (1.98 m)
- Listed weight: 245 lb (111 kg)

Career information
- College: Catawba
- NFL draft: 2008: undrafted

Career history
- Baltimore Ravens (2008)*; Mahoning Valley Thunder (2009); Montreal Alouettes (2009)*
- * Offseason or practice squad member only

Awards and highlights
- First-team All-SAC (2007); SAC Offensive Player of the Year (2007); AFCA All-American (2007)
- Stats at CFL.ca (archive)

Brad Roach (born March 4, 1985) is an American former football quarterback. He was signed by the Baltimore Ravens as an undrafted free agent in 2008. He played college football at Catawba.

Roach has also been a member of the Montreal Alouettes.
