= Cullman High School =

Public high school in Alabama, United States

Location
- 510 13th Street NE; Cullman, Alabama 35055; United States; 34°11′18″N 86°50′31″W

Information
- Type: Public high school
- Motto: Learning Today, Leading Tomorrow
- Established: 1908 (118 years ago)
- School district: Cullman City Schools
- CEEB code: 010795
- Principal: Allison Tuggle
- Teaching staff: 61.90 (on an FTE basis)
- Grades: 9-12
- Enrollment: 1,014 (2024-2025)
- Student to teacher ratio: 16.38
- Colors: Black, gold, and white
- Athletics: Football, marching band, basketball, baseball, softball, soccer, tennis, golf, cross country, track, indoor track, cheerleading, indoor drumline, volleyball, bowling
- Athletics conference: AHSAA Class 6A
- Nickname: Bearcats
- Rivals: Hartselle Tigers and Jasper Vikings
- Newspaper: The Hilight
- Yearbook: The Southerner
- Affiliation: Southern Association of Colleges and Schools
- Website: cullmanhigh.cullmancats.net

Cullman High School is the only public high school in the city of Cullman, Alabama as well as the largest high school in Cullman County, Alabama. The school is classified as a 6A school and belongs to the Cullman City School District.

As of the 2010-2011 school year, the school had an enrollment of more than 930 students and 63 teachers, in grades 9-12, with an FTE ratio of 15.6.

Cullman High School is also known for the high level of achievement of its students. Over the years, Cullman High School has been home to numerous National Merit Scholars, Presidential Scholars, and Horatio Alger National Scholars.

== History ==
Cullman High School was founded under the name "Cullman County High School" in 1908. That year, a group of 45 students attended the first classes on the second floor of the Imbusch Building in downtown Cullman, which housed the W. O. Kelley General Store. The building is located in downtown Cullman on the corner of Third Avenue and Third Street and still stands to this day. The following year, in 1909, two Cullman businessmen, George H. Parker, and C. H. Stiefelmeyer donated 5 acres (20,000 m^{2}) of land and donated $10,000 to construct a new school, which was located at 800 Second Avenue, which is the current site of Cullman Middle School.

By 1920, nearly 280 students were enrolled at Cullman County High School and an expansion was needed. A new classroom building and an auditorium were added to the Second Avenue campus to curb the growth in enrollment. The school was nearly closed in 1935 when funding was completely lost due to the Great Depression. Students were warned that the school would close and they would not be able to graduate. Fortunately, the businessmen of the City of Cullman rallied together to raise the funds needed to keep the school open.

By 1940, the school was known statewide as a leader in sports, especially football and baseball. The academic programs were also renowned as being "ahead of their time." In 1949, the various schools within Cullman were taken over by the city and the Cullman City School System was officially formed. It was at this time that the word "county" was dropped from the name to indicate the school only served students living within the city limits of Cullman.

In 1960, a new Cullman High School campus was built at the current site at 510 Thirteenth Street. The old high school campus was demolished and Cullman Middle School was constructed there.

The present-day campus of Cullman High School has been in the works for the past 2 years at the Thirteenth Street site. The new Cullman High School expanded campus when completed, will support nearly 2,000 students and include updated facilities. The additions began in 2008.

Phase I of the Cullman High School Expansion Project was completed in the fall of 2010, bringing with it a new $4-million auxiliary gymnasium, a 5,000 square feet (460 m^{2}) science building addition and a new football stadium with an artificial turf field and an 8-lane track.

Phase II will begin in late 2010 or early 2011, and includes a new two-story library and media center; conversion of the current library into a state-of-the-art business/career technical center; a second-story addition to all of the academic buildings and administration; a new school entrance and lobby; an expanded cafeteria; an outdoor amphitheater outside the cafeteria; complete refurbishing of all academic buildings, the main gym, and the auditorium; expanded student and faculty parking; and potential other expansions and additions.

Student Enrollment History
1910s - 1920s	45 - 280
1930s	~300
1940s	~560
1950s	~750
1960s	~800
1970s	~920
1980s	~780
1990s	~800
2000s	~900
2010s	~900

== Sports ==
The baseball program won its first state championship in 2002 and has been to the championship series of the playoffs every year from 2003 to 2008, except 2005. The baseball program won the state championship yet again in 2007 and also set a new state record for wins in a season with a 48-7 record. The baseball program has recently won its third state championship and second championship in a row in 2008. The soccer program also won a state championship in 2002. Cullman's cheerleader's won the 5A state championship for 2005–2006, 2006–2007 and 2007-2008. The football program broke the school record for most wins in a single season in 2007 with a record of 13 wins and only 1 loss. It was the first time in school history for a Cullman football team to make it to the fourth round of the state playoffs. In October 2009, they clinched their 3rd consecutive region title. The 2012-2013 bearcats went 10-3, and went to the 3rd round of the playoffs.

The math teams also won a state championship in all divisions (Geometry, Algebra II, and Analysis) in 2007, a record that was continued in 2008 by the Geometry and Algebra II teams.

== Band ==
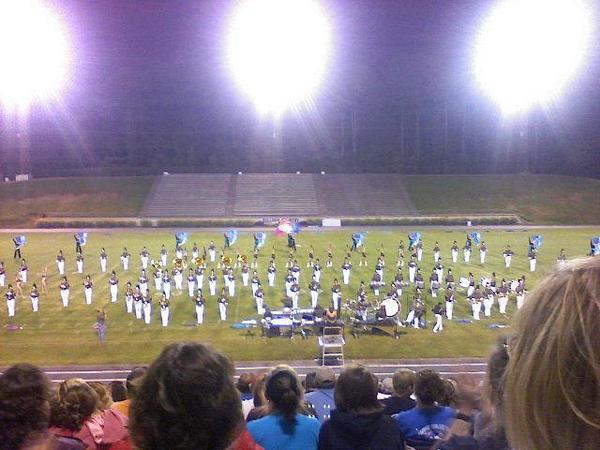
Cullman High School Bearcat Marching Band 2007

The band program was formed in 1929 and has expanded over the years to include more than 300 total students. Cullman High School is also known for its large percentage of student enrollment participating in the band program, with more than 20% of all Cullman High School students active in the band program. The band has been successful on the national level, and attended the National Adjudicators Invitational in Cincinnati in 2005.

The Cullman High School Bearcat Band performs at every school football game throughout the year, as well as marching in the annual fair parade, performing at the Cullman County Band Exhibition, and participating in three contests per year. The band normally competes in the large band classifications, and has received all superior ratings in every competition it has competed in, including taking home "Best in Class" for AAA bands at the 2004 and 2005 Hoover Invitationals. The auxiliaries (color guard, dance line, and majorettes) are known throughout the state and have won many best in class awards. Starting in the fall of 2011, the Cullman High School Band will start competing at Bands of America (BOA). This a national level of band competitions.

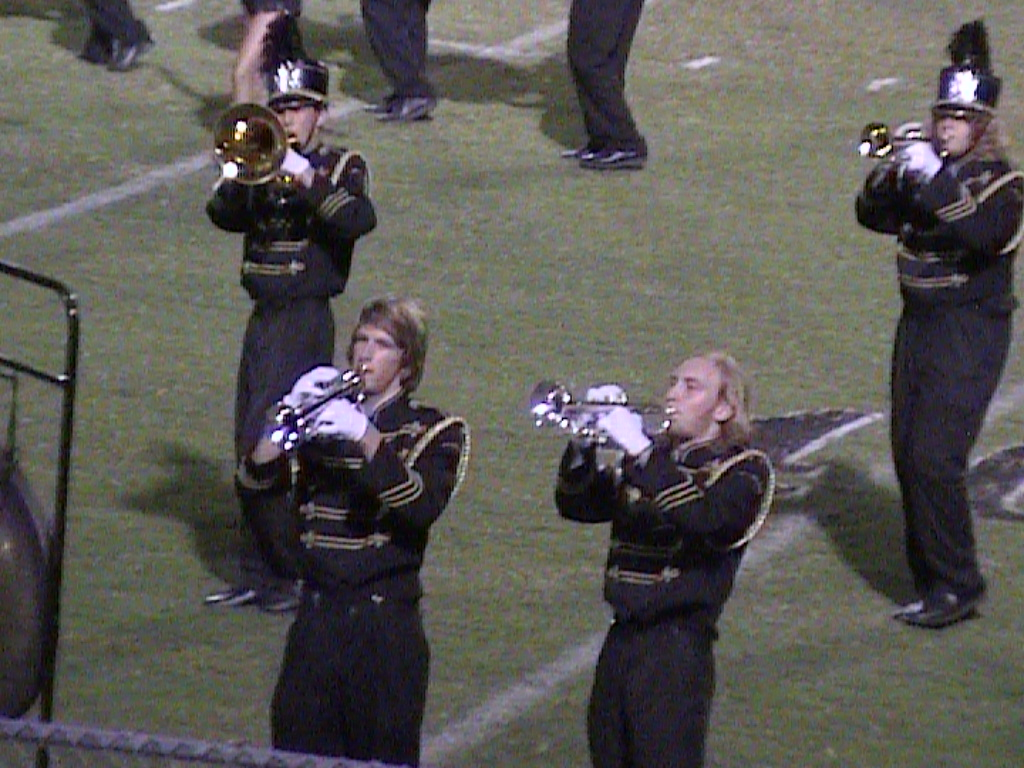
A trumpet duet performed by members of the Cullman High School marching band.

In 2007 the CHS Band marched in the Veteran's Day parade in New York and appeared on CBS Early Show. In 2008 the band marched in the McDonald's Thanksgiving Day parade in Chicago, and in 2009 the band performed under the St. Louis Gateway Arch in St. Louis, Missouri. In 2010, the band performed in a parade at Universal Studios in Orlando, Florida. Also, in 2011, the band performed in the Dunkin Donuts Philadelphia Thanksgiving Day Parade.

Cullman High School also has a German Band, performing throughout Oktoberfest; a symphonic band, which is made up of mostly 11th and 12th graders; a regular concert band, which is mostly underclassmen; a jazz band, performing at both Christmas and spring concerts, as well as the annual Big Band Dance; and a pep band, which is considered to be the largest pep band in the state.

The Cullman High School Band also sponsors the Cullman Indoor Drumline, which was formed in late 2008. The Cullman Indoor Drumline competes in both the Southeastern Color Guard Circuit (SCGC), where the drumline has always finished in the top 6, and in Winter Guard International (WGI) on the national level.

== Advanced Placement (AP) Courses ==
In 2007, 40 CHS students took the AP exams for these courses. Of those who took the exams, 20% scored a 5, 25% scored a 4, 32.5% scored a 3, 14% scored a 2, and 8.5% scored a 1. Beginning with the 2010-2011 school year, all students who take AP courses are required to take the accompanying AP examination at the end of the course.

== Testing ==
Cullman High School students exceed state and national averages on many standardized tests, including the ACT and Advanced Placement Exams.

The 2009 Cullman High School ACT score breakdown is shown below:

Subject Area	CHS Average	Alabama State Average
English	22.9	20.5
Math	21.8	19.5
Reading	22.5	20.7
Science	22.5	20.1
Composite	22.5	20.3

Cullman High School has had at least two Presidential Scholars, the last of which was in 1998.

== Notable alumni ==
- Wesley Britt (1981–), former University of Alabama football player, who played in the National Football League.
- Tom Drake, Former State Representative of Alabama, National Pro Wrestling Hall of Fame inductee.
- Kurt Heinecke, composer for Big Idea Productions who has created or co-created much of the popular music associated with VeggieTales.
- Brett Hestla (1973–), lead singer for Dark New Day; Former touring bassist for Creed
- Morgan Smith Goodwin, Actress; known for portraying “Red” the Wendy's Girl.
- Leslie Kelley, American football player
- Josh Rutledge, former Major League Baseball infielder
- Frank Stitt, nationally acclaimed and James Beard Award-winning chef.
- Keegan Thompson, Major League Baseball pitcher
- Wayne Trimble, American football player
- Zac Tubbs, former University of Arkansas football player, who played in the National Football League and the Indoor Football League.
