= Wayne Trimble =

American football player (born 1944)

No. 24
- Position: Defensive back

Personal information
- Born: December 10, 1944 (age 81); Cullman, Alabama, U.S.
- Listed height: 6 ft 3 in (1.91 m)
- Listed weight: 203 lb (92 kg)

Career information
- High school: Cullman (Alabama)
- College: Alabama (1963–1966)
- NFL draft: 1967: 4th round, 91st overall pick

Career history
- San Francisco 49ers (1967); St. Louis Cardinals (1968)*
- * Offseason or practice squad member only

Awards and highlights
- 2× National champion (1964, 1965)
- Stats at Pro Football Reference

Wayne Allen Trimble (born December 10, 1944) is an American former professional football defensive back who played one season with the San Francisco 49ers of the National Football League (NFL). He was selected by the 49ers in the fourth round of the 1967 NFL/AFL draft after playing college football at the University of Alabama.

== Early life and college ==
Wayne Allen Trimble was born on December 10, 1944, in Cullman, Alabama. He attended Cullman High School in Cullman.

Trimble was a member of the Alabama Crimson Tide of the University of Alabama from 1963 to 1966 and a three-year letterman from 1964 to 1966. He was listed as a running back from 1964 to 1965 and a quarterback in 1966. He rushed 13 times for 57 yards in 1964 while also catching one pass for 20 yards. In 1965, Trimble recorded five carries for 19 yards and four receptions for 59 yards. As a senior in 1966, he completed 19 of 47 passes (40.4%) for 334 yards, seven touchdowns, and two interceptions while also rushing 46 times for 142 yards. The Crimson Tide were national champions in both 1964 and 1965.

== Professional career ==
Trimble was selected by the San Francisco 49ers in the fourth round, with the 91st overall pick, of the 1967 NFL draft. He played in one game for the 49ers during the 1967 season. He was waived on August 28, 1968.

Trimble was then claimed off waivers by the St. Louis Cardinals. On September 5, it was reported that he had been released. He was later signed to the team's taxi squad. He quit the team on July 25, 1969.
