= Alvance Robinson =

American gridiron football player (born 1983)

North Carolina A&T Aggies
- Title: Pass Game coordinator & wide receivers coach

Personal information
- Born: May 13, 1983 (age 43); Dayton, Ohio, U.S.
- Listed height: 5 ft 9 in (1.75 m)
- Listed weight: 170 lb (77 kg)

Career information
- College: Alabama State
- NFL draft: 2006: undrafted

Career history

Playing
- Saskatchewan Roughriders (2006); Lubbock Renegades (2007–2008); Grand Rapids Rampage (2008); South Georgia Wildcats (2009); Milwaukee Iron (2010); Oklahoma City Yard Dawgz (2010); Utah Blaze (2011–2012); Philadelphia Soul (2013); Pittsburgh Power (2014); Portland Thunder (2014)

Coaching
- Marietta (2015–2016) Wide receivers coach; Davenport (2017–2018) Wide receivers coach; West Florida (2019–2020) Wide receivers coach; Gardner-Webb (2021–2022) Pass game coordinator & wide receivers coach; DC Defenders (2023) Wide receivers coach; West Florida (2024–2025) Offensive coordinator & wide receivers coach

Awards and highlights
- First-team All-SWAC (2005); Don Hansen 2nd Team NCAA 1AA All American (2005)

Career AFL statistics
- Receptions: 249
- Receiving yards: 3,247
- Receiving TDs: 62
- Kick return yards: 1,794
- Kick return TDs: 2
- Stats at ArenaFan.com

Alvance Robinson (born May 13, 1983) is an American former football wide receiver. He is the Pass Game Coordinator and wide receivers coach for the North Carolina A&T Aggies, positions he has held since 2026. He played college football at Alabama State University, earning First Team All-Southwestern Athletic Conference in 2005. He was signed as a free agent by the Saskatchewan Roughriders in 2006. He was recently wide receivers coach for the DC Defenders of the United Football League (UFL). On July 21, 2026 he was inducted into the Alabama State University Athletics Hall of Fame.

== Coaching career ==
Robinson was hired by the DC Defenders on September 13, 2022.

On February 23, 2024, Robinson was hired by the University of West Florida as their offensive coordinator and wide receivers coach.
