= WFMH (AM) =

Cullman, Alabama; United States
- Frequency: 1340 kHz
- Branding: Sports 1340

Programming
- Format: Sports

Ownership
- Owner: Jimmy Dale Media
- Sister stations: WMCJ

History
- First air date: October 1, 1946 (as WKUL)
- Last air date: September 2024
- Former call signs: WKUL (1946–1982); WXXR (1982–2002)

Technical information
- Licensing authority: FCC
- Facility ID: 24577
- Class: C
- Power: 670 watts
- Transmitter coordinates: 34°10′49.4″N 86°51′59″W

Links
- Public license information: Public file; LMS

WFMH (1340 AM) was a radio station licensed to serve Cullman, Alabama, United States. The station was owned by Jimmy Dale Media. It aired a sports format.

== History ==
The station first signed on the air as WKUL on October 1, 1946, under the ownership of the Cullman Broadcasting Company.

During the 1980s the station was WXXR, owned and operated by Piney Hills Broadcasting. In the mid-1990s the station was acquired by Good Earth Broadcasting which then added a simulcast on WXXR-FM 95.5 in 1996.

In 1998, 101.1 FM in Cullman, then WFMH-FM, was leased to a group in Birmingham who wanted to broadcast contemporary Christian music (Reality 101). The station was leased and later sold and funds from the transaction were used to purchase WXXR and WXXR-FM from Good Earth Broadcasting.

The station was assigned the callsign WFMH by the Federal Communications Commission on September 20, 2002. In May 2004, Voice of Cullman LLC (Clark P. Jones, member/manager) agreed to transfer the license for WFMH and WFMH-FM to Williams Communications (Walton E. Williams Jr., president/director). The two stations sold for a reported total of $2.45 million.

In May 2008, a deal was reached to transfer control of this station from Williams Communications, Inc. to Walton E. Williams III. The FCC approved the deal on July 1, 2008, and the transaction was consummated on the same day.

In August 2008, Walton E. Williams III reached an agreement to sell WFMH and sister station WMCJ to Jimmy Dale Media LLC. The two stations sold for a reported total of $375,000. The deal was approved by the FCC on October 6, 2008.

Jimmy Dale Media surrendered the licenses of WFMH and WMCJ in September 2024; at the time of the closure, the two stations were simulcasting a sports radio format. The Federal Communications Commission cancelled the station's license on October 1, 2024.
