= Alan Turner (gridiron football) =

American gridiron football player (born 1984)

No. 14
- Position: Wide receiver

Personal information
- Born: October 10, 1984 (age 42); Normal, Illinois, U.S.
- Listed height: 6 ft 0 in (1.83 m)
- Listed weight: 200 lb (91 kg)

Career information
- College: Southern Illinois University Carbondale
- NFL draft: 2008: undrafted

Career history
- 2008: New York Jets*
- 2009: Edmonton Eskimos*
- 2010: Chicago Rush
- 2011: Philadelphia Soul
- * Offseason or practice squad member only

Alan Turner (born October 10, 1984) is an American former professional football wide receiver. He was signed by the New York Jets as an undrafted free agent in 2008. He played college football for the Southern Illinois Salukis.

Turner was also a member of the Edmonton Eskimos, Chicago Rush, and Philadelphia Soul.
