= United National Gridiron League =

Proposed american football minor league

- Sport: American football
- Founded: 2007
- Founder: Marvin Tomlin
- Folded: 2010
- CEO: Joe Cribbs
- No. of teams: 8
- Country: United States
- Website: Official Site

The United National Gridiron League (UNGL) was a proposed professional american football minor league. The league was formed in August 2007 and was originally called the United National Football League.

The league's inaugural draft took place January 8–9, 2009. The league had planned to begin the season on February 8, 2009 but, after a multiple postponements of the kick-off date, the inaugural season was pushed back to March 2010, and later cancelled altogether, because of financing problems.

== Financial struggles ==
The league pushed back its season three times. According to the UNGL's Web site, the start of the season had been pushed back from February to May because of a "dishonest commitment made by the league's primary investor. reported in February that the investor "suddenly withdrew its $15 million contribution." There has also been scrutiny surrounding the Salem team. The League originally struck a deal with the City of Salem for use of their Stadium in April 2009, then 10 days later canceled their season. Then in August 2009 the League announced that Salem would be home to a team in 2010. That was news to Salem officials, who learned about it when the press release was posted on roanoke.com.

Salem civic facilities director Carey Harveycutter said UNGL officials have not been talking with him about getting back in business with the city. CEO Marvin Tomlin's response, to the surprise of Salem officials, was "We are very interested in coming and playing in Salem, We haven't confirmed the facility yet out there in Salem, but we are very eager to talk. I just wanted everybody to know that this is where we want to come back to play."

An August 2009 news release said there was to be teams in Miami; Columbus, Ga.; Birmingham, Ala.; and Akron, Ohio, as well as teams in unnamed cities in North Carolina, Texas and Louisiana. Tomlin refused to say how many actual facility agreements he had with those cities for 2010.

Harveycutter called UNGL president Ben Eison on Friday, August 21, 2009 after learning of the league's announcement. He said Eison told him that Friday, "We're not announcing facilities; we're just announcing areas, and you should not read into it that they have contracted any facilities."

Harveycutter said he told Eison, "As I left it last spring, if you will execute the contract and provide the cash deposits called for, then we will talk."

Tomlin refused to name his investors or say how much financing was in place. "Our financing is strong," Tomlin said. The league had planned to debut last February, but the start of the 2009 season was postponed because of a "dishonest commitment made by the league's primary investor," according to an announcement that used to be on the UNGL's Web site.

The league had originally turned down Salem in favor of Norfolk, but the UNGL called Harveycutter in April to say that Norfolk didn't work out and that the league would be starting its season in May.

The UNGL reached a deal with Salem, but 10 days later—on April 27—a UNGL official e-mailed Harveycutter to say the league was suspending operations for the 2009 season. April 27 had been the deadline to mail the contract back to Salem, along with a $10,000 down payment.

On March 10, 2010, the league announced via an email to the media, that it was canceling the 2010 season and suspending league operations indefinitely. In the statement to the media, the league said, "We were very hopeful that this announcement would not have to be made (or at the very least we might have been able to delay our season start a bit), if we had been able to secure certain assurances and arrangements from the investor group we had been working with these past 4 months. Unfortunately, as of this past Monday, we were unable to confirm these arrangements which prohibited us, in good conscience, from announcing our league start date, along with the other announcements everyone was expecting regarding our player draft, camp report date, etc.."

== League structure ==
The United National Gridiron League was to have the same professional rules as the NFL. The teams were named and selected by the Board of Directors. All teams were slated to be owned by the league.

== Inaugural draft ==
On January 8 and 9, 2009 the UNGL held its inaugural draft. Those selected were primarily college players, however the draft also included players from other leagues, such as the All-American Football League (AAFL), Arena Football League (AFL), American Indoor Football Association (AIFA), Continental Indoor Football League (CIFL), af2, Indoor Football League (IFL), and some from practice squads of National Football League (NFL) franchises.

== Teams ==
The teams planned for the 2010 season were:

- Alabama Blackbirds (Birmingham, Alabama)
- Dallas Bluestorm (Dallas, Texas)
- Georgia Slashers (Columbus, Georgia)
- Louisiana Lancers (Shreveport, Louisiana)
- Miami Scorchers (Miami, Florida)
- North Carolina Comets (Winston-Salem, North Carolina)
- Ohio Marauders (Massillon, Ohio)
- Virginia Swarm (Salem, Virginia)
