= David Miller =

David Miller may refer to:

== Academics and scientists ==
- David Miller (engineer), aerospace engineer at MIT and NASA
- David Miller (entomologist) (1890–1973), New Zealand entomologist, university lecturer and scientific administrator
- David C. Miller (1917–1997), American epidemiologist who cared for Albert Schweitzer
- David Miller (philosopher) (1942–2024), British philosopher
- David Miller (political theorist) (born 1946), professor at Oxford
- David Miller (physician), pioneer in the home birth movement in Australia
- David Miller (sociologist) (born 1964), British sociologist
- D. A. Miller (born 1948), professor at UC Berkeley
- David A. B. Miller (born 1954), professor at Stanford University
- David Philip Miller (born 1953), social historian of science
- David S. Miller (born 1974), computer programmer
- David W. Miller, scholar of the "faith at work" movement

== Arts and entertainment ==
- David Miller (architect) (born 1944), Seattle architect
- David Miller (director) (1909–1992), American film director
- David Miller (American musician) (1883–1953), American country musician
- David Miller (Australian musician) (born 1943), Australian pianist
- David Miller (painter) (born c. 1950), Australian artist
- David Miller (tenor) (born 1973), operatic tenor and member of the band Il Divo
- David Miller (cinematographer), American cinematographer
- David Alan Miller (born 1961), conductor
- David Humphreys Miller (1918–1992), American artist, writer and film advisor specialising in the Plains Indians
- David Lee Miller (director) (born 1955), American film director, screenwriter and producer
- Dave Miller (producer) (David L. Miller, 1925–1985), American record producer
- David Prince Miller (1809–1873), British showman and magician
- David Biscuit Miller (born 1961), American blues bassist, singer and songwriter
- David Wiley Miller (born 1951), American cartoonist
- David Miller, pseudonym David Shankbone, American photojournalist

== Literature ==
- David Miller (editor), British writer and journalist
- David Miller (poet) (born 1950), writer, poet, literary critic, and editor
- David Lee Miller (academic) (born 1951), American writer and professor

== Military ==
- David N. Miller (born 1971), United States Space Force general
- David V. Miller (1919–2016), U.S. Air Force general

== Politics, government & diplomacy ==
- David Miller (Canadian politician) (born 1958), former mayor of Toronto and later president of WWF-Canada
- David Wynn Miller (1949–2019), American pseudolegal theorist active in the sovereign citizen movement
- David Miller (Iowa politician) (born 1946), American politician
- David Miller (public servant) (1857–1934), senior Australian public servant
- David Miller (Wyoming politician) (born 1953), American politician
- David A. Miller (born 1948), mayor of Lubbock, Texas
- David E. Miller (born 1962), member of the Illinois House of Representatives
- David Charles Miller Jr. (born 1942), American lawyer and diplomat
- David Hunter Miller (1875–1961), American lawyer and an expert on treaties, officer at the US state department
- David Miller (Kansas politician) (born 1949), former chairman of the Kansas Republican Party
- David Miller (New Hampshire politician), state representative

== Sports ==
- David Miller (baseball) (born 1973), American college baseball coach
- David Miller (Australian cricketer) (1870–1943), Australian cricketer
- David Miller (English cricketer) (born 1974), former English cricketer
- David Miller (South African cricketer) (born 1989), South African cricketer
- David Miller (American football) (born 1984), defensive end
- David Miller (Australian footballer) (born 1957), VFL footballer for Richmond
- David Miller (darts player) (born 1955), American professional darts player
- David Miller (harness racing) (born 1964), American harness racing driver and trainer
- David Miller (ice hockey) (1924–1996), Canadian ice hockey player
- David Miller (judoka) (born 1961), Canadian judoka
- David Miller (sailor) (born 1943), Canadian sailor

== Others ==
- David Miller (gangster), also known as Davy "Yiddles" Miller, a member of the Chicago gang Ragen's Colts
- David Miller (minister), Scottish minister
- David Miller (preacher) (1946–2024), American itinerant preacher
- David Earl Miller (1957–2018), American convicted murderer
- Davy Miller, Chicagoan gangster.

== See also ==
- Dave Miller (disambiguation)
- David Millar (disambiguation)
- David E Miller Hill, a summit in Utah
