= Christian views on poverty and wealth =

Different opinions that Christians have held about material riches

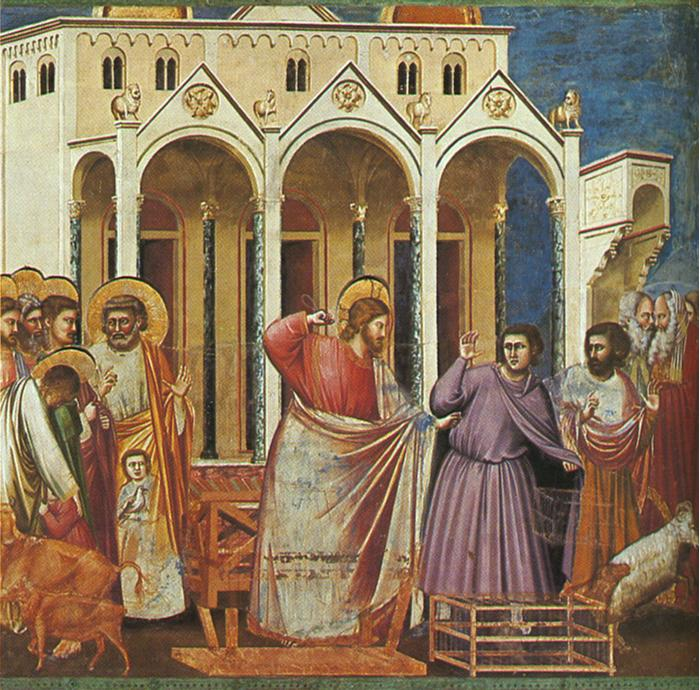
Jesus casting out the money changers from the Temple by Giotto, 14th century

Christian views on poverty and wealth vary. At one end of the spectrum is a view which casts wealth and materialism as an evil to be avoided and even combated. At the other end is a view which casts prosperity and well-being as a blessing from God.

Many taking the former position address the topic in relation to the modern neoliberal capitalism that shapes the Western world. American theologian John B. Cobb has argued that the "economism that rules the West and through it much of the East" is directly opposed to traditional Christian doctrine. Cobb invokes the teaching of Jesus that "man cannot serve both God and Mammon (wealth)". He asserts that it is obvious that "Western society is organized in the service of wealth" and thus wealth has triumphed over God in the West. Scottish theologian Jack Mahoney has characterized the sayings of Jesus in Mark 10:23–27 as having "imprinted themselves so deeply on the Christian community through the centuries that those who are well off, or even comfortably off, often feel uneasy and troubled in conscience."

Some Christians argue that a proper understanding of Christian teachings on wealth and poverty needs to take a larger view where the accumulation of wealth is not the central focus of one's life but rather a resource to foster the "good life". Professor David W. Miller has constructed a three-part rubric which presents three prevalent attitudes among Protestants towards wealth. According to this rubric, Protestants have variously viewed wealth as: (1) an offense to the Christian faith, (2) an obstacle to faith, and, (3) the outcome of faith.

== Wealth and faith ==
=== Wealth as an offense to faith ===
According to historian Alan S. Kahan, there is a strand of Christianity that views the wealthy man as "especially sinful". In this strand of Christianity, Kahan asserts, the day of judgment is viewed as a time when "the social order will be turned upside down and [...] the poor will turn out to be the ones truly blessed."

David Miller suggests that this view is similar to that of the third century Manicheans who saw the spiritual world as being good and the material world as evil, viewing the two as being in irreconcilable conflict with each other. Thus, this strand of Christianity exhorts Christians to renounce material and worldly pleasures in order to follow Jesus. As an example, Miller cites Jesus' injunction to his disciples to "take nothing for the journey."

=== Wealth as an obstacle to faith ===
According to David Miller, Martin Luther, the father of the Lutheran tradition, viewed Mammon (or the desire for wealth) as "the most common idol on earth". Miller cites Jesus' encounter with the rich ruler as an example of when wealth is an obstacle to faith. According to Miller, it is not the rich man's wealth per se that is the obstacle but rather the man's reluctance to give up that wealth in order to follow Jesus. Miller cites Paul's observation in 1st Timothy that, "people who want to get rich fall into temptation and a trap and into many foolish and harmful desires that plunge men into ruin and destruction." Paul continues on with the observation that "the love of money is the root of all evil." Miller emphasizes that "it is the love of money that is the obstacle to faith, not the money itself."

Jesus looked around and said to his disciples, "How hard it is for the rich to enter the kingdom of God!" The disciples were amazed at his words. But Jesus said again, "Children, how hard it is to enter the kingdom of God! It is easier for a camel to go through the eye of a needle than for someone who is rich to enter the kingdom of God."

— Mark 10:23–25, New Revised Standard Version

Kahan cites Jesus' injunction against amassing material wealth as an example that the "good [Christian] life was one of poverty and charity, storing up treasures in heaven instead of earth."

Do not store up for yourselves treasures on earth, where moth and rust destroy, and where thieves break in and steal. But store up for yourselves treasures in heaven, where moth and rust do not destroy, and where thieves do not break in and steal. For where your treasure is, there your heart will be also.

— Matthew 6:19–21, NRSV

Jesus counsels his followers to remove from their lives those things which cause them to sin, saying "If your hand causes you to sin, cut it off. It is better for you to enter life maimed than to go with two hands into hell, where the fire never goes out." In order to remove the desire for wealth and material possessions as an obstacle to faith, some Christians have taken vows of poverty. Christianity has a long tradition of voluntary poverty which is manifested in the form of asceticism, charity and almsgiving.

Kahan argues that Christianity is unique because it sparked the beginning of a phenomenon which he calls the "Great Renunciation" in which "millions of people would renounce sex and money in God's name."

Roman Catholic theologian Thomas Aquinas wrote "Greed is a sin against God, just as all mortal sins, in as much as man condemns things eternal for the sake of temporal things."

In Roman Catholicism, poverty is one of the evangelical counsels. Pope Benedict XVI distinguishes "poverty chosen" (the poverty of spirit proposed by Jesus), and "poverty to be fought" (unjust and imposed poverty). He considers that the moderation implied in the former favors solidarity, and is a necessary condition so as to fight effectively to eradicate the abuse of the latter. Certain religious institutes and societies of Apostolic life also take a vow of extreme poverty. For example, the Franciscan orders have traditionally foregone all individual and corporate forms of ownership; in another example, the Catholic Worker Movement advocates voluntary poverty. Christians, such as New Monastics, may choose to reject personal wealth and follow an ascetic lifestyle, in part as a protest against "a church and public that embraces wealth, luxury and ostentatious power."

=== Wealth as an outcome of faith ===
One line of Protestant thinking views the pursuit of wealth as not only acceptable but as a religious calling or duty. This perspective is generally ascribed to Calvinist and Puritan theologies, which view hard work and frugal lifestyles as spiritual acts in themselves. John Wesley, the father of the Methodist tradition, was a strong proponent of gaining wealth, according to his famous "Sermon 50," in which he said, "gain all you can, save all you can and give all you can." John Wesley and his Methodists were noted for their consistently large contributions to charity in the form of churches, hospitals and schools.

Included among those who view wealth as an outcome of faith are modern-day preachers and authors who propound prosperity theology, teaching that God promises wealth and abundance to those who will believe in him and follow his laws. Prosperity theology (also known as the "health and wealth gospel") is a Christian religious belief whose proponents claim the Bible teaches that financial blessing is the will of God for Christians. Most teachers of prosperity theology maintain that a combination of faith, positive speech, and donations to specific Christian ministries will always cause an increase in material wealth for those who practice these actions. Prosperity theology is almost always taught in conjunction with continuationism.

Prosperity theology first came to prominence in the United States during the Healing Revivals in the 1950s. Some commentators have linked the genesis of prosperity theology with the influence of the New Thought movement. It later figured prominently in the Word of Faith movement and 1980s televangelism. In the 1990s and 2000s, it became accepted by many influential leaders in the charismatic movement and has been promoted by Christian missionaries throughout the world. It has been harshly criticized by leaders of mainstream evangelicalism as a non-scriptural doctrine or as an outright heresy.

== Precursors to Christianity ==
Professor Cosimo Perrotta describes the early Christian period as one which saw "the meeting and clash of three great cultures: the Classical, the Hebrew (of the Old Testament) and the Christian." Perrotta describes the cultures as having radically different views of money and wealth. Whereas the Hebrew culture prized material wealth, the Classical and Christian cultures either held it in contempt or preached indifference to it. However, Perrotta points out that the motivation of the Classical and Christian cultures for their attitudes were very different and thus the logical implications of the attitudes resulted in different outcomes.

=== Jewish attitudes in the Old Testament ===
Perrotta characterizes the attitude of the Jews as expressed in the Old Testament scriptures as being "completely different from the classical view." He points out that servile and hired work was not scorned by the Jews of the Old Testament as it was by Greco-Roman thinkers. Instead, such work was protected by biblical commandments to pay workers on time and not to cheat them. The poor were protected from being exploited when in debt. Perrotta asserts that the goal of these commandments was "not only to protect the poor but also to prevent the excessive accumulation of wealth in a few hands." In essence, the poor man is "protected by God". However, Perrotta points out that poverty is not admired nor is it considered a positive value by the writers of the Old Testament. The poor are protected because the weak should be protected from exploitation.

Perrotta points out that material wealth is highly valued in the Old Testament; the Hebrews seek it and God promises to bless them with it if they will follow his commandments. Joseph Francis Kelly writes that biblical writers leave no doubt that God enabled men such as Abraham, Isaac, Jacob and Solomon to achieve wealth and that this wealth was a sign of divine favor. However, Kelly also points out that the Old Testament insisted that the rich aid the poor. Prophets such as Amos castigated the rich for oppressing the poor and crushing the needy. In summary, Kelly writes that, "the Old Testament saw wealth as something good but warned the wealthy not to use their position to harm those with less. The rich had an obligation to alleviate the sufferings of the poor."

== New Testament ==
Blessed are you who are poor, for yours is the kingdom of God.

— Luke 6:20

=== The Gospels ===
Jesus explicitly condemns excessive love of wealth as an intrinsic evil in various passages in the Gospels, especially in Luke (Luke 16:10–15 being an especially clear example). He also consistently warns of the danger of riches as a hindrance to favor with God; as in the Parable of the Sower, where it is said:

And the cares of this world, and the deceitfulness of riches, and the lusts of other things entering in; it chokes the Word, which becomes unfruitful

— Mark 4:19, NRSV

Jesus makes Mammon a personification of riches, one in opposition to God, and which claims a person's service and loyalty as God does. However, Jesus rejects the possibility of dual service on the part of humanity, stating that no one can serve both God and Mammon.

In the story of Jesus and the rich young man, the young ruler's wealth inhibits him from following Jesus and thereby attaining the Kingdom. Jesus comments on the young man's discouragement thus:

"How hard it is for the rich to enter the kingdom of God! Indeed, it is easier for a camel to go through the eye of a needle than for someone who is rich to enter the kingdom of God." Those who heard this were astonished, "Who then can be saved?", they asked. Jesus replied, "What is impossible with man is possible with God."

— Matthew 19:23–27, NRSV

In the Sermon on the Mount and the Sermon on the Plain, Jesus exhorts his hearers to sell their earthly goods and give to the poor, and so provide themselves with "a treasure in heaven that will never fail, where no thief comes near and no moth destroys" (Luke 12:33); and he adds "For where your treasure is, there will your heart be also." (Luke 12:34)

In the Parable of the Rich Fool, Jesus tells the story of a rich man who decides to rest from all his labors, saying to himself:

And I will say to myself 'You have plenty of grain laid up for many years. Take life easy; eat, drink and be merry.' But God spoke to him, saying 'You fool! This very night your life will be required of you. Then who will get all that you have prepared for yourself?'

— Luke 12:16–20

Jesus adds, "This is how it will be with whoever stores up things for themselves but is not rich toward God." (Luke 12:21)

Jesus and Zacchaeus (Luke 19:1–10) is an example of storing up heavenly treasure, and being rich toward God. The repentant tax collector Zacchaeus not only welcomes Jesus into his house but joyfully promises to give half of his possessions to the poor, and to rebate overpayments four times over if he defrauded anyone (Luke 19:8).

Luke strongly ties the right use of riches to discipleship; and securing heavenly treasure is linked with caring for the poor, the naked and the hungry, for God is supposed to have a special interest in the poor. This theme is consistent with God's protection and care of the poor in the Old Testament. Thus, Jesus cites the words of the prophet Isaiah (Isaiah 61:1–2) in proclaiming his mission:

The Spirit of the Lord is upon Me, because He has anointed Me to preach the Gospel to the poor, to heal the brokenhearted, to preach deliverance to the captives, and recovery of sight to the blind, to set at liberty them that are bruised, to proclaim the acceptable year of the Lord.

— Luke 4:18–19

The Gospel of Luke expresses particular concern for the poor as the subjects of Jesus' compassion and ministry. In Luke's version of the Beatitudes, the poor are blessed as the inheritors of God's kingdom (Luke 6:20), even as the corresponding curses are pronounced to the rich (Luke 6:24–26).

God's special interest in the poor is also expressed in the theme of the eschatological "great reversal" of fortunes between the rich and the poor in The Magnificat (Luke 1:46–55):

He has shown the might of his arm:
and has scattered the proud, in the conceit of their hearts.
He has pulled down the mighty from their thrones,
and exalted the lowly.
He has filled the hungry with good things;
and the rich has sent empty away.

— Luke 1:51–53

It is also expressed in Jesus' repeated use of the phrase "many that are first shall be last, and the last shall be first" and similar figures of speech.

In the Parable of the Wedding Feast, it is "the poor, the crippled, the blind and the lame" who become God's honored guests, while others reject the invitation because of their earthly cares and possessions (Luke 14:7–14).

=== Acts of the Apostles ===
Luke's concern for the rich and the poor continues in Acts with a greater focus on the unity of the nascent Christian communities. The two famous passages (Acts 2:43–45; Acts 4:32–37), which have been appealed to throughout history as the "normative ideal" of the community of goods for Christians, rather describe the extent of fellowship (koinōnia) in Jerusalem community as a part of distinctive Christian identity. Acts also portrays both positive and negative uses of wealth: those who practiced almsgiving and generosity to the poor (Acts 9:36; Acts 10:2–4) and those who gave priority to money over the needs of others (Acts 5:1–11; Acts 8:14–24).

=== Epistles ===
For Paul, riches mainly denotes the character and activity of God and Christ – spiritual blessings and/of salvation – (e.g., Romans 2:4; Romans 9:23; 2 Corinthians 8:9; Ephesians 1:7–18; Ephesians 2:4–7) although he occasionally refers to typical Jewish piety and Greco-Roman moral teachings of the time, such as generosity (Romans 12:8–13; 2 Corinthians 8:2; Ephesians 4:28; 1 Timothy 6:17) and hospitality (1 Timothy 5:10) with warnings against pride (1 Timothy 6:17) and greed (1 Corinthians 5:11; 1 Timothy 3:8). 1 Timothy 6:10 seems to reflect a popular Cynic-Stoic moral teaching of the period: "the love of money is a root of all kinds of evil." Paul's focus of generosity is devoted to the collection for the Church in Jerusalem (Gal. 2.10; 1 Cor. 16.1–4; 2 Cor 8.1 – 9.15; Rom. 15.25–31) as an important symbol of unity between Jewish and gentile believers with an appeal to material and spiritual reciprocity. It is also noteworthy that Paul's teaching in 1 Tim 6:17 implies there were rich believers in the Early Church.

A concept related to the accumulation of wealth is Worldliness, which is denounced by the Epistles of James and John: "Don't you know that friendship with the world is enmity with God? Therefore whoever wishes to be a friend of the world makes himself an enemy of God" (Ja 4.4). The first letter of John says, in a similar vein: "Do not love the world or the things in the world. If anyone loves the world, the love of the Father is not in him" (1 Jn 2:15).

The Epistle of James also stands out for its vehement condemnation of the oppressive rich, who were presumably outsiders to the Christian community, which mainly consisted of the poor. Adopting the Psalter's convention of the "wicked rich" and the "pious poor" and adopting its voice, James indicts the rich with the sins of hoarding wealth, fraudulently withholding wages, corruption, pride, luxury, covetousness and murder; and denounces the folly of their actions in the face of the imminent Day of Judgement.

=== Revelation ===
Finally, the Revelation treats earthly riches and commercial activities with great ambivalence. While Jesus exposes the true poverty of the Laodicean church's boast of wealth (3.17–18), he presents himself as the true source and dispenser of wealth (cf. 2 Cor. 8.13–15). Later, earthly riches and businesses activities are associated with the sins of Babylon, the earthly power of evil with self-accorded glory and luxury, whose fall is imminent (18.1–24). However, the Revelation also portrays the New Jerusalem with a lavish materialistic description, made of pure gold decorated with "every kind of precious stone" (21.18–19).

== Early Christianity ==
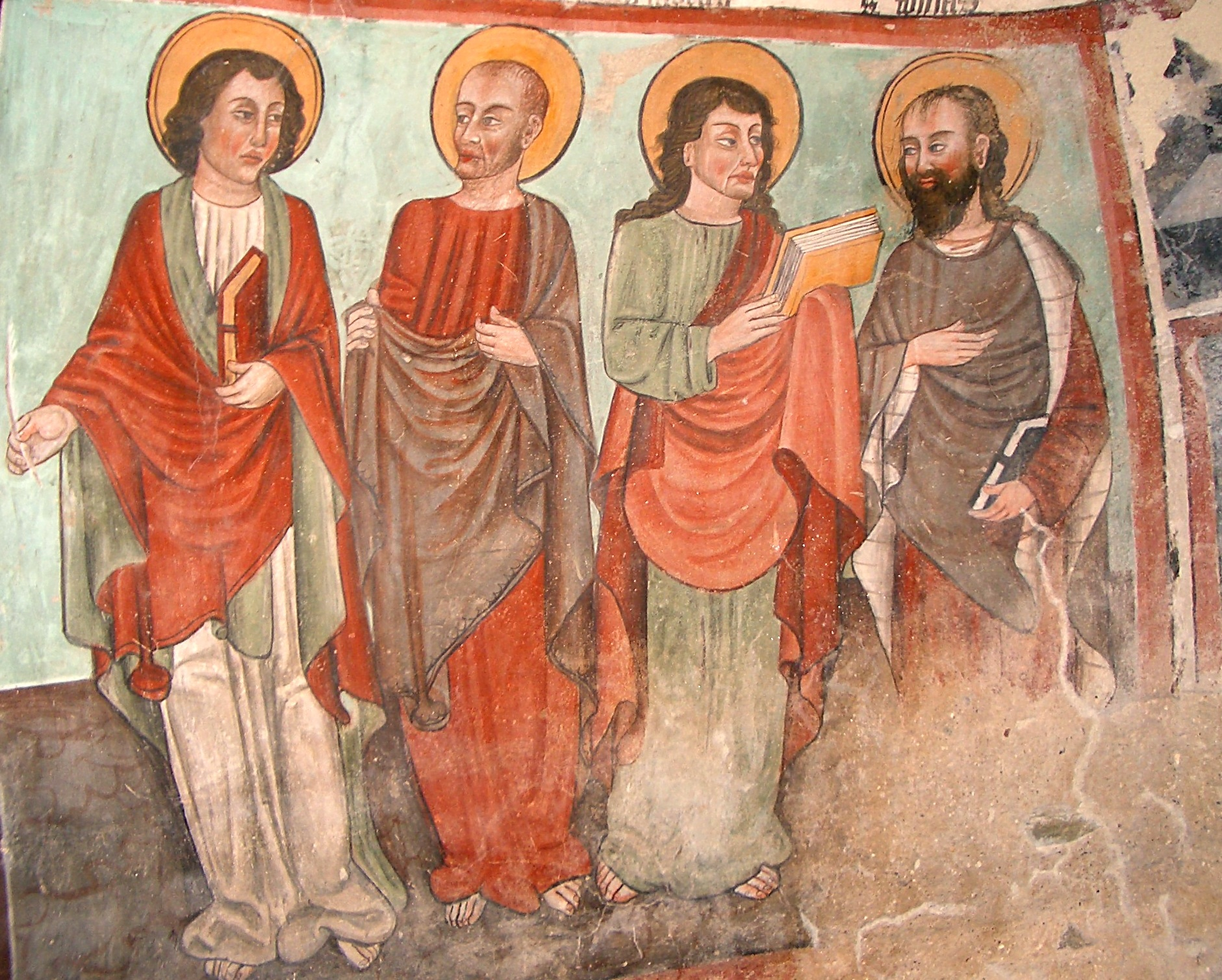
15th-century fresco of the Apostles, Turin, Italy

Early Christianity appears to have adopted many of the ethical themes found in the Hebrew Bible. However, the teachings of Jesus and his apostles as presented in the New Testament exhibit an "acute sensitivity to the needs of the disadvantaged" that Frederick sees as "adding a critical edge to Christian teaching where wealth and the pursuit of economic gain are concerned.

Alan Kahan points to the fact that Jesus was a poor man as emblematic of "a revolution in the way poverty and wealth were viewed." This is not to say that Christian attitudes borrowed nothing from Christianity's Greco-Roman and Jewish precursors. Kahan acknowledges that, "Christian theology absorbed those Greco-Roman attitudes towards money that complemented its own." However, as Kahan puts it, "Never before had any god been conceived of as poor." He characterizes Christian charity as being "different in kind from the generosity praised in the classical tradition."

Kahan contrasts the attitudes of early Christians with those of classical thinkers such as Seneca. The New Testament urges Christians to sell material possessions and give the money to the poor. According to Kahan, the goal of Christian charity is equality, a notion which is absent in the Greco-Roman attitudes toward the poor.

Cosimo Perrotta characterizes the Christian attitude vis-a-vis poverty and work as being "much closer to the tradition of the Old Testament than to classical culture." However, Irving Kristol suggests that Christianity's attitude towards wealth is markedly different from that of the Hebrews in the Old Testament. Kristol asserts that traditional Judaism has no precepts that parallel the Christian assertion that it is difficult for a rich man to get into heaven.

Perrotta characterizes Christianity as not disdaining material wealth as did classical thinkers such as Socrates, the Cynics and Seneca and yet not desiring it as the Old Testament writers did.

== Patristic era ==
Many of the Church Fathers condemned private property and advocated the communal ownership of property as an ideal for Christians to follow. However, they believed early on that this was an ideal which was not very practical in everyday life and viewed private property as a "necessary evil resulting from the fall of man." American theologian Robert Grant noted that, while almost all of the Church Fathers condemn the "love of money for its own sake and insist upon the positive duty of almsgiving", none of them seems to have advocated the general application of Jesus' counsel to the rich young man viz. to give away all of his worldly possessions in order to follow him.

Augustine urged Christians to turn away from the desire for material wealth and success. He argued that the accumulation of wealth was not a worthy goal for Christians.

Although Clement of Alexandria counselled that property be used for the good of the public and the community, he sanctioned private ownership of property and the accumulation of wealth. Lactantius wrote that "the ownership of property contains the material of both vices and virtues but communism [communitas] contains nothing but license for vice."

== Medieval Europe ==
By the beginning of the medieval era, the Christian paternalist ethic was "thoroughly entrenched in the culture of Western Europe." Individualist and materialist pursuits such as greed, avarice, and the accumulation of wealth were condemned as un-Christian.

Madeleine Gray describes the medieval system of social welfare as one that was "organized through the Church and underpinned by ideas on the spiritual value of poverty.

According to historian Alan Kahan, Christian theologians regularly condemned merchants. For example, he cites Honorius of Autun who wrote that merchants had little chance of going to heaven whereas farmers were likely to be saved. He further cites Gratian who wrote that "the man who buys something in order that he may gain by selling it again unchanged and as he bought it, that man is of the buyers and sellers who are cast forth from God's temple."

However, the medieval era saw a change in the attitudes of Christians towards the accumulation of wealth. Thomas Aquinas defined avarice not simply as a desire for wealth but as an immoderate desire for wealth. Aquinas wrote that it was acceptable to have "external riches" to the extent that they were necessary for him to maintain his "condition of life". This argued that the nobility had a right to more wealth than the peasantry. What was unacceptable was for a person to seek to more wealth than was appropriate to one's station or aspire to a higher station in life. The period saw fierce debates on whether Christ owned property.

The Church evolved into the single most powerful institution in medieval Europe, more powerful than any single potentate. The Church was so wealthy that, at one time, it owned as much as 20–30% of the land in Western Europe in an era when land was the primary form of wealth. Over time, this wealth and power led to abuses and corruption.

=== Monasticism ===
As early as the 6th and 7th centuries, the issue of property and move of wealth in the event of outside aggression had been addressed in monastic communities via agreements such as the Consensoria Monachorum. By the eleventh century, Benedictine monasteries had become wealthy, owing to the generous donations of monarchs and nobility. Abbots of the larger monasteries achieved international prominence. In reaction to this wealth and power, a reform movement arose which sought a simpler, more austere monastic life in which monks worked with their hands rather than acting as landlords over serfs.

At the beginning of the 13th century, mendicant orders such as the Dominicans and the Franciscans departed from the practice of existing religious orders by taking vows of extreme poverty and maintaining an active presence preaching and serving the community rather than withdrawing into monasteries. Francis of Assisi viewed poverty as a key element of the imitation of Christ who was "poor at birth in the manger, poor as he lived in the world, and naked as he died on the cross".

The visible public commitment of the Franciscans to poverty provided to the laity a sharp contrast to the wealth and power of the Church, provoking "awkward questions".

=== Early attempts at reform ===
Widespread corruption led to calls for reform which called into question the interdependent relationship of Church and State power. Reformers sharply criticised the lavish wealth of churches and the mercenary behavior of the clergy. For example, reformer Peter Damian labored to remind the Church hierarchy and the laity that love of money was the root of much evil.

== Reformation ==
The rising capitalistic middle class resented the drain of their wealth to the Church; in northern Europe, they supported local reformers against the corruption, rapacity and venality which they viewed as originating in Rome.

=== Calvinism ===
One school of thought attributes Calvinism with setting the stage for the later development of capitalism in northern Europe. In this view, elements of Calvinism represented a revolt against the medieval condemnation of usury and, implicitly, of profit in general. Such a connection was advanced in influential works by R. H. Tawney (1880–1962) and by Max Weber (1864–1920).

Calvin criticised the use of certain passages of scripture invoked by people opposed to the charging of interest. He reinterpreted some of these passages, and suggested that others of them had been rendered irrelevant by changed conditions. He also dismissed the argument (based upon the writings of Aristotle) that it is wrong to charge interest for money because money itself is barren. He said that the walls and the roof of a house are barren, too, but it is permissible to charge someone for allowing him to use them. In the same way, money can be made fruitful.

== Puritanism ==
For Puritans, work was not simply arduous drudgery required to sustain life. Joseph Conforti describes the Puritan attitude toward work as taking on "the character of a vocation – a calling through which one improved the world, redeemed time, glorified God, and followed life's pilgrimage toward salvation." Gayraud Wilmore characterizes the Puritan social ethic as focused on the "acquisition and proper stewardship of wealth as outward symbols of God's favor and the consequent salvation of the individual." Puritans were urged to be producers rather than consumers and to invest their profits to create more jobs for industrious workers who would thus be enabled to "contribute to a productive society and a vital, expansive church." Puritans were counseled to seek sufficient comfort and economic self-sufficiency but to avoid the pursuit of luxuries or the accumulation of material wealth for its own sake.

== The rise of capitalism ==
In two journal articles published in 1904–05, German sociologist Max Weber propounded a thesis that Reformed (i.e., Calvinist) Protestantism had engendered the character traits and values that under-girded modern capitalism. The English translation of these articles were published in book form in 1930 as The Protestant Ethic and the Spirit of Capitalism. Weber argued that capitalism in northern Europe evolved because the Protestant (particularly Calvinist) ethic influenced large numbers of people to engage in work in the secular world, developing their own enterprises and engaging in trade and the accumulation of wealth for investment. In other words, the Protestant work ethic was a force behind an unplanned and uncoordinated mass action that influenced the development of capitalism.

Weber's work focused scholars on the question of the uniqueness of Western civilization and the nature of its economic and social development. Scholars have sought to explain the fact that economic growth has been much more rapid in Northern and Western Europe and its overseas offshoots than in other parts of the world including those where the Catholic and Orthodox Churches have been dominant over Protestantism. Some have observed that explosive economic growth occurred at roughly the same time, or soon after, these areas experienced the rise of Protestant religions. Stanley Engerman asserts that, although some scholars may argue that the two phenomena are unrelated, many would find it difficult to accept such a thesis.

John Chamberlain wrote that "Christianity tends to lead to a capitalistic mode of life whenever siege conditions do not prevail... [capitalism] is not Christian in and by itself; it is merely to say that capitalism is a material by-product of the Mosaic Law."

Rodney Stark propounds the theory that Christian rationality is the primary driver behind the success of capitalism and the Rise of the West.

John B. Cobb argues that the "economism that rules the West and through it much of the East" is directly opposed to traditional Christian doctrine. Cobb invokes the teaching of Jesus that "man cannot serve both God and Mammon (wealth)". He asserts that it is obvious that "Western society is organized in the service of wealth" and thus wealth has triumphed over God in the West.

== Usury ==
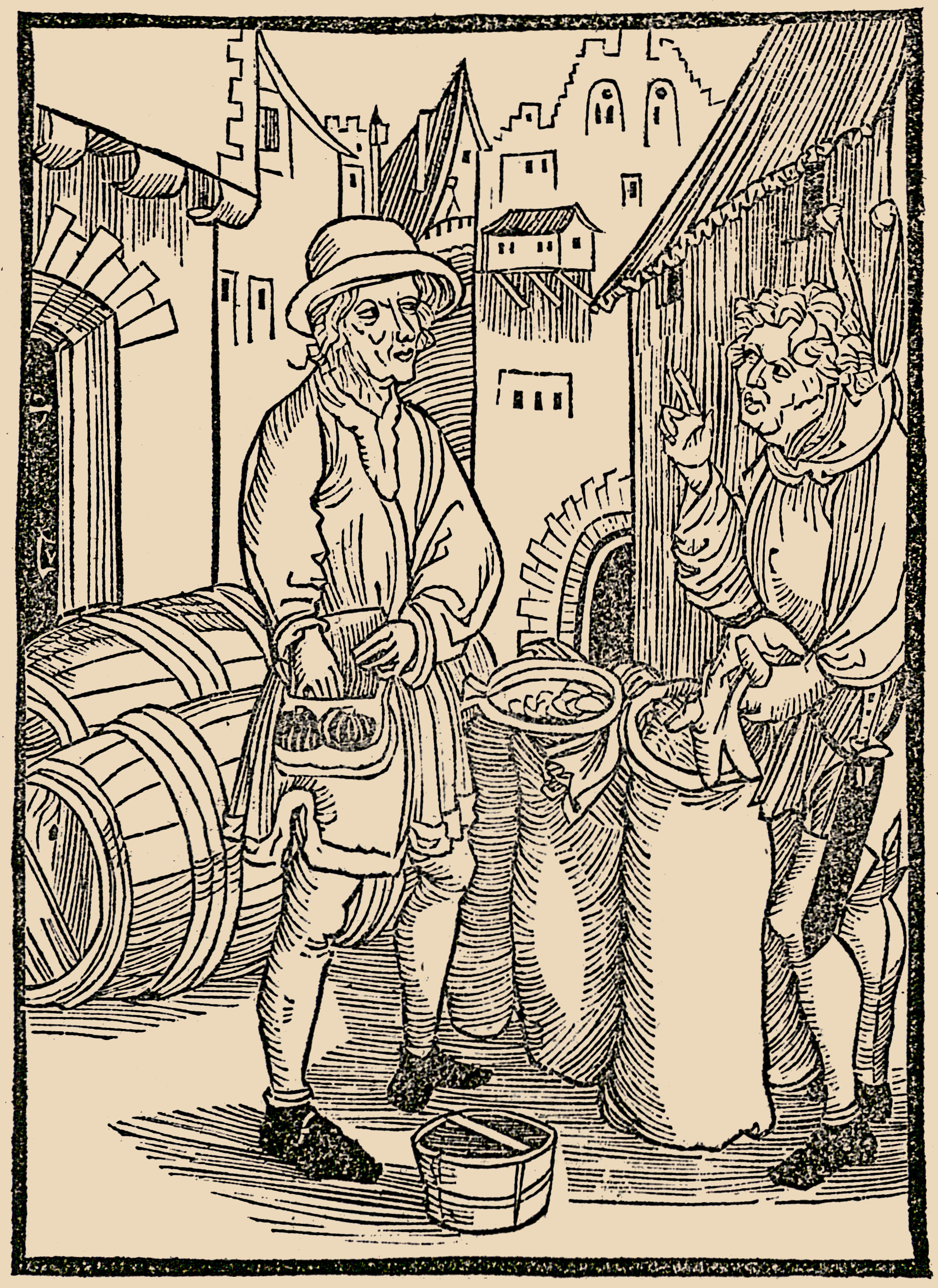
Of Usury, from Brant's Stultifera Navis (the Ship of Fools); woodcut attributed to Albrecht Dürer

The Old Testament "condemns the practice of charging interest because a loan should be an act of compassion and taking care of one's neighbor"; it teaches that "making a profit off a loan is exploiting that person and dishonoring God's covenant (Exodus 22:25–27)".

The Westminster Confession of Faith, a confession of faith upheld by the Reformed Churches, teaches that usury – charging interest at any rate – is a sin prohibited by the eighth commandment.

The Congregation of the Missionary Sons of the Immaculate Heart of Mary, a Catholic Christian religious order, teaches that the charging of interest is sinful:

It might initially seem like little is at stake when it comes to interest, but this is an issue of human dignity. A person is made in God's own image and therefore may never be treated as a thing. Interest can diminish the human person to a thing to be manipulated for money. In an article for The Catholic Worker, Dorothy Day articulated this well: "Can I talk about the people living off usury . . . not knowing the way that their infertile money has bred more money by wise investment in God knows what devilish nerve gas, drugs, napalm, missiles, or vanities, when housing and employment . . . for the poor were needed, and money could have been invested there?" Her thoughts were a precursor to what Pope Francis now calls an "economy that kills." To sin is to say "no" to God and God's presence by harming others, ourselves, or all of creation. Charging interest is indeed sinful when doing so takes advantage of a person in need as well as when it means investing in corporations involved in the harming of God's creatures.

== Social justice ==
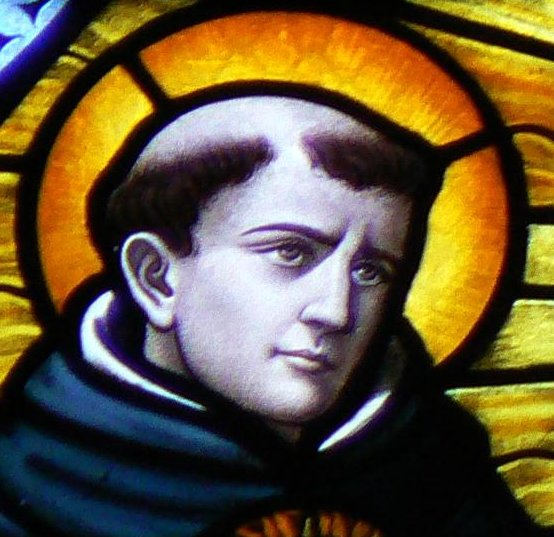
Much of Saint Thomas Aquinas's theology dealt with issues of social justice.

Social justice generally refers to the idea of creating a society or institution that is based on the principles of equality and solidarity, that understands and values human rights, and that recognizes the dignity of every human being. The term and modern concept of "social justice" was coined by the Jesuit Luigi Taparelli in 1840 based on the teachings of St. Thomas Aquinas and given further exposure in 1848 by Antonio Rosmini-Serbati. The idea was elaborated by the moral theologian John A. Ryan, who initiated the concept of a living wage. Father Coughlin also used the term in his publications in the 1930s and the 1940s. It is a part of Catholic social teaching, Social Gospel from Episcopalians and is one of the Four Pillars of the Green Party upheld by green parties worldwide. Social justice as a secular concept, distinct from religious teachings, emerged mainly in the late twentieth century, influenced primarily by philosopher John Rawls. Some tenets of social justice have been adopted by those on the left of the political spectrum.

According to Kent Van Til, the view that wealth has been taken from the poor by the rich implies that the redistribution of that wealth is more a matter of restitution than of theft.

=== Catholic social teaching ===
Come on, let us pray for those who have no work because it is world tragedy... in these times

— Pope Francis

Catholic social teaching is a body of doctrine developed by the Catholic Church on matters of poverty and wealth, economics, social organization and the role of the state. Its foundations are widely considered to have been laid by Pope Leo XIII's 1891 encyclical letter Rerum novarum, which advocated economic distributism and condemned socialism.

According to Pope Benedict XVI, its purpose "is simply to help purify reason and to contribute, here and now, to the acknowledgment and attainment of what is just.... [The Church] has to play her part through rational argument and she has to reawaken the spiritual energy without which justice...cannot prevail and prosper", According to Pope John Paul II, its foundation "rests on the threefold cornerstones of human dignity, solidarity and subsidiarity". These concerns echo elements of Jewish law and the prophetic books of the Old Testament, and recall the teachings of Jesus Christ recorded in the New Testament, such as his declaration that "whatever you have done for one of these least brothers of Mine, you have done for Me." (Matthew 25:40)

Catholic social teaching is distinctive in its consistent critiques of modern social and political ideologies both of the left and of the right: liberalism, communism, socialism, libertarianism, capitalism, Fascism, and Nazism have all been condemned, at least in their pure forms, by several popes since the late nineteenth century.

=== Marxism ===
Irving Kristol posits that one reason that those who are "experiencing a Christian impulse, an impulse toward the imitatio Christi, would lean toward socialism ... is the attitude of Christianity toward the poor. "

Arnold Toynbee characterized Communist ideology as a "Christian heresy" in the sense that it focused on a few elements of the faith to the exclusion of the others. Donald Treadgold interprets Toynbee's characterization as applying to Christian attitudes as opposed to Christian doctrines. In his book, "Moral Philosophy", Jacques Maritain echoed Toynbee's perspective, characterizing the teachings of Karl Marx as a "Christian heresy". After reading Maritain, Martin Luther King Jr. commented that Marxism had arisen in response to "a Christian world unfaithful to its own principles." Although King criticized the Soviet Marxist–Leninist Communist regime sharply, he nonetheless commented that Marx's devotion to a classless society made him almost Christian. Tragically, said King, Communist regimes created "new classes and a new lexicon of injustice."

=== Christian socialism ===
Christian socialism generally refers to those on the Christian left whose politics are both Christian and socialist and who see these two philosophies as being interrelated. This category can include Liberation theology and the doctrine of the social gospel.

The Rerum novarum encyclical of Leo XIII (1891) was the starting point of a Catholic doctrine on social questions that has been expanded and updated over the course of the 20th century. Despite the introduction of social thought as an object of religious thought, Rerum novarum explicitly rejects what it calls "the main tenet of socialism":

"Hence, it is clear that the main tenet of socialism, community of goods, must be utterly rejected, since it only injures those whom it would seem meant to benefit, is directly contrary to the natural rights of mankind, and would introduce confusion and disorder into the commonwealth. The first and most fundamental principle, therefore, if one would undertake to alleviate the condition of the masses, must be the inviolability of private property." Rerum novarum, paragraph 16.

The encyclical promotes a kind of corporatism based on social solidarity among the classes with respects for the needs and rights of all.

In the November 1914 issue of The Christian Socialist, Episcopal bishop Franklin Spencer Spalding of Utah, U.S., stated:

The Christian Church exists for the sole purpose of saving the human race. So far she has failed, but I think that Socialism shows her how she may succeed. It insists that men cannot be made right until the material conditions be made right. Although man cannot live by bread alone, he must have bread. Therefore, the Church must destroy a system of society which inevitably creates and perpetuates unequal and unfair conditions of life. These unequal and unfair conditions have been created by competition. Therefore, competition must cease and cooperation take its place.

Despite the explicit rejection of Socialism, in the more Catholic countries of Europe the encyclical's teaching was the inspiration that led to the formation of new Christian-inspired Socialist parties. A number of Christian socialist movements and political parties throughout the world group themselves into the International League of Religious Socialists. It has member organizations in 21 countries representing 200,000 members.

Christian socialists draw parallels between what some have characterized as the egalitarian and anti-establishment message of Jesus, who–according to the Gospel–spoke against the religious authorities of his time, and the egalitarian, anti-establishment, and sometimes anti-clerical message of most contemporary socialisms. Some Christian Socialists have become active Communists. This phenomenon was most common among missionaries in China, the most notable being James Gareth Endicott, who became supportive of the struggle of the Chinese Communist Party in the 1930s and 1940s.

Michael Moore's film Capitalism: A Love Story also features a religious component where Moore examines whether or not capitalism is a sin and whether Jesus would be a capitalist, in order to shine light on the ideological contradictions among evangelical conservatives who support free market ideals.

=== Liberation theology ===
Liberation theology is a Christian movement in political theology which interprets the teachings of Jesus Christ in terms of a liberation from unjust economic, political, or social conditions. It has been described by proponents as "an interpretation of Christian faith through the poor's suffering, their struggle and hope, and a critique of society and the Catholic faith and Christianity through the eyes of the poor", and by detractors as Christianized Marxism. Although liberation theology has grown into an international and inter-denominational movement, it began as a movement within the Roman Catholic Church in Latin America in the 1950s–1960s. Liberation theology arose principally as a moral reaction to the poverty caused by social injustice in that region. The term was coined in 1971 by the Peruvian priest Gustavo Gutiérrez, who wrote one of the movement's most famous books, A Theology of Liberation. Other noted exponents are Leonardo Boff of Brazil, Jon Sobrino of El Salvador, and Juan Luis Segundo of Uruguay. Saint Óscar Romero, former Archbishop of San Salvador, was a prominent exponent of liberation theology, and was assassinated in 1980, during the Salvadoran Civil War; he was canonized as a saint by Pope Francis in 2018.

The influence of liberation theology within the Catholic Church diminished after proponents using Marxist concepts were admonished by the Vatican's Congregation for the Doctrine of the Faith (CDF) in 1984 and 1986. The Vatican criticized certain strains of liberation theology – without actually identifying any particular strain – for focusing on institutional dimensions of sin to the exclusion of the individual; and for allegedly misidentifying the Church hierarchy as members of the privileged class.

== See also ==
- Jesus and the rich young man
- Parable of the Rich Fool
- Simple living
- United Order
