= Dave Miller =

Dave Miller may refer to:

- Dave Miller (baseball) (born 1966), American baseball player and coach
- Dave Miller (footballer, born 1921) (1921–1989), English footballer
- Dave Miller (footballer, born 1964), English footballer
- Dave Miller (New Zealand musician), New Zealand-born musician, leader of Australian band, Dave Miller Set
- Dave Miller (producer) (1925–1985), American popular-music record producer
- Dave Miller (broadcaster), American broadcaster
- Dave Miller (singer-songwriter) (born 1952), American singer-songwriter
- Dave Miller (cyclist) (born 1960), English track and road cyclist
- Dave Miller (fl. 2000s), American musician, co-founder of rock band Senses Fail
- Dave Miller, a fictional character in the TV series Waterloo Road

== See also ==
- David Miller (disambiguation)
