= Enrique R. Arzac =

Economist and professor

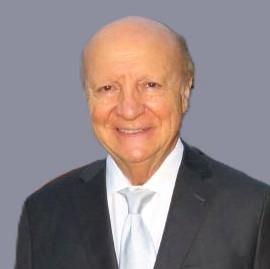

Academic background
- Education: Columbia University, University of Buenos Aires
- Academic advisors: William Vickrey, David W. Miller

Academic work
- Discipline: Financial economics
- Institutions: Columbia University
- Website: www0.gsb.columbia.edu/faculty/earzac/

Enrique R. Arzac is a financial economist and Professor Emeritus of finance and economics at Columbia University specialized in asset pricing and corporate finance. Previously he was tenured professor of Finance and Economics and served as the Senior Vice-Dean and Chairman of the Finance Division of the Columbia University Graduate School of Business. Before joining Columbia Arzac taught at the University of Buenos Aires, and was Chief Economist of the Latin American Economic Research Foundation.

== Education ==
Enrique R. Arzac obtained a CPN degree from the University of Buenos Aires, and MBA, MA in economics and Ph.D. in financial economics from Columbia University. His research spans several areas of economics including asset pricing, commodity markets and corporate finance.

== Career ==
Arzac's contributions include the development of loss aversion asset pricing when investors follow a generalization of Roy's safety-first criterion. Asset pricing under loss aversion provides the theoretical foundation for Value at risk portfolio management and the framework for empirical research of the extreme returns observed in emerging markets and after black swan events (see, Black swan theory and Heavy-tailed distribution).

Since 1982 he has been director of investment companies, including Adams Diversified Equity Fund, Adams Natural Resources Fund, Abrdn Asset Management and chairman of its emerging market funds, Abrdn EFF securities, Abrdn Asia Pacific Income Investment Co., Credit Suisse Asset Management and chairman of its high yield income funds, Mirae Asset Securities (USA) Inc., Epoch Holding Corporation and NEXT Investors LLC.

== Books ==
Arzac is the author of "Valuation for Mergers, Buyouts and Restructuring", 2nd ed., John Wiley and Sons, 2008. (Translated into Japanese, Chuo Keizai Sha, Inc., Tokyo, 2009 and Chinese, Dang-Dang/Wiley, Beijing, 2012.)
