= The Parable of the Rich Fool (Rembrandt) =

Painting by Rembrandt

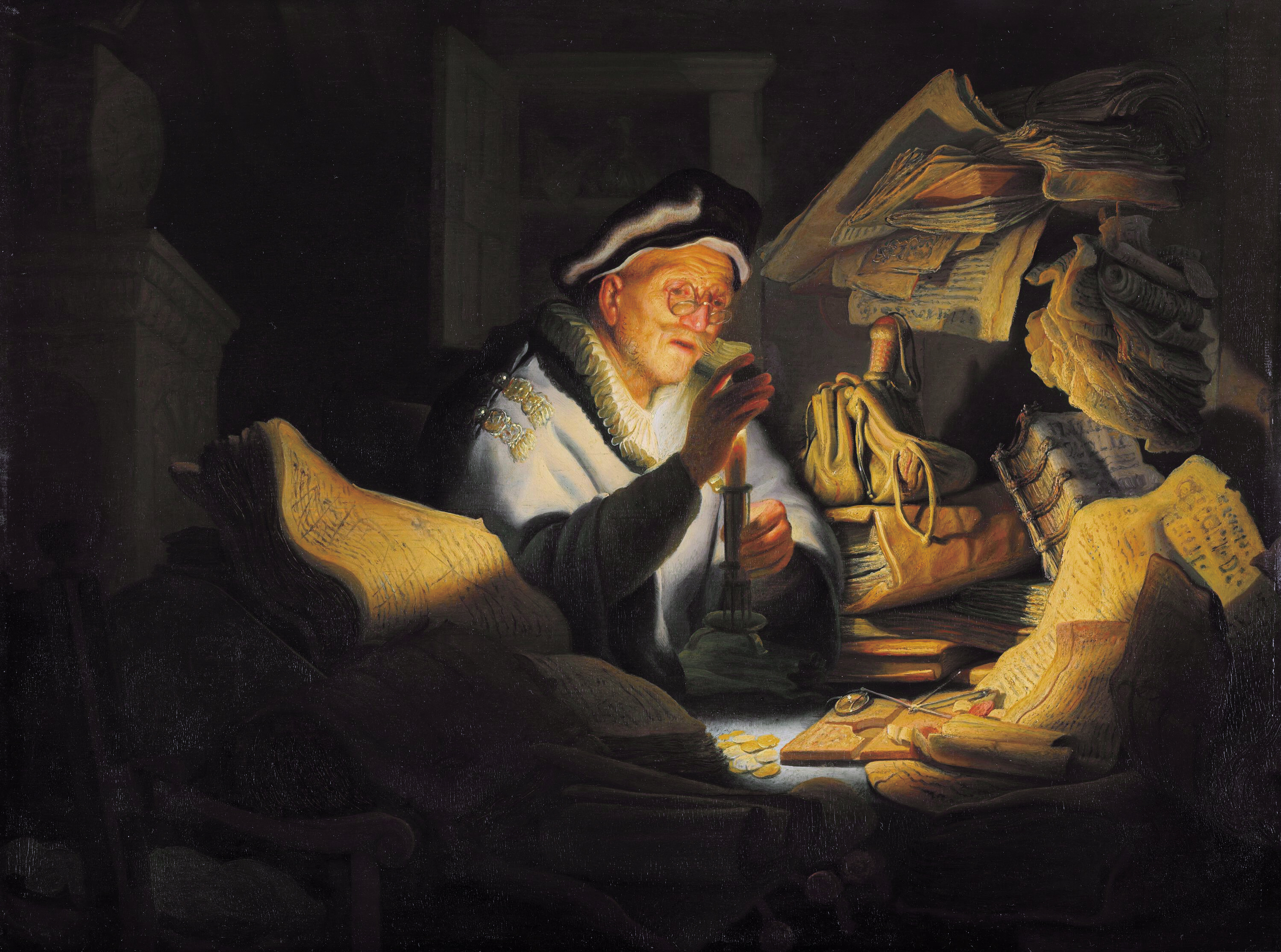
The Parable of the Rich Fool (1627) by Rembrandt

The Parable of the Rich Fool, also known as The Money Changer, is an oil painting on canvas of 1627 by Rembrandt, now in the Gemäldegalerie, Berlin. Produced early in the artist's career, it depicts the eponymous Biblical parable. The model for the figure is said to have been Rembrandt's father.

== Related works ==
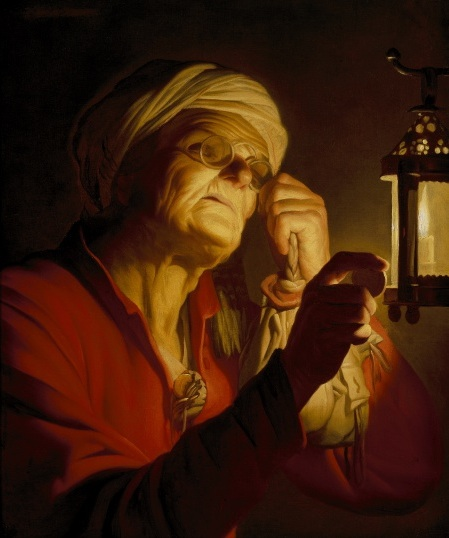
Gerrit van Honthorst's Old Woman Studying a Coin, 1623–1624, a possible inspiration for the work

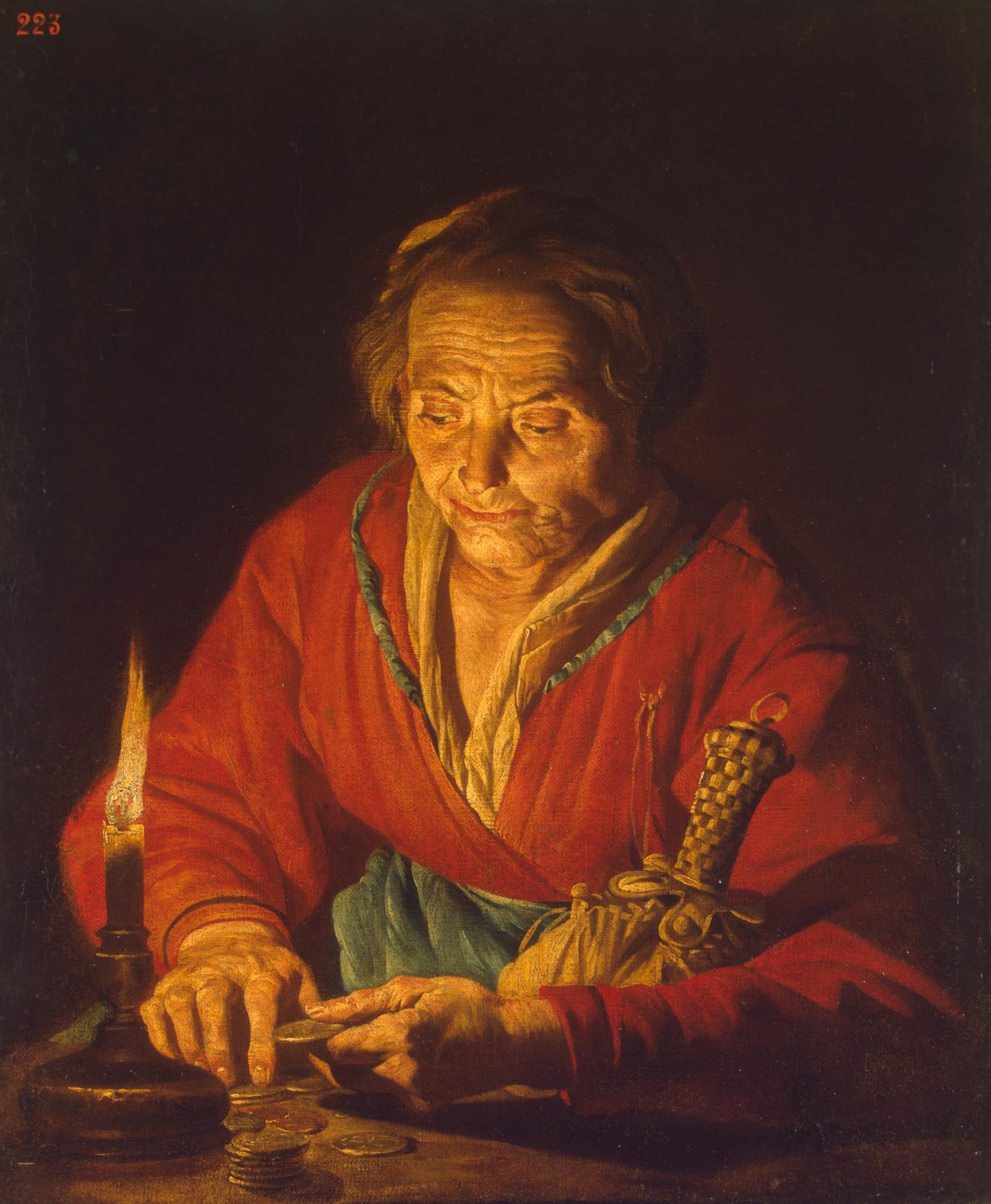
Matthias Stom's Old Woman by Candlelight, 1630–1640, with many similar elements

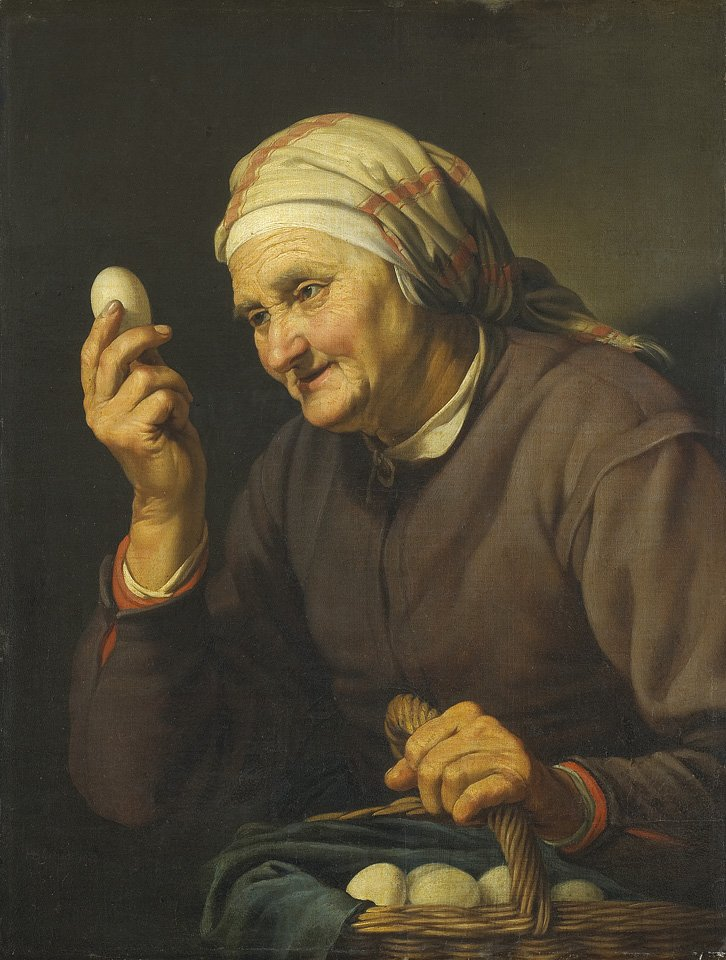
Hendrick Bloemaert's, Woman Selling Eggs, 1632, a comparable composition

== See also ==
- List of paintings by Rembrandt
