= David Millar (disambiguation) =

David Millar (born 1977) is a British cyclist.

David Millar may also refer to:

- David Millar (politician) (born 1955), former Canadian politician
- David Millar (RCAF officer), Royal Canadian Air Force officer
- David Millar (civil servant), Scottish civil servant
- David Millar (sailor) in 1964 Star World Championships

== See also ==
- David Miller (disambiguation)
