= David V. Miller =

United States Air Force general

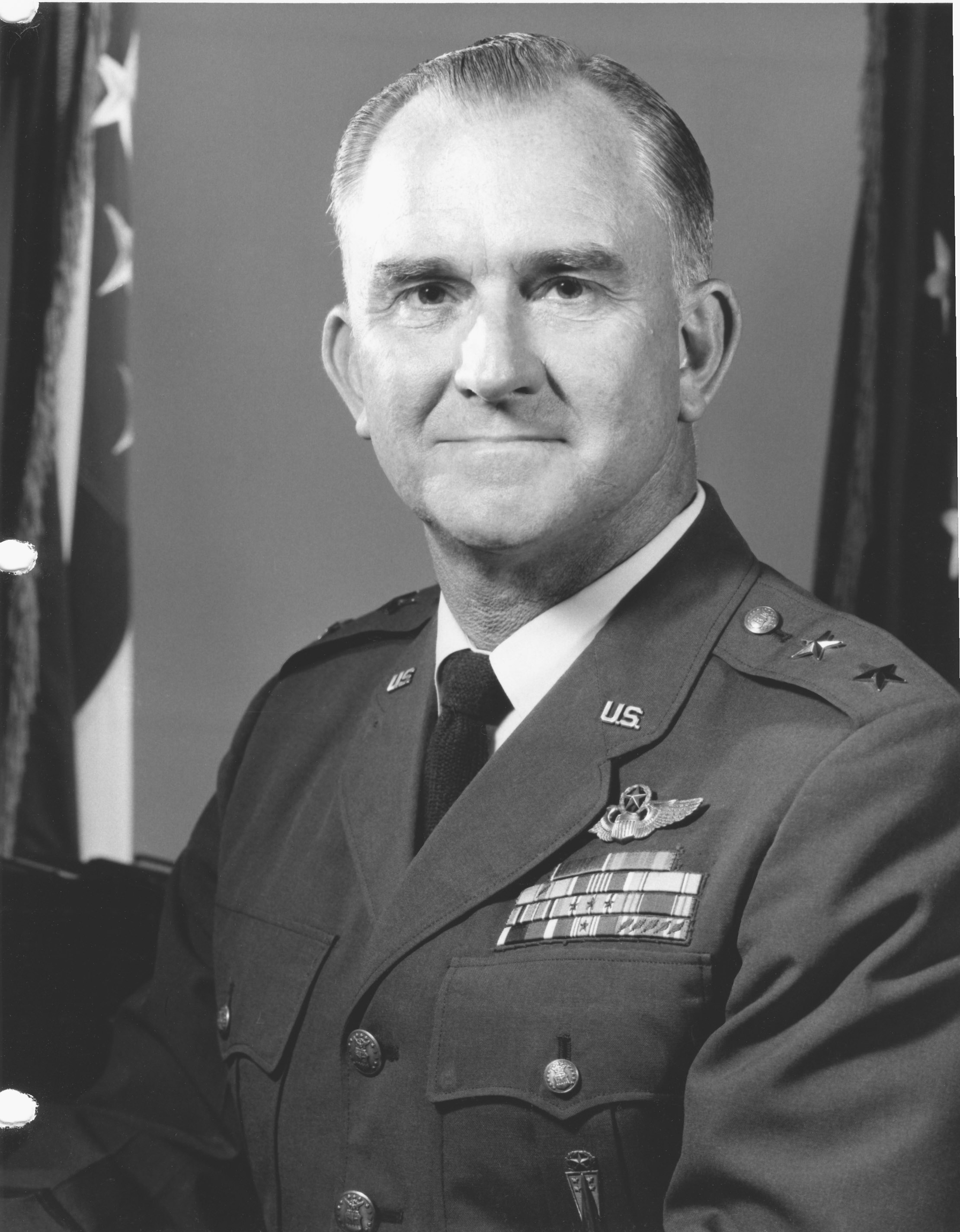
Maj Gen David V. Miller

David V. Miller (April 23, 1919 – January 2016) was a major general in the United States Air Force.

== Biography ==
Miller was born in Glen Ellyn, Illinois, in 1919. He would graduate from Glenbard High School. Later, he attended the Lewis Institute before graduating from the University of Wisconsin, and attending Harvard Business School's Advanced Management Program.

== Career ==
Miller began aviation training in 1940 and he was commissioned in the United States Army Air Corps the following year. During World War II, he was an instructor with the United States Army Air Forces at Randolph Field and Kelly Field before serving with the 6th Reconnaissance Group as a Lockheed P-38 Lightning pilot. Afterwards, Miller transferred to the newly created Air Force and joined Air Training Command.

From 1952 to 1953, Miller was assigned to the United States Naval Research Laboratory as a nuclear research officer, afterwards going to the Los Alamos Scientific Laboratory. After attending the Air War College, he became Director and Operations and Deputy Commander of the 47th Bombardment Wing.

Miller was assigned to the Air Force Headquarters from 1958 to 1963, at the same time working the United States Atomic Energy Commission. In 1963, Miller joined the Air Force Systems Command and later oversaw the Titan IIIC development program. In 1967, he took command of the Air Force Special Weapons Center and held it until 1969, at which time he returned to the Air Force Systems Command. He later returned to the Air Force Headquarters in 1970 and would retired the following year.

Awards he received during his career include the Legion of Merit with oak leaf cluster, the Air Medal, the Air Force Commendation Medal, the Army Commendation Medal and the Master Missileman Badge.
