= Joseph Conforti =

American historian of New England

Joseph Anthony Conforti
- Born: February 1, 1945 (age 81)
- Education: Springfield College (B.S., 1967), Brown University (A.M., 1972; Ph.D., 1975)
- Occupations: Historian, educator, academic, author
- Known for: His work on American and New England Studies
- Awards: National Endowment for the Arts grant (1989); National Endowment for the Humanities grants (1988, 1989, 1993, 1994); Davis Foundation grant (1990); Richard Beale Davis Prize (1991); Annual Best Book Award, Northeast Popular Culture-American Culture Association (2002); Choice Outstanding Academic Book, (2007)
- Title: Distinguished Professor Emeritus

Academic background
- Thesis: SAMUEL HOPKINS AND THE NEW DIVINITY (1971)
- Doctoral advisor: William G. McLoughlin, Jr.
- Other advisor: Gordon S. Wood

Academic work
- Discipline: American Studies
- Sub-discipline: American History, New England Studies
- Institutions: Rhode Island College, University of Southern Maine
- Notable works: Jonathan Edwards, Religious Tradition, and American Culture (1995); Imagining New England: Explorations Of Regional Identity From The Pilgrims To The Mid-twentieth Century (2001); Saints and Strangers: New England in British North America (2006)

Joseph Anthony Conforti (born February 1, 1945) is an American historian, educator, editor, author, and academic. He is known for his contributions to American studies and to the cultural and religious history of New England. Conforti began his academic career at Rhode Island College, where he spent ten years before joining the University of Southern Maine. There he served as the Director of the American and New England Studies graduate program and later became Distinguished Professor of American and New England Studies. He has published eight books and has edited and contributed to a ninth. His notable works include "Imagining New England: explorations of regional identity from the pilgrims to the mid-twentieth century," (2001) which explores the region's identity, and "Hidden Places: Maine Writers on Coastal Villages, Mill Towns, and the North Country," (2020) which analyzes Maine's literary landscape.

== Early life and education ==
Conforti was born on February 1, 1945. He earned his Bachelor of Science degree in History and English from Springfield College in 1967. He then pursued graduate studies at Brown University, where he received his A.M. in American History in 1972 and his Ph.D. in American Civilization in 1975.

== Career ==
Conforti began his academic career as an instructor of history at Rhode Island College in 1976. He became an assistant professor in 1978 and was later promoted to associate professor of English and history in 1982, a position he held until 1987. In that year, he joined the University of Southern Maine as a professor of American and New England Studies. He served as the founding director of the American and New England Studies program at the university from 1987 to 1997 and continued as a Professor until his retirement, when he was named Distinguished Professor Emeritus in 2011.

Outside academia, Conforti has been deeply involved in various organizations. He served as the vice president of the New England Historical Association (NEHA) from 2000 to 2001 and then as its president from 2001 to 2002. He has also been a member NEHA's executive committee and on the editorial board of the Maine Historical Society Quarterly.

He was a member of the advisory board for the New England Studies Series of the University Press of New England from 1997 to 2000 and served on the editorial board of Religion and American Culture from 1998 to 2005. As an external evaluator, he has contributed his expertise for various academic programs, including those at Pine Manor College and Plymouth State University.

Conforti has served as a project scholar and consultant for the Maine Humanities Council since 1987. He has been affiliated with various historical preservation organizations, including Greater Portland Landmarks and the Maine Historical Society. He also served as a volunteer tutor at Portland Adult Education helping immigrants prepare for the citizenship test.

=== New England's regional identity ===
His 2001 book Imagining New England: Explorations of Regional Identity from the Pilgrims to the Mid-Twentieth Century provides a comprehensive overview of the region's identity over three centuries, examining cultural expressions from literature to gravestones. Conforti argues that New England's identity has been shaped by narratives of the past, which have been continually revised in response to the transformations of regional life. He also highlights the Americanization and re-Anglicization of New England's identity and the role of Federalist leaders in promoting the region as a model for the new nation. Conforti calls for a broader understanding of New England's history that includes its ethnic diversity, reflecting his own upbringing in the diverse, working-class city of Fall River.

=== Maine literary and cultural history ===
Conforti is a scholar with a specialization in regional cultural history, religion, and literature. His work in "Hidden Places: Maine Writers on Coastal Villages, Mill Towns, and the North Country" (Down East Books, 2020), written for a general audience, examines the relationship of Maine's geography and history to its literary traditions. In "Hidden Places, his last book, Conforti provides analysis and contextualization of the works of eleven Maine novelists, ranging from Sarah Orne Jewett to contemporary authors like Richard Russo and Monica Wood. His work reflects an understanding of the novels' critical reception over time and engages with the diverse terrains, topographies, and social dynamics of Maine. Conforti deliberately excludes urban Maine, particularly Portland, from his analysis, positing that it has not yet produced a master novelist. His commentary on authors such as Monica Wood explores the intersection of personal background and literary output within the context of Maine's working-class culture.

=== Editorial and advisory roles ===
Conforti has served on the editorial boards of several historical reviews, including the Maine Historical Society Quarterly and, Religion and American Culture. He was also a member of the advisory board for the University Press of New England's "New England Studies" series from 1997 to 2000.

=== Awards, honors, and grants ===
- University of Southern Maine Faculty Achievement Award (1988)
- National Endowment for the Arts grant for a project on traditional New England town design (1989)
- National Endowment for the Humanities grants for various projects, including "Creating New England: Memory, Nostalgia, and Tradition" (1993-1994) and "Region and the Imagination: New England and the South" (1994-1996)
- Davis Foundation Grant for New England Studies Program Development (1990)
- Richard Beale Davis Prize for the Best Essay Published in Early American Literature (1991)
- Annual Best Book Award, Northeast Popular Culture-American Culture Association for Imagining New England (2002)
- Certificate of Merit, Association for the Study of State and Local History for Creating Portland: History and Place in Northern New England (2006)
- Choice Outstanding Academic Book for Saints and Strangers: New England in British North America (2007)
- Constance Carlson Public Humanities Prize, Maine Humanities Council (2010)
- Neal W. Allen Jr. History Award, Maine Historical Society (2012)

== Selected publications ==
=== Books ===
- Conforti, J. A. (1981). Samuel Hopkins and the New Divinity Movement: Calvinism, the Congregational ministry, and reform in New England between the Great Awakenings. Christian University Press.
- Conforti, J. A. (1995). Jonathan Edwards, Religious Tradition, and American Culture. University of North Carolina Press.
- Conforti, J. A. (2001). Imagining New England: explorations of regional identity from the pilgrims to the mid-twentieth century. University of North Carolina Press.
- Conforti, J. A. (Ed.). (2007). Creating Portland: History and Place in Northern New England. UPNE.
- Conforti, J. A. (2006). Saints and Strangers: New England in British North America. Johns Hopkins University Press.
- Another City upon a Hill: A New England Memoir (2013) UMass Dartmouth
- Conforti, J. A. (2016). Lizzie Borden on Trial: Murder, Ethnicity, and Gender. University Press of Kansas.

=== Encyclopedias ===
- Conforti, J. A. (2012). New England. In Oxford Encyclopedia of American Social History. Oxford University Press.
- Conforti, J. A. (2011). New England landscapes and regional identity. In A Landscape History of New England (pp. 17-34). MIT Press.
- Conforti, J. A. (2010). Connecticut: A historic identity-free zone. In Connecticut History (special commemorative issue).
- Conforti, J. A. (2007). The Salem witchcraft hysteria. In The Encyclopedia of American Disasters and Catastrophes. Facts on File.
- Conforti, J. A. (2005). Celebrations of New England’s past. In Encyclopedia of New England Culture (pp. 745-746). Yale University Press..
- Conforti, J. A. (2001). New England theology from Edwards to Bushnell. In Encyclopedia of American Cultural and Intellectual History (pp. 208-214). Scribner’s.

=== Journal articles ===
- Conforti, J. A. (1996). Edwards A. Park and the creation of the New England theology, 1840-1870. Jonathan Edwards's Writings: Text, Context and Interpretation, 193-207.
- Conforti, J. A. (1995). The New England religious heritage: Some aspects of tradition. Horizons (Bangor Theological Seminary), 27-47.
- Conforti, J. A. (1993). Jonathan Edwards and American culture. Bulletin of the General Theological Library of Bangor Seminary, 3-12.
- Conforti, J. A. (1993). Mary Lyon, the founding of Mount Holyoke College and the cultural revival of Jonathan Edwards. Religion and American Culture, 205-225.
- Conforti, J. A. (1991). The invention of the Great Awakening, 1795-1842. Early American Literature, 99-119.
- Conforti, J. A. (1989). Jonathan Edwards and American studies. American Quarterly, 165-171.
- Conforti, J. A. (1988). Ice and granite: The New England character. Maine Historical Society Quarterly, 92-108.
- Conforti, J. A. (1987). Antebellum evangelicals and the cultural revival of Jonathan Edwards. Journal of Presbyterian History, 227-241.
- Conforti, J. A. (1986). Irving Fain and the fair housing movement in Rhode Island, 1958-1970. Rhode Island History, 21-35.
- Conforti, J. A. (1985). David Brainerd and the nineteenth-century missionary movement. Journal of the Early Republic, 309–329.
- Conforti, J. A. (1985). Jonathan Edwards's most popular work: 'The Life of David Brainerd' and nineteenth-century evangelical culture. Church History, 188–201.
- Conforti, J. A. (1983). Joseph Bellamy and the New Divinity movement. New England Historical and Genealogical Register, 126–138.
- Conforti, J. A. (1980). The rise of the New Divinity in Western New England, 1740–1800. Historical Journal of Massachusetts, 37–47.
- Conforti, J. A. (1979). Samuel Hopkins and the revolutionary antislavery movement. Rhode Island History, 38–49.
- Conforti, J. A. (1977). Samuel Hopkins and the New Divinity: Theology, ethics, and social reform in mid-eighteenth-century New England. William and Mary Quarterly, 572–589.
- Conforti, J. A. (1987). Samuel Hopkins and the New Divinity. In P. C. Hoffer (Ed.), Collected Essays on Early America. Garland.
- Conforti, J. A. (1980). Samuel Hopkins and the New Divinity. In W. J. Scheick (Ed.), Jonathan Edwards: Critical Essays (pp. 37–47). G. K. Hall.
