= Cosimo Perrotta =

Italian professor of economic history

Cosimo Perrotta (born 9 July 1942) is an Italian professor of economic history at the University of Salento and author of the book Consumption as an Investment. Perrotta was born in Squinzano, Italy.

== Publications ==
- Coats, Alfred W.; Perrotta, Cosimo; Gioia, Vitantonio; Centro di Studi Economici; Università degli studi di Lecce, eds. (1994). Where is economics going? Historical viewpoints; [papers ..., delivered at the University of Lecce during 1992/93 in a series of seminars organized by the Centro di Studi Economici]. Itinerari di ricerca storica Supplementi. Galatina (Lecce): Congedo. ISBN 978-88-8086-079-2.
- Perrotta, Cosimo (2004). Consumption as an investment. Routledge studies in the history of economics. London; New York: Routledge. ISBN 978-0-415-30619-5. OCLC 55085749.
- Perrotta, Cosimo (2020). Is capitalism still progressive? A historical approach. Palgrave pivot. Cham, Switzerland: Palgrave Macmillan. ISBN 978-3-030-48169-8.
- Perrotta, Cosimo (2018). Unproductive labour in political economy: the history of an idea. Routledge studies in the history of economics. London; New York: Routledge, Taylor & Francis Group. ISBN 978-1-138-65832-5.
