= David Lee Miller (academic) =

American literary scholar

David Lee Miller (born 1951) is an American scholar of English Renaissance literature and a Carolina Distinguished Professor Emeritus at the University of South Carolina. He is known for his research on the works of Edmund Spenser, particularly the poetics of The Faerie Queene, and the motif of filial sacrifice in Western literature.

== Education and career ==
Miller was educated at Yale University, where he earned a B.A. in 1973, and the University of California, Irvine, where he completed his PhD in 1982.

He taught at the University of Alabama from 1978 until 1994 and at the University of Kentucky from 1994 until 2004, before joining the faculty at the University of South Carolina. He has received fellowships from the John Simon Guggenheim Memorial Foundation (1989), the National Endowment for the Humanities, and the Andrew W. Mellon Foundation.

== Scholarship ==
Miller's first book, The Poem's Two Bodies: The Poetics of the 1590 "Faerie Queene" (1988), analyzes the relationship between Spenser's aesthetic structure and the political ideology of the Tudor period. His 2003 work, Dreams of the Burning Child, examines the theme of filial sacrifice across works by Virgil, Shakespeare, and Charles Dickens.

He is a General Editor of The Collected Works of Edmund Spenser, published by Oxford University Press, and served as the editor of The Spenser Review from 2012 to 2017.

== Selected works ==
- The Poem's Two Bodies: The Poetics of the 1590 "Faerie Queene" (Princeton University Press, 1988)
- Dreams of the Burning Child: Sacrificial Sons and the Father's Witness (Cornell University Press, 2003)
- The Production of English Renaissance Culture (Cornell University Press, 1994) – co-edited with Sharon O'Dair and Harold Weber
- Approaches to Teaching Spenser's Faerie Queene (Modern Language Association, 1994) – co-edited with Alexander Dunlop
