= David Miller (minister) =

David Miller is a Scottish minister who served as Moderator of the General Assembly of the Free Church of Scotland in 2014.

== Life ==
He was born in Korea to Scottish parents and spent most of his youth in Tasmania, studying Economics at the University of Tasmania, graduating in 1981.

In 1982, he moved to Edinburgh in Scotland where he befriended his minister, Rev Donald Lamont of St Columba's Free Church, also working in the Church of Scotland bookshop on George Street. Re-inspired, he began studying Divinity in 1985 at the Free Church College in Edinburgh, graduating in 1988. He was then dispatched by the Foreign Missions Board to work in South Africa. Here he served in various village schools in the southern Transkei before settling in Dumisani to run their Bible School. From this base he also lectured in various church subjects at Potchefstroom University. Here he also obtained a further degree in Theology.

In 2002, he returned to Britain, taking up the first ever post as Free Church minister of Cobham near London in 2003.

In 2014, he succeeded Rev Angus Howat as Moderator of the General Assembly.

In 2015, he moved to Duirinish Free Church on Skye.

== Family ==
He was married to Margaret (Meg) Campbell of Stornoway in 1989. They were married by her brother Rev Iain D. Campbell.

They had three sons (born in South Africa): Andrew, Ben, and John.
