= Dave Miller (footballer, born 1921) =

English footballer

Personal information
- Date of birth: 21 January 1921
- Place of birth: Middlesbrough, England
- Date of death: 1989 (aged 67–68)
- Position: Wing half

Youth career
- 1935−1936: South Bank Casuals

Senior career*
Years	Team	Apps	(Gls)
1938−1945	Middlesbrough	0	(0)
1946−1947	Wolverhampton Wanderers	3	(0)
1947−1948	Derby County	1	(0)
1948−1953	Doncaster Rovers	146	(4)
1953−1954	Aldershot	11	(0)
1954−1959	Boston United	163	(12)
- * Club domestic league appearances and goals

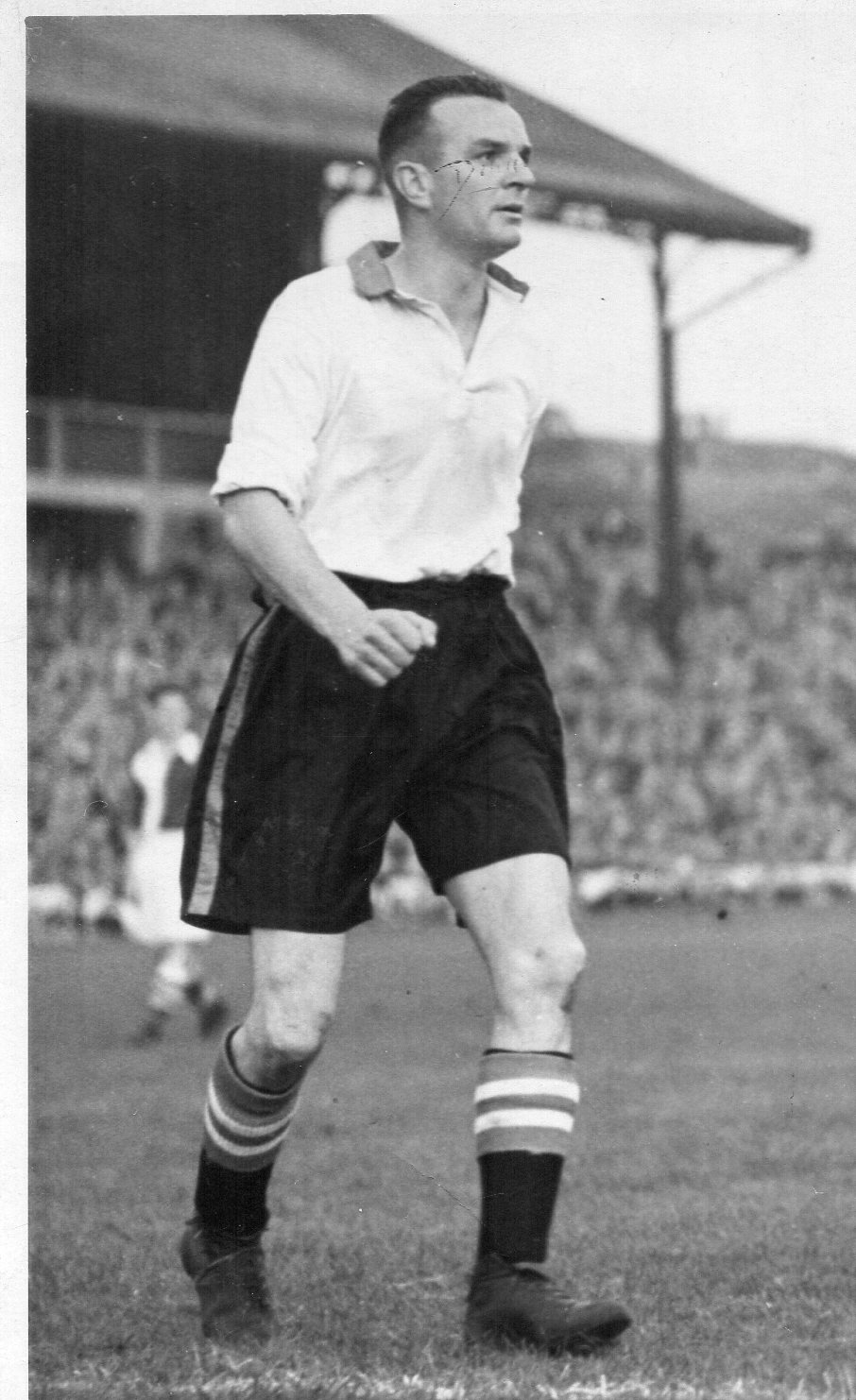
Miller in action for Doncaster Rovers

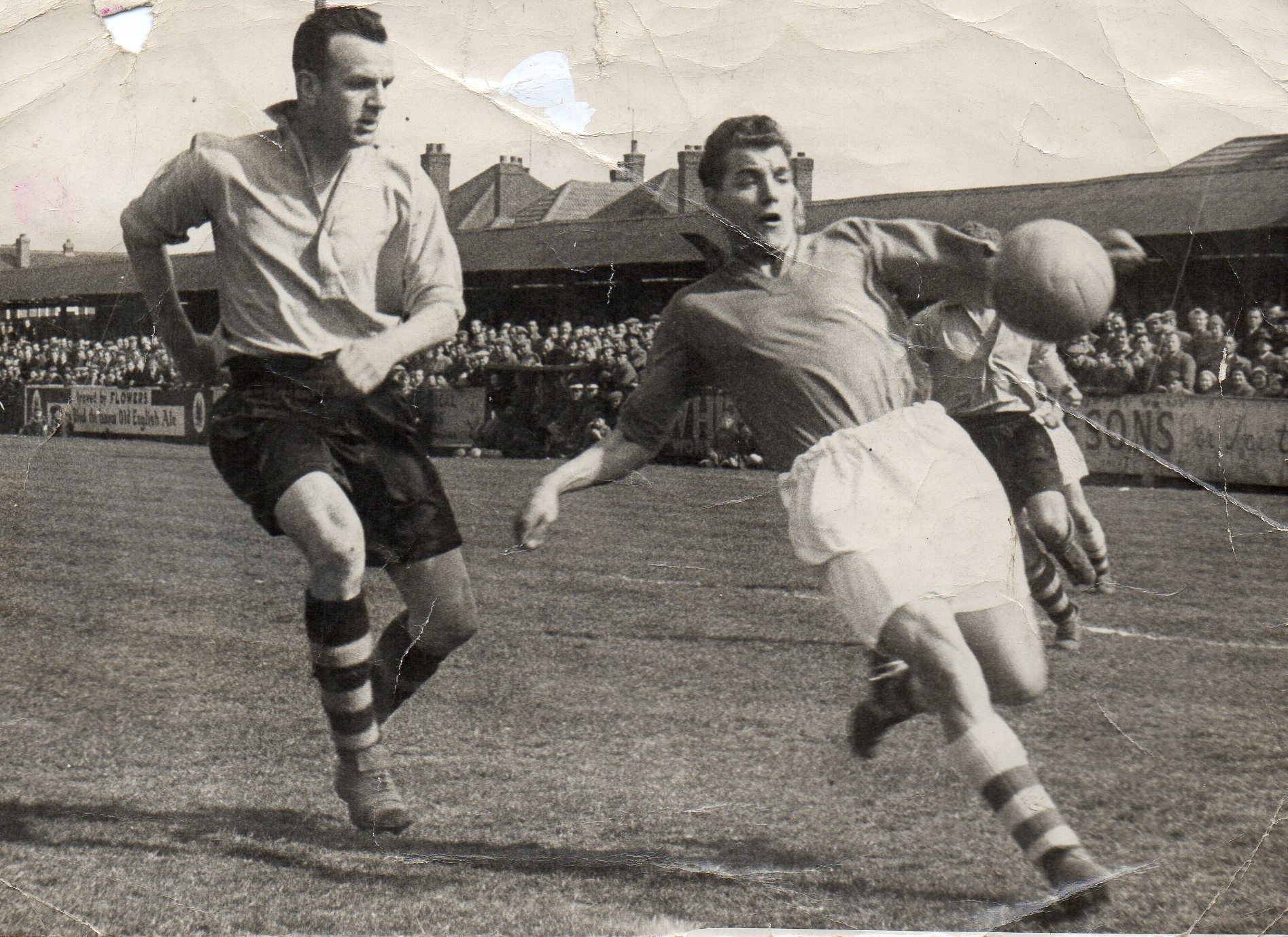
At Boston United c 1955

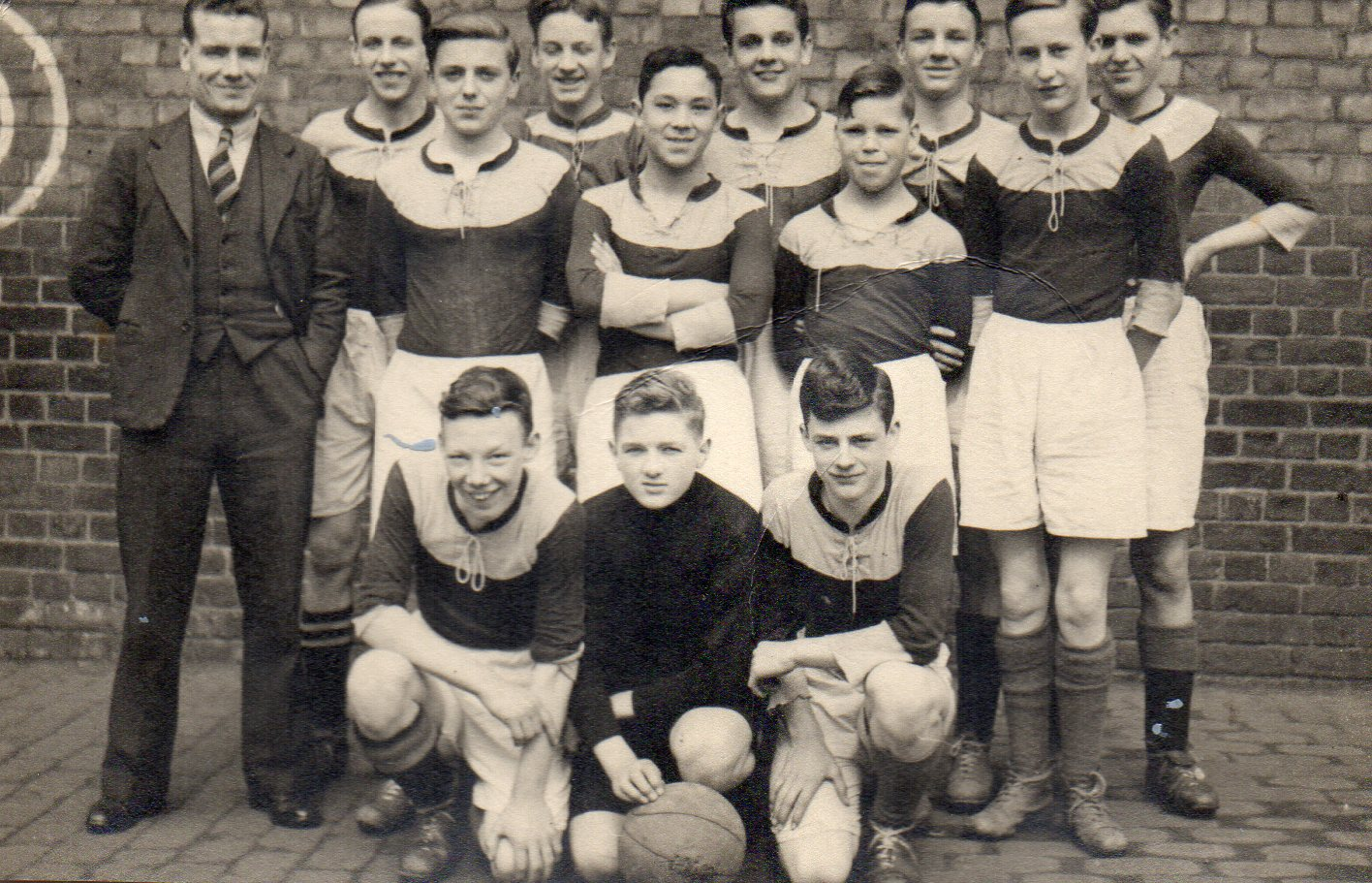
South Bank Casuals c 1936.jpg

David "Dave" "Dusty" Miller (21 January 1921−1989) was an English footballer who played as a wing half in the Football League mainly for Doncaster Rovers.

Born in Middlesbrough, Miller played for local youth team South Bank Casuals, scoring 42 goals as centre forward in the 1934−35 season. He signed for Middlesbrough a couple of seasons later but failed to make a first team league appearance. His career was interrupted by the Second World War. Miller was drafted into the RAF in 1940 as a PTI (Physical Training Instructor) and spent two years training servicemen in Canada. On returning to England he was stationed at various RAF bases and guested for local league teams when league football resumed. A subsequent move to Wolverhampton Wanderers gained him three League games before a serious leg muscle injury sidelined him for a season. A move to Derby County brought him a single appearance in half a season.

Doncaster were having a surprisingly bad season and were wanting to make improvements, so they brought Miller to Belle Vue in January 1948. In his 5 1/2 seasons there he helped them win the Division 3 North title and sustain their place in Division 2. He made 146 appearances, scored 4 goals, and had a spell as captain. He left to Aldershot in March 1953.

At the end of the season with the 'Shots, he transferred to Boston United. Whilst there he was a regular feature, clocking up 192 games and 15 goals. He was in the side that won in the FA Cup second round at Derby County 6−1 in 1955, and was considered man of the match in the game at Tottenham Hotspur in the next round.

Miller died in 1989, aged 68.
