= Dave Miller (singer-songwriter) =

American musician, record producer, singer, & songwriter (born 1952)

- Born: October 12, 1952 (age 73); Little Rock, Arkansas, U.S.
- Genres: Americana, bluegrass, blues, country, folk rock, rockabilly, roots
- Occupations: Musician, multi-instrumentalist, record producer, singer, songwriter
- Instruments: Acoustic guitar, tenor and five-string banjo, guitar necked banjo (guitjo), bass guitar, electric guitar, resonator guitar, percussion, voice, whistle
- Years active: 1964–present
- Website: https://davemillercountry.com/

David Fletcher Miller (born October 12, 1952) is an American musician, multi-instrumentalist, record producer, singer, and songwriter. Since 1989, Dave Miller has resided in Memphis, Tennessee.

== Musical Career ==
David Fletcher Miller has been playing music, performing, and writing songs since 1964. He has played in taverns, dance halls, concert venues, festivals, showcases, and coffee houses from coast to coast across the United States and in British Columbia.

Notably, Dave and some of his friends formed a bluegrass trio that played around his hometown of Little Rock, Arkansas, and subsequently moved to Santa Fe, New Mexico, in 1976. The influences of the swing and two-stepping dance crowds and the great bands of the area that packed the dance floors, left a lasting impression on him. By 1977, keeping their homespun bluegrass and hillbilly roots, but adding swing, country rock, and western flavored ballads to their sound, they had named the band Gumbo because of the spicy mixture of so many types of music and instrumental combinations that the band had come to offer.

Throughout their tenure (1977–1982), Gumbo was a renown circuit band in Arkansas, Colorado, New Mexico, and Texas, but played venues from Myrtle Beach, South Carolina, to Fort Nelson, British Columbia, and all points in between, drawing crowds wherever they performed—even as the opening act for such performers as Brenda Lee, Jerry Jeff Walker, and Michael Martin Murphey.

In late 1978, the members of Gumbo moved to Alamosa, Colorado, and became part of the Americana music scene in Colorado and Northern New Mexico. It was there that Dave Miller met Don Richmond, a fellow picker, writer, and performer who is now the Owner and Producer for Howlin' Dog Records, where Dave has recorded much of his original music.

In 2013, after taking a long break from the road, enjoying family life, and having a successful career designing and developing medical products, Dave returned to his roots in performing, songwriting, and entered the world of recording.

In late 2016, Dave and his cousin Frank Cox decided to form Rocktown Revival as a way to deliver Dave's original music alongside songs from some of the greatest American artists to folks who, like themselves, enjoy the revival of roots-based music. In addition to Dave Miller, Rocktown Revival includes veterans Frank Cox on guitar, Leslie McBryde on vocals, Bill Thurman on fiddle, Bill McCumber on bass, and B.J. Davis on drums. Their 40+ year careers, which they spent the majority of playing together, have included forays into the roots of country and folk rock, foundational Americana, driving banjo-fueled bluegrass, blues, rockabilly, and jazz.

In November 2016, in collaboration with, and as a tribute to, his Gumbo bandmate Pat Hooper, Dave Miller released his first album, titled Just Flow: The Tribute Sessions. The recording of this album was started in Memphis, Tennessee, at Easley McCain Recording in 2013 and finished at Howlin' Dog Studios in Alamosa, Colorado, in 2016.

Subsequently, in December 2017, Dave released an album of 12 of his original songs, titled Southern Dreams, which was also recorded at Howlin' Dog Records.

In October 2019, Dave Miller released another album featuring 12 of his original songs, titled Beauty Path. His first release to appear on the Howlin' Dog Records label, Beauty Path was recorded and engineered by Don Richmond at Howlin' Dog Studios in Alamosa, Colorado. The album was produced by both Don Richmond and Dave Miller.

Dave also formed the Memphis-based duo Mulberry Branch with fiddler Bill Thurman. In addition, Dave fronts the Mid-South touring group Rocktown Revival, a six-piece band including Dave's cousin, Frank Cox, started in late 2016. The group toured with both Dave's original music and covers of songs by other roots-based American artists.

In January 2026, he released "Party in the Pines," again with Howlin' Dog Studios.

== Influences ==
Dave Miller began playing music at age 13 when his mother bought him a five-string banjo for Christmas the year his father died. He would tune it up and play along with the country and bluegrass stars who performed on the Saturday afternoon music shows. He sometimes jokes that it was the great Earl Scruggs himself who taught Dave to play the banjo—Dave sitting on his sofa in Little Rock, Earl in the television studio in Nashville. Dave joined his first band, The 49ers, shortly thereafter in 1964 at the age of 14. Miller cites Levon Helm, Merle Haggard, Delbert McClinton, Guy Clark, and John Prine as influences.

== Collaborations ==
In November 2016, in collaboration with, and as a tribute to, his Gumbo bandmate Pat Hooper, Dave Miller released his first album, titled Just Flow: The Tribute Sessions. Recording for this album was started in Memphis, Tennessee, at Easley McCain Recording and finished at Howlin' Dog Studios in Alamosa, Colorado.

From late 2013 to early 2014, Dave and his long-time collaborator, Pat Hooper, decided to take some of their original tunes into the studio together. They began working with Davis McCain at Easley- McCain Studios, where they captured the rhythm, bass, and lead vocal tracks for the songs. Then, on April 2, 2014, Pat died. As Dave Miller recounts in the liner notes for the album:

"Pat and I played together for about 30 years, off and on, touring together in the hillbilly rock fusion band, Gumbo, in the late '70s and early '80s. Pat performed his entire adult life in countless combos, touring back-up bands, and traveling family shows, and played in venues across the U.S. and Canada. His sudden death broke the heart of the community that loved him so much. It also meant the tracks lay untouched for 2 years and the future of the project looked uncertain at best. Musician friends that I spoke to encouraged me to finish the project and offered their help—Gumbo bandmates, players who had traveled the same circuits, Pat's friends. Without exception, these are premier players and singers that have decades of experience on stage and in the studio and who wanted to be a part of finishing what Pat and I had started."

Recording for the album was completed at Howlin' Dog Studios in late 2016.

== Discography ==
Just Flow: The Tribute Sessions (November 2016)

1. The Walk (Pat Hooper) 4:28
2. Café Afternoon (Dave Miller) 4:26
3. Pistol And Bible (Dave Miller) 4:31
4. Baby Loves The Wind (Dave Miller) 3:13
5. Reggae Heart (Dave Miller) 3:01
6. My Everything (Dave Miller) 3:04
7. Play Lily Play (Dave Miller) 5:23
8. Sailor's Rest (Dave Miller, Sterling Smith) 4:39
9. The Miner (Pat Hooper) 4:40
10. Just Flow (Dave Miller) 4:10

Just Flow: The Tribute Sessions is the first studio album by American singer-songwriter Dave Miller. An independent release, the album was recorded at Howlin' Dog Studios in Alamosa, Colorado, and Easley-McCain Studios in Memphis, Tennessee. Don Richmond, Dave Miller, and Davis McCain engineered Just Flow: The Tribute Sessions, and Don Richmond and Dave Miller produced the album.

Southern Dreams (December 2017)

1. Big Boy, Big Breakfast (Dave Miller) 3:26
2. Cowboy's Last Show (Dave Miller) 5:15
3. Right Wrong Turn (Dave Miller) 3:36
4. Counting On Love (Dave Miller) 4:10
5. Rollin' Off A Log (Dave Miller) 2:41
6. Too Far Gone (Dave Miller) 4:02
7. Shiny Shoes (Dave Miller) 4:13
8. I Miss Yesterday (Dave Miller) 4:38
9. She's So Gone (Dave Miller) 3:33
10. Love Light (Dave Miller) 4:45
11. The Hat (Dave Miller) 5:33
12. Dry Spell (Dave Miller) 4:50

Southern Dreams is the second studio album by American singer-songwriter Dave Miller. The album features 12 of Dave's original songs. An independent release, Southern Dreams was recorded and engineered by Don Richmond at Howlin' Dog Studios in Alamosa, Colorado. The album was produced by Don Richmond and Dave Miller.

Beauty Path (October 2019)

1. Long Road Home (Dave Miller) 4:12
2. I Will (Dave Miller) 4:16
3. Beauty Path (Dave Miller) 5:11
4. Uncle Levi's Wooden Leg (Dave Miller) 5:10
5. Full Life (Dave Miller) 4:15
6. Valley Of The Song (Dave Miller) 4:39
7. What's In The Gumbo, Mama (Dave Miller) 4:16
8. New Boots (Dave Miller) 4:18
9. Sunrise In My Heart (Dave Miller) 2:57
10. Freeport (Dave Miller) 3:04
11. Grandfather Tree (Dave Miller) 4:20
12. Heart Like A Wineglass (Dave Miller) 4:06

Beauty Path is the third studio album by American singer-songwriter Dave Miller. The album features 12 of Dave's original songs. His first release to appear on the Howlin' Dog Records label, Beauty Path was recorded and engineered by Don Richmond at Howlin' Dog Studios in Alamosa, Colorado. The album was produced by both Don Richmond and Dave Miller.

Party in the Pines (January 2026)

1. Jaded Soul
2. Baby Loves the Wind
3. Party in the Pines
4. Loser's Prayer
5. Only Time Can Tell
6. Mama Raised a Fool
7. Stubborn Heart
8. Greenhorn's Lament
9. Clementine
10. Cafe Afternoon
11. Memphis BBQ Blues
12. Nail Can
13. Backside of a Guitar
14. Rain
