= Parable of the Rich Fool =

Parable taught by Jesus of Nazareth according to the Christian Gospel of Luke

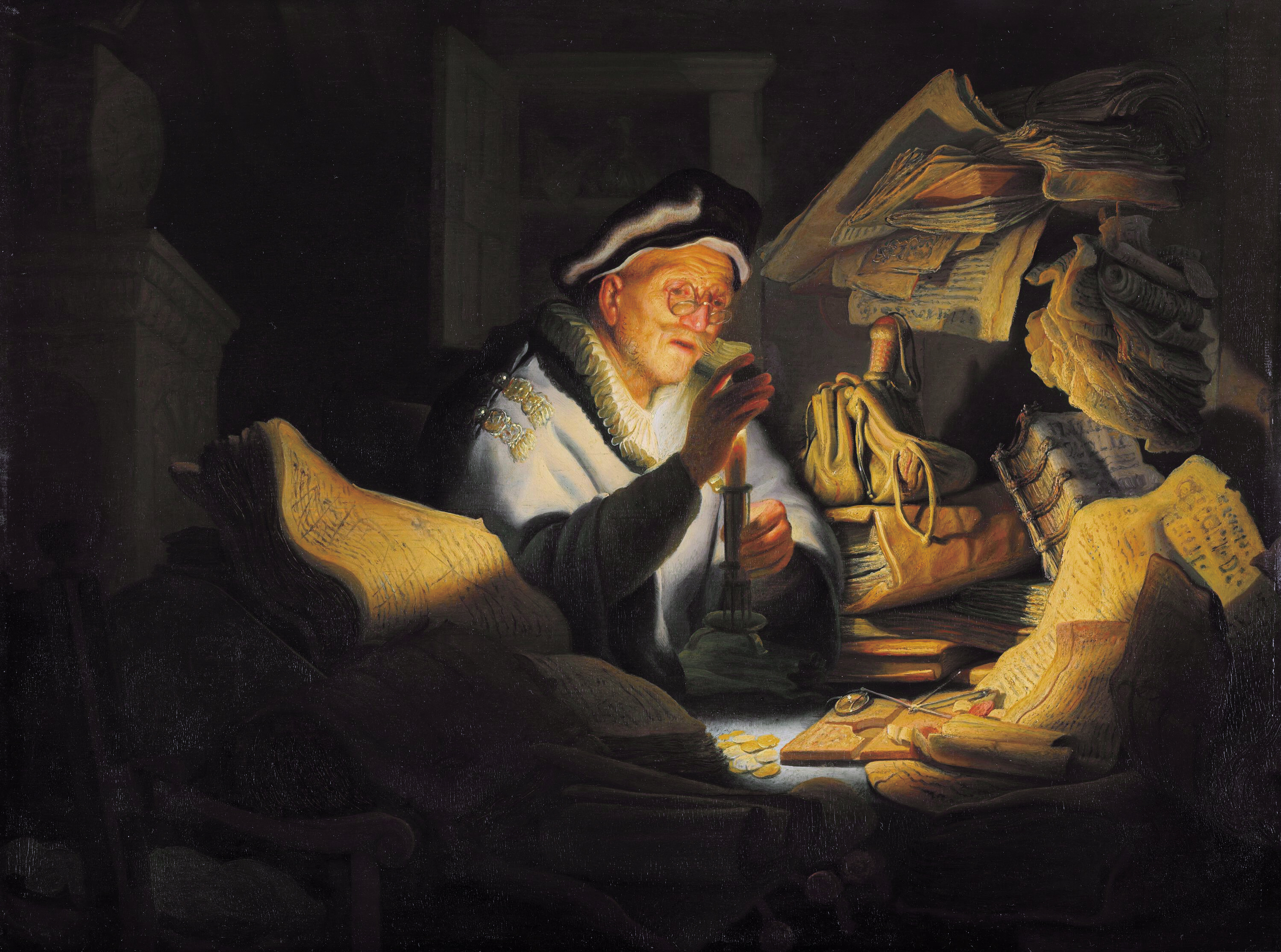
The Parable of the Rich Fool by Rembrandt, 1627.

The Parable of the Rich Fool is a parable of Jesus which appears in the Gospel of Luke. It depicts the futility of the belief that wealth can secure prosperity or a good life.

This parable has been depicted by several artists, including Rembrandt, Jan Luyken, James Tissot, and David Teniers the Younger.

== Narrative ==
The parable is introduced by a member of the crowd listening to Jesus, who tries to enlist Jesus' help in a family financial dispute:

One of the multitude said to him, "Teacher, tell my brother to divide the inheritance with me." But he said to him, "Man, who made me a judge or an arbitrator over you?" He said to them, "Beware! Keep yourselves from covetousness, for a man's life doesn't consist of the abundance of the things which he possesses."

— Luke 12:13–15, World English Bible

In Luke's account Jesus then responds with the parable:

He spoke a parable to them, saying, "The ground of a certain rich man brought forth abundantly. He reasoned within himself, saying, 'What will I do, because I don't have room to store my crops?' He said, 'This is what I will do. I will pull down my barns, and build bigger ones, and there I will store all my grain and my goods. I will tell my soul, "Soul, you have many goods laid up for many years. Take your ease, eat, drink, be merry."' "But God said to him, 'You foolish one, tonight your soul is required of you. The things which you have prepared—whose will they be?' So is he who lays up treasure for himself, and is not rich toward God."

— Luke 12:16–21, World English Bible

An abbreviated version of this parable also appears in the non-canonical Gospel of Thomas (Saying 63).

== Interpretation ==
Jesus does not address the inheritance question. Verna Holyhead notes that Numbers 27:1-11 and Deuteronomy 21:15-17 provide the relevant Mosaic teaching. A parable is given in place of a judgment.

The rich farmer in the parable is portrayed negatively, as an example of greed. By replacing his existing barn, he avoids using agricultural land for storage purposes, thus maximising his income, as well as allowing him to wait for a price increase before selling. St. Augustine comments that the farmer was "planning to fill his soul with excessive and unnecessary feasting and was proudly disregarding all those empty bellies of the poor. He did not realize that the bellies of the poor were much safer storerooms than his barns." Holyhead notes the absence of any family consultation by this "self-centred" man.

Arland J. Hultgren comments that the parable "provides an example of what one ought not to be like. The person whose identity is tied up with his or her possessions, status, and/or achievements—and is driven by acquiring them—can so easily end up unaware of the call of God and the need of the neighbor." The farmer's conversation with himself is self-centred: first-person pronouns occur 11 times.

The farmer's foolishness lies particularly in the fact that wealth cannot guarantee the future: the Day of Judgment arrives sooner than he expects.

Ellicott's Commentary notes the difference between the fool's approach and the psalmist's:

Return unto thy rest, O my soul; for the LORD hath dealt bountifully with thee.

"The psalmist's repose is not the worldling's serenity nor the sensualist's security, but the repose of the quiet conscience and the trusting heart".

Cornelius a Lapide in his great commentary explains the parable, writing,

The meaning is, This is a matter of the courts which dispose of secular questions: it has no part in Me, who teach and dispense a heavenly heritage. Christ does not here deny that He has judicial power, for He was the King of kings and the Lord of lords; but He wished to use His power over a covetous man to cure him of his greed, and to teach him to prefer heavenly to earthly things, and to give way willingly to them, according to His own words, 6:29, “From him that takes away thy cloak withhold not thy coat also.” “He rightly sets aside earthly things,” says S. Ambrose, "who came down to us for heavenly ones. Hence this brother is rebuked not undeservedly, for he would fain have occupied the dispenser of heavenly things with those of earth". At the same time He taught that ecclesiastics and spiritual persons ought not to meddle with secular things, but to employ themselves in divine ones, as St. Paul says, 2 Tim 2:4, "No soldier on service entangleth himself in the affairs of this life."

John McEvilly comments on the second part, writing "The rich man thus pondered secretly in his own mind; for, “he thought within himself” (v. 17). But, his thoughts were heard and examined in Heaven, which is not slow in pronouncing judgment on him. “But God said to him,” either by some secret inspiration, or some sudden mortal stroke, sending him a mortal disease, which was taking him out of life and thus showing his folly; or by an angel, “thou fool,” while thou hast not a day which thou canst call thine own, thou promisest thyself many years, on which all thy calculations of long happiness are based. Such is the judgment, not of man, but of Divine wisdom regarding him, and, indeed, it is not difficult even for man, enlightened by faith, to pronounce the same."

In verse 20, this night will be "required of you", Greek: αιτουσιν απο σου (aitousin apo sou). This phrase would be used when demanding repayment of a loan.

== In arts ==
The parable was represented by several artists including Rembrandt, Jan Luyken, James Tissot, and David Teniers the Younger.

== See also ==
- Jesus and the rich young man
- Gospel of Luke: Chapter 12
- Life of Jesus in the New Testament
- Ministry of Jesus
