= David Miller (physician) =

Australian physician (21st century)

David Miller is a pioneer in the home birth movement in Australia. He not only practiced at home, with a staff of midwives, but also adapted the water birth techniques of Michel Odent to a hospital setting.

== Critical reception to home birth ==
At one stage, home birth became acceptable in Australia. However, growing safety concerns and insurance-driven conservatism has driven home birth underground. Miller believes that this is a dangerous development, as trained home-birth has become free-birth, which is practiced without professional help and is a life-threatening danger to both babies and mothers.

Miller is a regular contributor to "GP Speak" and "The Byron Shire Echo" and has written a book: Birth at Home, Doubleday Book Club (1990) ISBN 0-86824-422-8
