= David E Miller Hill =

Hill on Fremont Island, Utah

Coordinates: 41°09′17″N 112°19′48″W

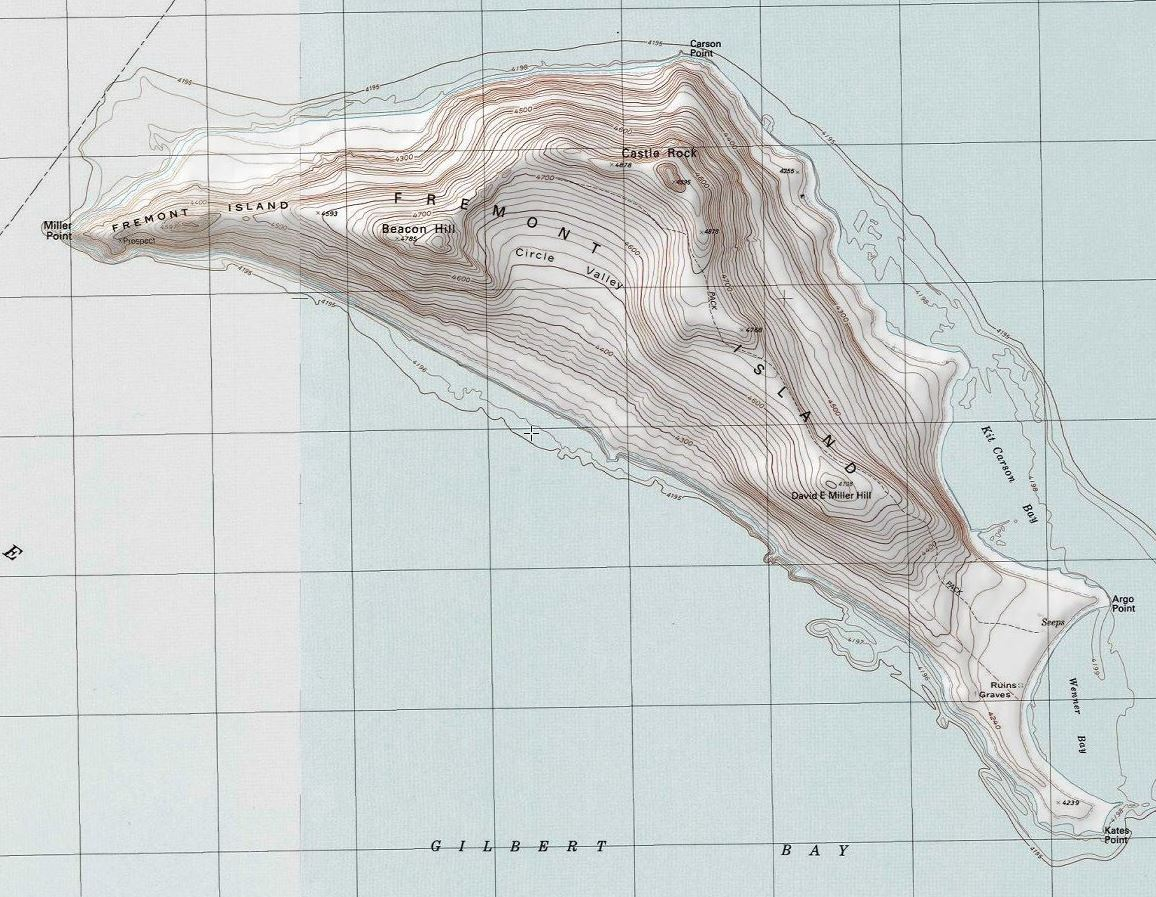
Fremont Island topographical map showing David E Miller Hill

David E Miller Hill is a summit in Weber County, Utah, United States with an elevation of 4,705 feet (1,434 m). It is located near the southeast edge of Fremont Island in the Great Salt Lake.

David E Miller Hill was named for David E. Miller, a state geography official.

== History ==
The name of the hill was established by the Utah State Committee on Geographical Names on November 13, 1980. It was verified by the U.S. Board on Geographic Names on January 1, 1981.
