= David W. Miller =

American academic

David W. Miller is a researcher and lecturer in the Keller Center for Innovation in Engineering Education at Princeton University, Director of the Princeton University Faith & Work Initiative, and scholar of the "faith at work" movement. Previously he taught for five years at the Yale School of Management and the Yale Divinity School and was the founding Executive Director of the Yale Center for Faith & Culture. Prior to academia he was a senior executive in international business for 16 years.

Miller serves as an advisor and scholar on questions pertaining to ethics, leadership, and the role of faith at work. He is a Senior Fellow at The Trinity Forum, and frequent speaker at gatherings of business leaders, corporate events, and academic conferences. His views are often cited in the media, including in the New York Times, Wall Street Journal, Fortune Magazine, radio, and the major television networks.

Miller is also the author of God at Work: The History and Promise of the Faith at Work Movement (Oxford University Press, 2007)
