= 2002 Great Alaska Shootout =

American college basketball tournament

- Season: 2002–03
- Teams: 8 (men's), 4 (women's)
- Finals site: Sullivan Arena, Anchorage, Alaska
- Champions: College of Charleston (men's); Indiana (women's)
- MVP: Troy Wheless, College of Charleston (men's); Laura Ingham, Nevada (women's)

The 2002 Great Alaska Shootout was held November 27, 2002, through November 30, 2002 at Sullivan Arena in Anchorage, Alaska

== Brackets ==
=== Men's ===
5th Place Game; November 30
Wyoming	72
Loyola Marymount	65
7th Place Game
Alaska Anchorage	69
Montana	62

Consolation 2nd Round; November 29
Alaska Anchorage	69
Wyoming	77
Loyola Marymount	65
Montana	62

First Round; November 27, 28
Alaska Anchorage	69
Oklahoma State	98
College of Charleston	81
Wyoming	72
Loyola Marymount	71
Villanova	87
Montana	60
9	Michigan State	80

Semifinals; November 29
Oklahoma State	58
College of Charleston	66
Villanova	81
9	Michigan State	73

Championship; November 30
College of Charleston	71
Villanova	69
3rd Place Game
Oklahoma State	64
9	Michigan State	61

=== Women's ===
Semifinals; November 26
Alaska Anchorage	49
Nevada	67
Eastern Kentucky	49
Indiana	61

Championship; November 27
Nevada	68
Indiana	56
3rd Place game November 27
Alaska Anchorage	74
Eastern Kentucky	77
