= 2003 Great Alaska Shootout =

American college basketball tournament

- Season: 2003–04
- Teams: 8 (men's), 4 (women's)
- Finals site: Sullivan Arena, Anchorage, Alaska
- Champions: Purdue (men's); Alaska Anchorage (women's)
- MVP: Kenneth Lowe, Purdue (men's); Kamie Jo Massey, Alaska Anchorage (women's)

The 2003 Great Alaska Shootout was held November 26, 2003, through November 26, 2003 at Sullivan Arena in Anchorage, Alaska

== Brackets ==
=== Men's ===
5th Place Game; November 29
Alaska Anchorage | 72
Canisius | 67
7th Place Game
Texas State | 62
Pacific | 55

Consolation 2nd Round; November 28
Alaska Anchorage | 80
Texas State | 59
Canisius | 62
Pacific | 59

First Round; November 26, 27
Alaska Anchorage | 57
Seton Hall | 62
Texas State | 50
Purdue | 61
Liberty | 65
Canisius | 48
Pacific | 69
2 | Duke | 82

Semifinals; November 28
Seton Hall | 63
Purdue | 75
Liberty | 47
2 | Duke | 76

Championship; November 29
Purdue | 78
2 | Duke | 68
3rd Place Game
Seton Hall | 65
Liberty | 47

=== Women's ===
Semifinals; November 25
Alaska Anchorage | 61
Mount St. Mary's | 59
BYU | 56
Clemson | 62

Championship; November 26
Alaska Anchorage | 61
Clemson | 58
3rd Place game November 26
Mount St. Mary's | 47
BYU | 70
