= 2010 Kent Predators season =

Indoor Football League team season

- Owner: Chris Kokalis; Ken Moninski
- Head coach: William McCarthy
- Home stadium: ShoWare Center; 625 West James Street; Kent, WA 98032

Results
- Record: 5-9
- Division place: 3rd Pacific
- Playoffs: did not qualify

The 2010 Kent Predators season was the team's first season as a professional indoor football franchise and first in the Indoor Football League (IFL). One of twenty-five teams competing in the IFL for the 2010 season, the Kent, Washington-based Kent Predators were members of the Pacific Division of the Intense Conference.

Under the leadership of head coach William McCarthy, the team played their home games at the ShoWare Center in Kent, Washington.

The franchise was originally going to play in Wasilla, Alaska as the Arctic Predators, but complications between the ownership and the would-be head coach led to difficulty in obtaining a lease, so the IFL and the Arctic Predators split ways.

== Schedule ==
Win Tie Loss Bye

=== Regular season ===
Week	Day	Date	Kickoff	Opponent	Results		Location
Week	Day	Date	Kickoff	Opponent	Final Score	Team record	Location
1	Sunday	February 28	4:00pm	at Billings Outlaws	L 40-56	0-1	Rimrock Auto Arena at MetraPark
2	Monday	March 8	7:05pm	at Alaska Wild	L 39-48	0-2	Sullivan Arena
3	Friday	March 12	7:35pm	Fairbanks Grizzlies	L 42-57	0-3	ShoWare Center
4	Bye						
5	Saturday	March 27	7:05pm	at Tri-Cities Fever	W 55-49	1-3	Toyota Center
6	Bye						
7	Friday	April 9	7:05pm	Alaska Wild	W 59-54	2-3	ShoWare Center
8	Sunday	April 18	3:05pm	Tri-Cities Fever	W 53-33	3-3	ShoWare Center
9	Saturday	April 24	7:05pm	at Chicago Slaughter	L 29-71	3-4	Sears Centre
10	Friday	April 30	7:30pm	Billings Outlaws	L 30-54	3-5	ShoWare Center
11	Saturday	May 8	7:05pm	at Tri-Cities Fever	L 24-71	3-6	Toyota Center
12	Friday	May 14	7:30pm	Fairbanks Grizzlies	W 42-26	4-6	ShoWare Center
13	Bye						
14	Saturday	May 29	7:05pm	Billings Outlaws	L 47-53	4-7	ShoWare Center
15	Friday	June 4	7:05pm	Tri-Cities Fever	L 50-57	4-8	ShoWare Center
16	Saturday	June 12	7:05pm	at Fairbanks Grizzlies	L 42-49	4-9	Carlson Center
17	Saturday	June 19	7:05pm	at Alaska Wild	W 1-0 (forfeit)	5-9	Sullivan Arena

== Standings ==
2010 Pacific North Division
	W	L	T	PCT	GB	DIV	PF	PA	STK
y-Billings Outlaws	12	2	0	0.857	---	9-1	740	521	W3
x-Fairbanks Grizzlies	9	5	0	0.643	3.0	7-5	582	599	W3
x-Tri-Cities Fever	7	7	0	0.500	5.0	7-6	670	646	L1
Kent Predators	5	9	0	0.357	7.0	5-8	555	678	W1
~~Alaska Wild~~	~~2~~	~~12~~	~~0~~	~~0.143~~	~~10.0~~	~~2-10~~	~~377~~	~~457~~	~~L11~~

== Roster ==
2010 Kent Predators roster
Quarterbacks: 1 Charles McCullum; 16 Brandon Pederson; Running backs: 2 Jarvis Dunn; 7 Carlo Heard; Wide receivers: 15 Andre Piper-Jordan; 9 Travis Poole; 4 Eric Taylor	Offensive linemen: 50 Tony Grote; 69 Anthony Jackson; 65 Galuefa Salu; 55 Lavon Ward; Defensive linemen: 93 John Fields; 56 Manase Hopoi; 44 C. J. Niusulu	Linebackers: 40 Walner Leandre; 12 A. J. Wallace; Defensive backs: 13 Jeremiah Captain; 10 Anthony Galloway; 5 Broderick Jamison; 8 DeVon Walker; Kickers: 14 Dan Kleckner	Injured Reserve: 9 Aaron Striten WR; Exempt List: currently vacant; rookies in italics Roster updated June 12, 2010; 21 Active, 0 Inactive → More rosters
