= 2014 Great Alaska Shootout =

American college basketball tournament

- Season: 2014–15
- Teams: 8 (men's), 4 (women's)
- Finals site: Alaska Airlines Center, Anchorage, Alaska
- Champions: Colorado State (men's); Long Beach State (women's)
- MVP: Alan Williams, UC Santa Barbara (men's); Megan Mullings, Alaska Anchorage (women's)

The 2014 GCI Great Alaska Shootout was the 36th Great Alaska Shootout, the annual college basketball tournament in Anchorage, Alaska that features colleges from all over the United States. The event was scheduled from November 26 through November 29, 2014, with eight colleges and universities participating in the men's tournament and four universities participating in the women's tournament. Most of the games in the men's tournament were televised on the CBS Sports Network.

== Brackets ==
* – Denotes overtime period

=== Men's ===
5th Place Game; November 29
Missouri State	84
Washington State	89*
7th Place Game
Alaska Anchorage	65
Rice	54

Consolation 2nd Round; November 28
Alaska Anchorage	51
Missouri State	55
Rice	74
Washington State	76

First Round; November 26, 27
Pacific	71
Alaska Anchorage	62
Missouri State	61
Colorado State	76
Rice	71
Mercer	77
Washington State	43
UC Santa Barbara	71

Semifinals; November 28
Pacific	64
Colorado State	75
Mercer	60
UC Santa Barbara	65*

Championship; November 29
Colorado State	65
UC Santa Barbara	63
3rd Place Game
Pacific	55
Mercer	48

=== Women's ===
Semi-Finals; November 25
Long Beach State	68
Boise State	50
Yale	63
Alaska Anchorage	72

Championship; November 26
Long Beach State	69
Alaska Anchorage	60
3rd Place game November 26
Boise State	59
Yale	53*
