= 2005 Great Alaska Shootout =

American college basketball tournament

- Season: 2005–06
- Teams: 8 (men's), 4 (women's)
- Finals site: Sullivan Arena, Anchorage, Alaska
- Champions: Marquette (men's); Central Connecticut State (women's)
- MVP: Steve Novak, Marquette (men's); Gabriella Guegbelet, Central Connecticut State (women's)

The 2005 Great Alaska Shootout was held November 23, 2005, through November 26, 2005 at Sullivan Arena in Anchorage, Alaska

== Brackets ==
* – Denotes overtime period

=== Men's ===
5th Place Game; November 25
USC	57
Alaska Anchorage	56
7th Place Game
Eastern Washington	72
Southern Illinois	80

Consolation 2nd Round; November 25
USC	69
Eastern Washington	51
Alaska Anchorage	72
Southern Illinois	64

First Round; November 23, 24
USC	48
Oral Roberts	68
Eastern Washington	73
Marquette	83
Alaska Anchorage	60
South Carolina	65
Monmouth	80
Southern Illinois	68

Semifinals; November 25
Oral Roberts	70
Marquette	73
South Carolina	62
Monmouth	56

Championship; November 25
Marquette	92*
South Carolina	89
3rd Place Game
Oral Roberts	62
Monmouth	54

=== Women's ===
Semifinals; November 22
Alaska Anchorage	51
Central Connecticut	77
Furman	63
Arizona	96

Championship; November 23
Central Connecticut	69*
Arizona	65
3rd Place game November 23
Alaska Anchorage	54
Furman	74
