= 2009 Great Alaska Shootout =

American college basketball tournament

- Season: 2009–10
- Teams: 6 (men's), 4 (women's)
- Finals site: Sullivan Arena, Anchorage, Alaska
- Champions: Washington State (men's); Alaska Anchorage(women's)
- MVP: Klay Thompson, Washington State (men's); Nicci Miller, Alaska Anchorage (women's)

The 2009 Great Alaska Shootout, was the 31st Great Alaska Shootout competition, the annual college basketball tournament in Anchorage, Alaska that features colleges from all over the United States. The 2009 event was held from November 25, 2010, through November 28, 2009.

== Men's ==
For the 2009 Tournament with a 6 team field, teams were split into pools of three utilizing a Round-robin tournament format.

=== Pools ===
==== Pool A ====
November 25
Alaska Anchorage	68
Washington State	87

November 26
Alaska Anchorage	72
Nicholls State	58

November 27
Washington State	78
Nicholls State	69

==== Pool B ====
November 25
San Diego	76
Oklahoma	64

November 26
Houston	100
Oklahoma	93

November 27
San Diego	72
Houston	65

===== Championship Round =====
November 28; Fifth Place Game
Oklahoma	81
Nicholls State	60

November 28; Third-place game
Alaska Anchorage	57
Houston	73

November 28; Championship
Washington State	93
San Diego	56

== Women's ==
=== Bracket ===
Semi-Finals; November 24
Alaska Anchorage	89
Coastal Carolina	47
Cincinnati	67
Western Carolina	54

Championship; November 25
Alaska Anchorage	49
Cincinnati	48
3rd Place game November 24
Coastal Carolina	72
Western Carolina	64
