= 2001 Great Alaska Shootout =

American college basketball tournament

- Season: 2001–02
- Teams: 8 (men's), 4 (women's)
- Finals site: Sullivan Arena, Anchorage, Alaska
- Champions: Marquette (men's); Iowa (women's)
- MVP: Dwyane Wade, Marquette (men's); Lindsey Meder, Iowa (women's)

The 2001 Great Alaska Shootout was held November 21, 2001, through November 24, 2001 at Sullivan Arena in Anchorage, Alaska.

== Brackets ==
=== Men's ===
5th Place Game; November 24
Tennessee	55
St. John's	69
7th Place Game
Alaska Anchorage	63
Oregon State	72

Consolation 2nd Round; November 23
Alaska Anchorage	54
Tennessee	74
Oregon State	63
St. John's	66

First Round; November 21, 22
Alaska Anchorage	66
20	Indiana	101
Marquette	85
Tennessee	74
Oregon State	68
Texas	78
St. John's	58
9	Gonzaga	65

Semifinals; November 23
20	Indiana	49
Marquette	50
Texas	54
9	Gonzaga	67

Championship; November 24
Marquette	72
Gonzaga	63
3rd Place Game
20	Indiana	77
Texas	71

=== Women's ===
Semifinals; November 20
Alaska Anchorage	45
Gonzaga	98
Iowa	69
Marquette	54

Championship; November 21
Gonzaga	72
Iowa	90
3rd Place game November 21
Alaska Anchorage	50
Marquette	88
