= 2016–17 Oakland Golden Grizzlies men's basketball team =

American college basketball season

2016–17 Oakland Golden Grizzlies men's basketball

Horizon League regular season co-champions

NIT, Second Round
- Conference: Horizon League
- Record: 25–9 (14–4 Horizon)
- Head coach: Greg Kampe (33rd season)
- Associate head coach: Dan Hipsher
- Assistant coaches: Cornell Mann; Drew Valentine
- Home arena: Athletics Center O'rena

2016–17 Horizon League men's basketball standings
	Conf.				Overall
Team	W		L	PCT	W		L	PCT
Oakland	14	–	4	.778	25	–	9	.735
Valparaiso	14	–	4	.778	24	–	9	.727
Green Bay	12	–	6	.667	18	–	14	.563
Northern Kentucky †	12	–	6	.667	24	–	11	.686
Wright State	11	–	7	.611	20	–	12	.625
UIC	7	–	11	.389	17	–	19	.472
Detroit	6	–	12	.333	8	–	23	.258
Cleveland State	5	–	13	.278	9	–	22	.290
Youngstown State	5	–	13	.278	13	–	21	.382
Milwaukee	4	–	14	.222	11	–	24	.314
† 2017 Horizon League Tournament winner

The 2016–17 Oakland Golden Grizzlies men's basketball team represented Oakland University (OU) during the 2016–17 NCAA Division I men's basketball season. The Golden Grizzlies were led by 33rd year head coach Greg Kampe and played their home games at the Athletics Center O'rena in Rochester, Michigan as members of the Horizon League. They finished the season 25–9, 14–4 in Horizon League play to finish in a share for the Horizon League regular season championship. As the No. 1 seed, they were upset in the quarterfinals of the Horizon League tournament by Youngstown State. As a conference champion and No. 1 seed who failed to win their conference tournament, they received an automatic bid to the National Invitation Tournament where they defeated Clemson in the first round to advance to the second round where they lost to Richmond.

Oakland made a three-point field goal in every game of the season, increasing their steak to 904 consecutive games, the ninth-longest active NCAA Division I streak. They last finished a game without a three-pointer on January 30, 1988.

== Off-season ==
Would-be senior point guard Kay Felder forwent his college eligibility and entered the 2016 NBA draft. He was drafted in the second round by the Atlanta Hawks, who traded him to the defending champion Cleveland Cavaliers for cash considerations.

Associate head coach Saddi Washington left Oakland to become an assistant coach for the Michigan Wolverines men's basketball team while assistant coach Dionne Phelps left to return to Arizona to be with his family. Washington and Phelps were replaced by Dan Hipsher and Cornell Mann.

The Golden Grizzlies received a commitment from junior college point guard Stevie Clark. Clark transferred from Arkansas Baptist College where he played a season after being dismissed from Oklahoma State after his 2013–14 freshman year. Clark was previously a four-star recruit and was ranked the No. 68 high school senior in 2013.

Oakland also received a commitment from 22-year old, United States Army veteran Isaiah Brock. Kampe recruited Brock on an overseas coaching trip. He thought Brock was athletic, but did not have a lot of basketball experience and probably would not receive much playing time. However, he thought the team could benefit from having Brock on it. Kampe offered Brock a scholarship when his service contract was over. Initially the National Collegiate Athletic Association (NCAA) ruled Brock academically ineligible, but after the story made national news, the NCAA reconsidered and Brock was granted immediate eligibility.

Former Illinois guard Kendrick Nunn transferred to Oakland after he was removed from the team after pleading guilty to a misdemeanor battery charge. Nunn will sit out the 2016–17 season due to NCAA transfer rules and has one year of eligibility remaining for 2017–18. Nunn was named to the All-Big Ten Conference freshman team and averaged 10.6 points per game in his career at Illinois.

Guards Chris Gilbert and Alek Frascone both suffered anterior cruciate ligament (ACL) injuries and will miss the season.

== 2016 signing class ==
College recruiting information
Name	Hometown	School	Height	Weight	Commit date
Stevie Clark; PG	Oklahoma City, OK	Arkansas Baptist College	5 ft 10 in (1.78 m)	164 lb (74 kg)	May 6, 2016
Stevie Clark; PG	Recruit ratings: Scout: Rivals: ESPN:				
James Edwards, Jr. C	Seattle, WA	Franklin High School	6 ft 9 in (2.06 m)	190 lb (86 kg)	Apr 28, 2016
James Edwards, Jr. C	Recruit ratings: Scout: Rivals: ESPN:				
Brailen Neely; PG	Detroit, MI	Western International High School	5 ft 10 in (1.78 m)	155 lb (70 kg)	Apr 2, 2015
Brailen Neely; PG	Recruit ratings: Scout: Rivals: ESPN:				
Chris Palombizio; SG	Chesterton, IN	Don Bosco Preparatory School	6 ft 5 in (1.96 m)	200 lb (91 kg)	Sep 30, 2015
Chris Palombizio; SG	Recruit ratings: Scout: Rivals: ESPN:				
Billy Thomas; PG	Detroit, MI	North Farmington High School	6 ft 0 in (1.83 m)	175 lb (79 kg)	Apr 27, 2016
Billy Thomas; PG	Recruit ratings: Scout: Rivals: ESPN:				
Overall recruit ranking:
Note: In many cases, Scout, Rivals, 247Sports, On3, and ESPN may conflict in their listings of height and weight.; In these cases, the average was taken. ESPN grades are on a 100-point scale.; Sources: "Oakland Golden Grizzlies". ESPN.; "2016 Team Ranking". Rivals.

== Season ==
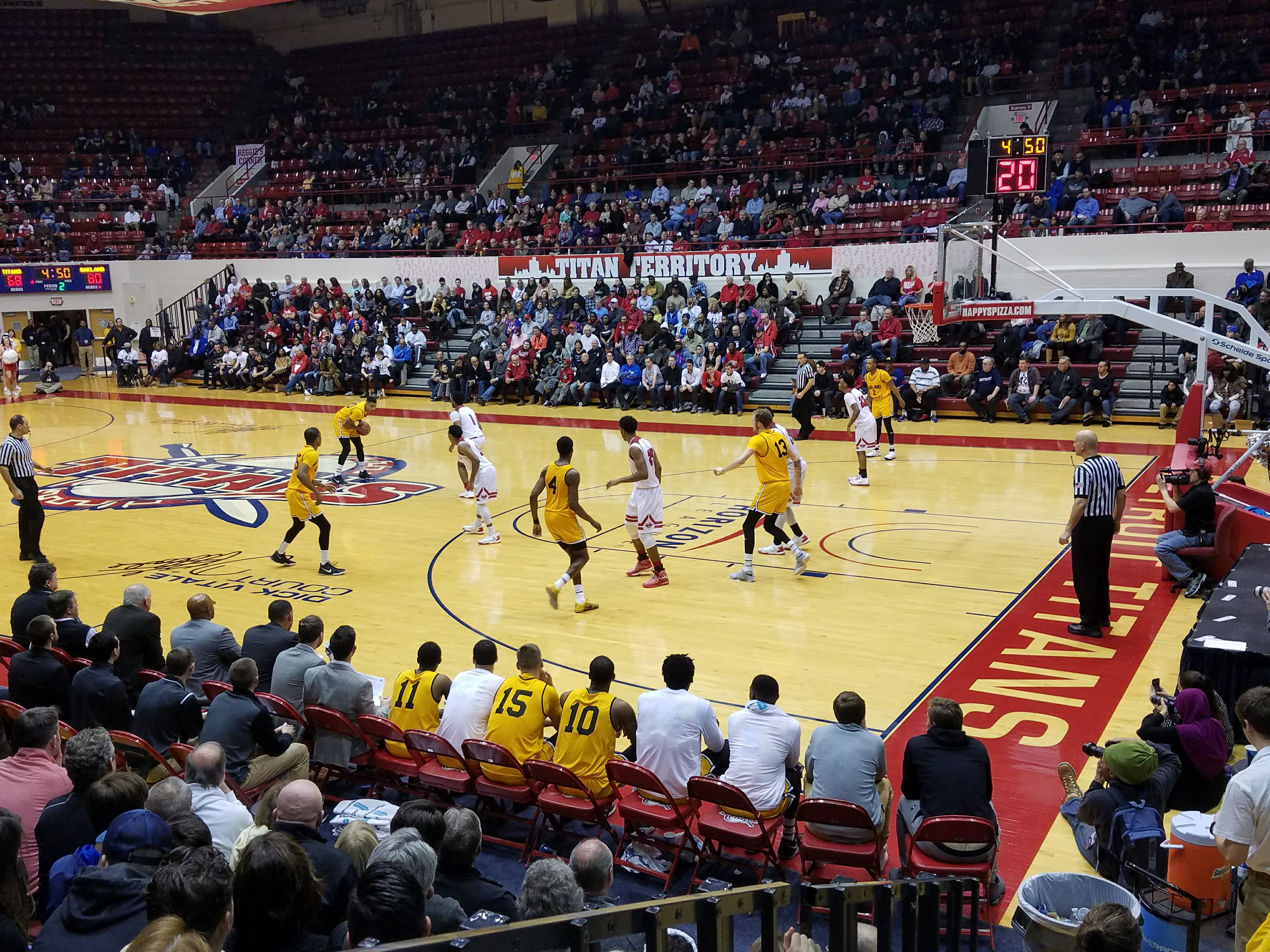
Second half against the Detroit Titans at Calihan Hall

Oakland finished in fourth place in the 2016 Great Alaska Shootout. They lost their first game to Nevada and defeated Alaska Anchorage in the consolation bracket and UC Davis in the fourth place game. Junior guard Martez Walker was named to the all-tournament team.

After their win over Robert Morris, the Golden Grizzlies improved to 9–1, their best start in Division I history. The best start in school history is 10–1 during the 1994–95 season.

During a three-game, four-day stretch in December, Oakland lost at home to Northeastern on a buzzer beater and at Michigan State in back-to-back days. Two days later, then defeated Georgia at home 86–79, in the then-fifth-highest attended game in Athletics Center O'rena history. With the win over Georgia, a member of the Southeastern Conference, Oakland is 4–2 all-time against Power Five conference schools at home.

In a low-scoring game against UIC, Oakland blocked a school and Horizon League record 18 shots, including one on the final possession to ensure a 58–57 win. The previous school record was 14 blocks, against Duquesne during the 2007–08 season. With the win, Oakland moved to 14–3 (4–0 in the Horizon League) and received a point in the Coaches Poll. They then lost four of the next five games and did not receive votes in any remaining polls.

Oakland set the all-time O'rena attendance record with 4,123 in a 93–88 upset loss against Detroit. The loss was OU's first conference loss of the season.

=== Awards ===
Brock was named Horizon League Freshman of the Week after averaging 7.3 points and 7.3 rebounds per game during the Great Alaska Shootout. Two weeks later, he received the same award again after scoring 9 points with 5 rebounds and 5 blocked shots in a win over Robert Morris. On February 6, Brock was named both the Freshman and Player of the Week. He was the first Horizon league player to receive both awards in the same week since the league began awarding a weekly newcomer in 2012. He averaged 15 points, 14 rebounds, 3 blocks and 1.5 steals per game in wins over Youngstown State and Cleveland State.

Brock was honored as a "Hometown Hero" by the National Football League's Detroit Lions during a game against the Chicago Bears. He was also honored as a veteran by the National Hockey League's Detroit Red Wings.

Hayes was named Horizon League Player of the Week January 30 after averaging 22.5 points and 12 rebounds in games against Green Bay and Milwaukee.

Walker was named Horizon League Player of the Week February 20. He averaged 22 points per game on 57% shooting in two wins over Valparaiso and UIC.

At the conclusion of the regular season, Hayes was named All-Conference First Team and Walker Second Team. Brock was named to the All-Defensive Team and All-Freshman Team.

== Roster ==
The following table lists Oakland's roster as of November 4, 2016.

2016–17 Oakland Golden Grizzlies men's basketball team
Players
Coaches

Pos.	#	Name	Height	Weight	Year	Previous school	Hometown
C	13	Brad Brechting	6 ft 11 in (2.11 m)	217 lb (98 kg)	So	Cedar Springs H.S.	Cedar Springs, Michigan
F	10	Isaiah Brock	6 ft 8 in (2.03 m)	191 lb (87 kg)	Fr	Forest Park H.S.	Baltimore, Maryland
G	5	Stevie Clark	5 ft 11 in (1.8 m)	181 lb (82 kg)	Jr	Oklahoma State	Oklahoma City, Oklahoma
F	32	Tom Cotter	6 ft 8 in (2.03 m)	232 lb (105 kg)	Jr	Wayne State	Williamston, Michigan
G	21	Jaevin Cumberland	6 ft 2 in (1.88 m)	179 lb (81 kg)	So	Wilmington H.S.	Wilmington, Ohio
G	2	Nick Daniels	6 ft 1 in (1.85 m)	170 lb (77 kg)	RS Jr	John Glenn H.S.	Westland, Michigan
G	30	Sherron Dorsey-Walker	6 ft 4 in (1.93 m)	211 lb (96 kg)	RS Sr	Iowa State	Detroit, Michigan
F	53	James Edwards, Jr. (redshirt)	6 ft 8 in (2.03 m)	184 lb (83 kg)	Fr	Franklin H.S.	Seattle, Washington
G	22	Alek Frascone (injured) (W)	6 ft 2 in (1.88 m)	212 lb (96 kg)	Jr	Utica Eisenhower H.S.	Washington Township, Michigan
G	0	Chris Gilbert (injured)	6 ft 2 in (1.88 m)	181 lb (82 kg)	Fr	Fenton H.S.	Fenton, Michigan
F	4	Jalen Hayes	6 ft 7 in (2.01 m)	213 lb (97 kg)	RS Jr	Sexton H.S.	Lansing, Michigan
F	14	Xavier Hill-Mais	6 ft 7 in (2.01 m)	248 lb (112 kg)	So	Page H.S.	Greensboro, North Carolina
G	11	Brailen Neely (W)	5 ft 9 in (1.75 m)	154 lb (70 kg)	Fr	Western H.S.	Detroit, Michigan
G	1	Kendrick Nunn (redshirt)	6 ft 3 in (1.91 m)	184 lb (83 kg)	Jr	Illinois	Chicago, Illinois
G/F	15	Chris Palombizio	6 ft 6 in (1.98 m)	212 lb (96 kg)	Fr	Don Bosco Prep	Chesterton, Indiana
G	35	Martez Walker	6 ft 6 in (1.98 m)	185 lb (84 kg)	RS Jr	Texas	Detroit, Michigan

Head coach

- Greg Kampe

Assistant coach(es)

- Dan Hipsher
- Cornell Mann
- Drew Valentine

Legend

- (C) Team captain
- (S) Suspended
- (I) Ineligible
- (W) Walk-on
- Injured
- Current redshirt

Roster
Last update: October 5, 2016

== Schedule ==
The following is Oakland's schedule. OU defeated Grand Valley State University in a November 7 exhibition game 98–68.

Date time, TV	Rank^{#}	Opponent^{#}	Result	Record	Site (attendance) city, state
Non-conference regular season
November 11, 2016*; 7:00 pm, WMYD/ESPN3		Bowling Green	W 78–70	1–0	Athletics Center O'rena (3,250); Rochester, MI
November 14, 2016*; 7:00 pm, WMYD/ESPN3		Western Michigan	W 77–60	2–0	Athletics Center O'rena (2,335); Rochester, MI
November 18, 2016*; 7:00 pm, WMYD/ESPN3		Goshen College; Great Alaska Shootout	W 102–59	3–0	Athletics Center O'rena (2,001); Rochester, MI
November 19, 2016*; 3:00 pm, WMYD/ESPN3		Chicago State	W 107–79	4–0	Athletics Center O'rena (2,301); Rochester, MI
November 24, 2016*; 1:15 am, CBSSN		vs. Nevada; Great Alaska Shootout	L 78–82	4–1	Alaska Airlines Center (2,698); Anchorage, AK
November 25, 2016*; 4:30 pm, GCI Cable–Alaska		at Alaska Anchorage; Great Alaska Shootout	W 71–65	5–1	Alaska Airlines Center (2,180); Anchorage, AK
November 26, 2016*; 6:00 pm, GCI Cable–Alaska		vs. UC Davis; Great Alaska Shootout	W 79–66	6–1	Alaska Airlines Center (2,150); Anchorage, AK
December 1, 2016*; 7:00 pm, WMYD/ESPN3		Oral Roberts	W 92–64	7–1	Athletics Center O'rena (2,607); Rochester, MI
December 3, 2016*; 3:00 pm, WMYD/ESPN3		Southern Utah	W 78–68	8–1	Athletics Center O'rena (2,984); Rochester, MI
December 10, 2016*; 4:00 pm		at Robert Morris	W 74–53	9–1	Charles L. Sewall Center (638); Moon Township, PA
December 20, 2016*; 7:00 pm, WMYD/ESPN3		Northeastern	L 59–61	9–2	Athletics Center O'rena (2,622); Rochester, MI
December 21, 2016*; 7:00 pm, BTN		at Michigan State	L 65–77	9–3	Breslin Student Events Center (14,797); East Lansing, MI
December 23, 2016*; 7:00 pm, WMYD/ESPN3		Georgia	W 86–79	10–3	Athletics Center O'rena (4,063); Rochester, MI
Horizon League regular season
December 29, 2016; 7:00 pm, WMYD/ESPN3		Wright State	W 81–62	11–3 (1–0)	Athletics Center O'rena (2,724); Rochester, MI
December 31, 2016; 3:00 pm, WMYD/ESPN3		Northern Kentucky	W 76–65	12–3 (2–0)	Athletics Center O'rena (2,417); Rochester, MI
January 6, 2017; 9:00 pm, ESPN2		at Valparaiso	W 78–66	13–3 (3–0)	Athletics–Recreation Center (3,872); Valparaiso, IN
January 8, 2017; 5:00 pm, ASN		at UIC	W 58–57	14–3 (4–0)	UIC Pavilion (1,970); Chicago, IL
January 13, 2017; 7:00 pm, ESPNU		Detroit	L 88–93	14–4 (4–1)	Athletics Center O'rena (4,123); Rochester, MI
January 16, 2017; 7:00 pm, ASN		Cleveland State	L 65–76	14–5 (4–2)	Athletics Center O'rena (2,135); Rochester, MI
January 20, 2017; 7:00 pm, ESPN3		at Northern Kentucky	W 79–70	15–5 (5–2)	BB&T Arena (4,784); Highland Heights, KY
January 22, 2017; 2:00 pm, ESPN3		at Wright State	L 67–88	15–6 (5–3)	Nutter Center (3,982); Fairborn, OH
January 27, 2017; 9:00 pm, ESPNU		Green Bay	L 72–80	15–7 (5–4)	Athletics Center O'rena (3,239); Rochester, MI
January 29, 2017; 1:00 pm, ASN		Milwaukee	W 79–70 ^{OT}	16–7 (6–4)	Athletics Center O'rena (2,902); Rochester, MI
February 2, 2017; 7:00 pm, ESPN3		at Youngstown State	W 90–76	17–7 (7–4)	Beeghly Center (1,550); Youngstown, OH
February 4, 2017; 2:00 pm, ASN		at Cleveland State	W 53–51	18–7 (8–4)	Wolstein Center (1,763); Cleveland, OH
February 10, 2017; 7:00 pm, WADL/ESPN3		at Detroit	W 89–80	19–7 (9–4)	Calihan Hall (6,275); Detroit, MI
February 17, 2017; 7:00 pm, ESPN2		Valparaiso	W 82–71	20–7 (10–4)	Athletics Center O'rena (3,991); Rochester, MI
February 19, 2017; 3:00 pm, ESPN3		UIC	W 87–75	21–7 (11–4)	Athletics Center O'rena (2,638); Rochester, MI
February 21, 2017; 7:00 pm, WMYD/ESPN3		Youngstown State	W 101–72	22–7 (12–4)	Athletics Center O'rena (2,553); Rochester, MI
February 24, 2017; 7:00 pm, ESPNU		at Green Bay	W 85–72	23–7 (13–4)	Resch Center (4,897); Green Bay, WI
February 26, 2017; 3:00 pm, ESPN3		at Milwaukee	W 86–75	24–7 (14–4)	Klotsche Center (1,227); Milwaukee, WI
Horizon League tournament
March 4, 2017; 5:30 pm, ESPN3	(1)	vs. (9) Youngstown State; Quarterfinals	L 80–81	24–8	Joe Louis Arena (8,481); Detroit, MI
NIT
March 14, 2017*; 8:00 pm, ESPNU	(7)	at (2) Clemson; First Round – Iowa Bracket	W 74–69	25–8	Littlejohn Coliseum (2,750); Clemson, SC
March 19, 2017*; 7:30 pm, ESPNU	(7)	at (6) Richmond; Second Round – Iowa Bracket	L 83–87	25–9	Robins Center (6,527); Richmond, VA
*Non-conference game. ^{#}Rankings from AP Poll. (#) Tournament seedings in parentheses. All times are in Eastern Time.
