= 2012 Great Alaska Shootout =

American college basketball tournament

- Season: 2012–13
- Teams: 8 (men's), 4 (women's)
- Finals site: Sullivan Arena, Anchorage, Alaska
- Champions: Charlotte (men's); Utah State (women's)
- MVP: Pierriá Henry, Charlotte (men's); Devyn Christensen, Utah State (women's)

The 2012 Carrs/Safeway Great Alaska Shootout was the 34th Great Alaska Shootout, the annual college basketball tournament in Anchorage, Alaska that features colleges from all over the United States. The event is scheduled from November 20, 2012, through November 24, 2012, with eight colleges and universities participating in the men's tournament and four universities participating in the women's tournament. Most of the games in the men's tournament were televised on the CBS Sports Network.

== Brackets ==
=== Men's ===
5th Place Game; November 24
Alaska Anchorage	83
Loyola Marymount	77
7th Place Game
UC Riverside	69
Texas State	81

Consolation 2nd Round; November 23
UC Riverside	65
Alaska Anchorage	66
Loyola Marymount	78
Texas State	63

First Round; November 21,22
UC Riverside	52
Northeastern	61
Belmont	74
Alaska Anchorage	60
Loyola Marymount	66
Oral Roberts	75
Texas State	64
Charlotte	73

Semifinals; November 23
Northeastern	74
Belmont	71
Oral Roberts	58
Charlotte	72

Championship; November 24
Northeastern	59
Charlotte	67
3rd Place Game
Belmont	70
Oral Roberts	67

=== Women's ===
Semi-Finals; November 20
Prairie View A&M	66
Utah State	67
North Dakota State	47
Alaska Anchorage	73

Championship; November 21
Utah State	67
Alaska Anchorage	57
3rd Place game November 21
Prairie View A&M	56
North Dakota State	61
