= 2008 Great Alaska Shootout =

American college basketball tournament

- Season: 2008–09
- Teams: 8 (men's), 4 (women's)
- Finals site: Sullivan Arena, Anchorage, Alaska
- Champions: San Diego State (men's); Alaska Anchorage (women's)
- MVP: Kyle Spain, San Diego State (men's); Jamilah Humes, Kent State (women's)

The 2008 Great Alaska Shootout was held from November 26, 2008, through November 29, 2008.

== Men's ==
* – Denotes overtime period

=== Bracket ===
5th Place Game; November 29
Northern Illinois	67
Western Carolina	71
7th Place Game
Alaska Anchorage	62
Louisiana Tech	57

Consolation 2nd Round; November 28
Alaska Anchorage	68
Northern Illinois	71
Louisiana Tech	62
Western Carolina	76

First Round; November 26, 27
Hampton	69
Alaska Anchorage	61
Northern Illinois	58
Portland State	79
Seattle	61
Louisiana Tech	46
San Diego State	59
Western Carolina	58

Semifinals; November 28
Hampton	77*
Portland State	71
Seattle	56
San Diego State	75

Championship; November 29
Hampton	47
San Diego State	76
3rd Place Game
Portland State	81
Seattle	67

== Women's ==
=== Bracket ===
Semifinals; November 25
Alaska Anchorage	72
Cal State Northridge	44
Syracuse	85
Jackson State	74

Championship; November 26
Alaska Anchorage	58
Syracuse	57
3rd Place game November 26
Cal State Northridge	65
Jackson State	73
