= 2016 Great Alaska Shootout =

American college basketball tournament

- Season: 2016–17
- Teams: 8 (men's), 4 (women's)
- Finals site: Alaska Airlines Center, Anchorage, Alaska
- Champions: Iona (men's); USC (women's)
- MVP: Sam Cassell Jr., Iona (men's); Kristen Simon, USC (women's)

The 2016 GCI Great Alaska Shootout was the 38th Great Alaska Shootout, the annual college basketball tournament that features colleges from all over the United States. All games were played at the Alaska Airlines Center in Anchorage, Alaska. The event took place November 23 through November 26, 2016 with eight schools participating in the men's tournament and four in the women's tournament. The men's first round, semifinals, and championship game were televised on CBS Sports Network. Iona won the men's tournament, defeating Nevada 75–73. In the women's tournament, USC defeated Portland.

== Brackets ==
=== Men's ===
5th Place Game; November 26
Oakland	79
UC Davis	66
7th Place Game
Alaska Anchorage	74
Drake	69

Consolation 2nd Round; November 25
Alaska Anchorage	65
Oakland	71
UC Davis	64
Drake	58

First Round; November 23,24
Buffalo	85
Alaska Anchorage	79
Nevada	82
Oakland	78
UC Davis	58
Weber State	86
Drake	53
Iona	64

Semifinals; November 25
Buffalo	62
Nevada	67
Weber State	54
Iona	76

Championship; November 26
Nevada	73
Iona	75
3rd Place Game
Buffalo	74
Weber State	72

=== Women's ===
First Round; November 22
1	Missouri State	67
4	USC	89
3	Portland	66
2	Alaska Anchorage	57

Championship Game; November 23
USC	67
Portland	54
3rd Place Game; November 23
Missouri State	65
Alaska Anchorage	58
