= 2007 Great Alaska Shootout =

American college basketball tournament

- Season: 2007–08
- Teams: 8 (men's), 4 (women's)
- Finals site: Sullivan Arena, Anchorage, Alaska
- Champions: Butler (men's); Alaska Anchorage (women's)
- MVP: Mike Green, Butler (men's); Rebecca Kielpinski, Alaska Anchorage (women's)

The 2007 Great Alaska Shootout was held from November 20, 2007, through November 24, 2007 at Sullivan Arena in Anchorage, Alaska

== Brackets ==
* – Denotes overtime period

=== Men's ===
5th Place Game; November 24
Michigan	69
Western Kentucky	73
7th Place Game
Eastern Washington	64
Alaska Anchorage	62

Consolation 2nd Round; November 22
Michigan	61
Eastern Washington	53
Western Kentucky	71
Alaska Anchorage	67

First Round; November 21
23	Butler	79
Michigan	65
Eastern Washington	52
Virginia Tech	69
Texas Tech	74
Alaska Anchorage	47
Western Kentucky	71
14	Gonzaga	74

Semifinals; November 22
23	Butler	84*
Virginia Tech	78
Texas Tech	73
14	Gonzaga	63

Championship; November 24
23	Butler	81
Texas Tech	71
3rd Place Game
Virginia Tech	64
14	Gonzaga	82

=== Women's ===
Semifinals; November 20
Cleveland State	72
Alaska Anchorage	80*
Bradley	61
Santa Clara	69

Championship; November 21
Alaska Anchorage	52
Santa Clara	50
3rd Place game November 21
Cleveland State	82
Bradley	61
