= 2010 Great Alaska Shootout =

American college basketball tournament

- Season: 2010–11
- Teams: 8 (men's), 4 (women's)
- Finals site: Sullivan Arena, Anchorage, Alaska
- Champions: St. John's (men's); Kent State(women's)
- MVP: Justin Brownlee, St. John's (men's); Jamilah Humes, Kent State (women's)

The 2010 Great Alaska Shootout, was the 32nd Great Alaska Shootout competition, the annual college basketball tournament in Anchorage, Alaska that features colleges from all over the United States. The 2011 event was held from November 24, 2010, through November 27, 2010.

== Brackets ==
* – Denotes overtime period

=== Men's ===
5th Place Game; November 27
Ball State	44
Alaska Anchorage	62
7th Place Game
Southern Utah	64
Houston Baptist	61

Consolation 2nd Round; November 26
Southern Utah	54
Ball State	73
Houston Baptist	67
Alaska Anchorage	74

First Round; November 24, 25
Drake	78
Southern Utah	59
St. John's	78*
Ball State	73
Arizona State	73
Houston Baptist	55
Weber State	86
Alaska Anchorage	54

Semifinals; November 26
Drake	32
St. John's	82
Arizona State	59
Weber State	58

Championship; November 27
St. John's	67
Arizona State	59
3rd Place Game
Drake	81
Weber State	82

=== Women's ===
Semi-Finals; November 23
Alaska Anchorage	48
San Jose State	35
Kent State	59
Washington	58

Championship; November 24
Alaska Anchorage	47
Kent State	53
3rd Place game November 24
San Jose State	27
Washington	49
