= 2015 Great Alaska Shootout =

American college basketball tournament

- Season: 2015–16
- Teams: 8 (men's), 4 (women's)
- Finals site: Alaska Airlines Center, Anchorage, Alaska
- Champions: Middle Tennessee (men's); WKU (women's)
- MVP: Nathan Boothe, Toledo (men's); Kendall Noble, WKU (women's)

The 2015 GCI Great Alaska Shootout was the 37th Great Alaska Shootout, the annual college basketball tournament in Anchorage, Alaska that featured colleges from all over the United States. The event took place from November 25 through November 28, 2015, with eight colleges and universities participating in the men's tournament and four universities participating in the women's tournament. Most of the games in the men's tournament are televised on the CBS Sports Network.

== Brackets ==
=== Men's ===
5th Place Game; November 28
San Jose State | 91
Alaska Anchorage | 87
7th Place Game
San Diego | 62
Drexel | 59

Consolation 2nd Round; November 27
San Jose State | 74
San Diego | 67
Alaska Anchorage | 71
Drexel | 65

First Round; November 25, 26
San Jose State | 74
Toledo | 89
San Diego | 57
Loyola–Chicago | 67
Middle Tennessee | 75
Alaska Anchorage | 72
Drexel | 66
UNC Asheville | 85

Semifinals; November 27
Toledo | 82
Loyola–Chicago | 74
Middle Tennessee | 63
UNC Asheville | 61

Championship; November 28
Toledo | 70
Middle Tennessee | 78
3rd Place Game
Loyola-Chicago | 48
UNC Asheville | 59

=== Women's ===
Semi-Finals; November 24
George Mason | 58
Western Kentucky | 84
Pepperdine | 61
Alaska Anchorage | 94

Championship; November 25
Western Kentucky | 62
Alaska Anchorage | 58
3rd Place game November 25
George Mason | 71
Pepperdine | 63
