= 2003–04 Clemson Tigers women's basketball team =

Women's college basketball season

2003–04 Clemson Tigers women's basketball

WNIT, First Round
- Conference: Atlantic Coast Conference
- Record: 17–12 (7–9 ACC)
- Head coach: Jim Davis (17th season)
- Home arena: Littlejohn Coliseum

The 2003–04 Clemson Tigers women's basketball team represented Clemson University during the 2003–04 NCAA Division I women's basketball season. The Tigers were led by seventeenth year head coach Jim Davis. The Tigers, members of the Atlantic Coast Conference, played their home games at Littlejohn Coliseum.

== Schedule ==
Date time, TV	Rank^{#}	Opponent^{#}	Result	Record	Site city, state
November 21, 2003*		South Carolina rivalry	W 103–99	1–0	Littlejohn Coliseum; Clemson, South Carolina
November 25, 2003*		vs. BYU; Great Alaska Shootout	W 62–56	2–0	Sullivan Arena; Anchorage, Alaska
November 26, 2003*		at Alaska Anchorage; Great Alaska Shootout	L 58–61	2–1	Sullivan Arena; Anchorage, Alaska
November 30, 2003*		No. 15 Rutgers	W 69–64	3–1	Littlejohn Coliseum; Clemson, South Carolina
December 4, 2003*		at Western Carolina	W 80–71	4–1	Ramsey Center; Cullowhee, North Carolina
December 7, 2003*		at Furman	W 74–66	5–1	Timmons Arena; Greenville, South Carolina
December 13, 2003*		Western Kentucky	W 87–75	6–1	Littlejohn Coliseum; Clemson, South Carolina
December 15, 2003*		East Tennessee State	W 82–45	7–1	Littlejohn Coliseum; Clemson, South Carolina
December 19, 2003*		at Youngstown State	W 79–75	8–1	Beeghly Center; Youngstown, Ohio
December 21, 2003*		at Pittsburgh	W 62–47	9–1	Petersen Events Center; Pittsburgh, Pennsylvania
December 29, 2003*		Coastal Carolina	W 84–65	10–1	Littlejohn Coliseum; Clemson, South Carolina
January 2, 2004		at Virginia	W 58–55	11–1 (1–0)	University Hall; Charlottesville, Virginia
January 4, 2004		at No. 14 North Carolina	L 47–72	11–2 (1–1)	Carmichael Arena; Chapel Hill, North Carolina
January 8, 2004		Florida State	L 61–68	11–3 (1–2)	Littlejohn Coliseum; Clemson, South Carolina
January 11, 2004		NC State	W 77–64	12–3 (2–2)	Littlejohn Coliseum; Clemson, South Carolina
January 18, 2004		at Georgia Tech	W 75–61	13–3 (3–2)	Alexander Memorial Coliseum; Atlanta, Georgia
January 21, 2004		Wake Forest	W 71–68	14–3 (4–2)	Littlejohn Coliseum; Clemson, South Carolina
January 25, 2004		Virginia	W 60–56	15–3 (5–2)	Littlejohn Coliseum; Clemson, South Carolina
January 29, 2004		at Maryland	L 55–68	15–4 (5–3)	Comcast Center; College Park, Maryland
February 2, 2004		No. 2 Duke	L 60–78	15–5 (5–4)	Littlejohn Coliseum; Clemson, South Carolina
February 5, 2004		No. 12 North Carolina	L 41–72	15–6 (5–5)	Littlejohn Coliseum; Clemson, South Carolina
February 8, 2004		at Florida State	L 50–65	15–7 (5–6)	Tallahassee–Leon County Civic Center; Tallahassee, Florida
February 12, 2004		at NC State	L 55–76	15–8 (5–7)	Reynolds Coliseum; Raleigh, North Carolina
February 19, 2004		Georgia Tech	W 59–47	16–8 (6–7)	Littlejohn Coliseum; Clemson, South Carolina
February 22, 2004		at Wake Forest	W 72–55	17–8 (7–7)	LJVM Coliseum; Winston-Salem, North Carolina
February 27, 2004		at No. 3 Duke	L 45–102	17–9 (7–8)	Cameron Indoor Stadium; Durham, North Carolina
February 29, 2004		Maryland	L 69–80	17–10 (7–9)	Littlejohn Coliseum; Clemson, South Carolina
ACC Tournament
March 6, 2004*		vs. NC State; ACC Tournament quarterfinal	L 43–45	17–11 (7–9)	Greensboro Coliseum; Greensboro, North Carolina
Women's National Invitation Tournament
March 17, 2004*		Charlotte; WNIT first round	L 71–78	17–12 (7–9)	Littlejohn Coliseum; Clemson, South Carolina
*Non-conference game. ^{#}Rankings from AP Poll. (#) Tournament seedings in parentheses.
