= 2004 Great Alaska Shootout =

American college basketball tournament

- Season: 2004–05
- Teams: 8 (men's), 4 (women's)
- Finals site: Sullivan Arena, Anchorage, Alaska
- Champions: Washington (men's); Stanford (women's)
- MVP: Nate Robinson, Washington (men's); Candice Wiggins, Stanford (women's)

The 2004 Great Alaska Shootout was held November 24, 2005, through November 27, 2004 at Sullivan Arena in Anchorage, Alaska

== Brackets ==
=== Men's ===
5th Place Game; November 27
Furman	50
Utah	62
7th Place Game
Alaska Anchorage	66
High Point	65

Consolation 2nd Round; November 26
Alaska Anchorage	71
Furman	81
Utah	78
High Point	69

First Round; November 24, 25
Alaska Anchorage	55
Alabama	90
Furman	69
Minnesota	84
Utah	71
Washington	78
High Point	65
Oklahoma	93

Semifinals; November 26
Alabama	70
Minnesota	73
Washington	96
Oklahoma	91

Championship; November 27
Alabama	76
Washington	79
3rd Place Game
Minnesota	54
Oklahoma	67

=== Women's ===
Semifinals; November 23
Alaska Anchorage	48
Louisiana–Lafayette	88
Eastern Washington	51
Stanford	90

Championship; November 24
Louisiana–Lafayette	47
Stanford	67
3rd Place game November 23
Alaska Anchorage	69
Eastern Washington	82
