= 2017 Great Alaska Shootout =

American college basketball tournament

- Season: 2017–18
- Teams: 8 (men's), 4 (women's)
- Finals site: Alaska Airlines Center, Anchorage, Alaska
- Champions: Central Michigan (men's); Alaska Anchorage (women's)
- MVP: Shelby Cloninger, Alaska Anchorage (women's)

The 2017 GCI Great Alaska Shootout was the 39th and last edition of the Great Alaska Shootout, an annual college basketball tournament that featured colleges from all over the United States. All games were played at the Alaska Airlines Center in Anchorage, Alaska. The event took place November 21 through November 25, 2017 with eight schools participating in the men's tournament and four in the women's tournament. The men's first round, semifinals, and championship game were televised on CBS Sports Network. Central Michigan won the men's tournament, defeating Cal State Bakersfield. In the women's tournament, Alaska Anchorage defeated Tulsa.

== Brackets ==
* – Denotes overtime period

=== Men's ===
5th Place Game; November 25
College of Charleston	55
Alaska Anchorage	46
7th Place Game
Sam Houston State	73
Santa Clara	59

Consolation 2nd Round; November 23
College of Charleston	59
Sam Houston State	49
Santa Clara	73
Alaska Anchorage	78*

First Round; November 22
Cal Poly	73
College of Charleston	68
Central Michigan	71
Sam Houston State	60
Idaho	69
Santa Clara	59
Cal State Bakersfield	59
Alaska Anchorage	39

Semifinals; November 24
Cal Poly	53
Central Michigan	56
Idaho	62
Cal State Bakersfield	64

Championship; November 25
Central Michigan	75
Cal State Bakersfield	72
3rd Place Game
Cal Poly	53
Idaho	75

=== Women's ===
First Round; November 21
Tulsa	60
Binghamton	55
Alaska Anchorage	69
Maryland Eastern Shore	59

Championship Game; November 23
Alaska Anchorage	59
Tulsa	53
3rd Place Game; November 23
Binghamton	68
Maryland Eastern Shore	51
