= 2006 Great Alaska Shootout =

American college basketball tournament

- Season: 2006–07
- Teams: 8 (men's), 4 (women's)
- Finals site: Sullivan Arena, Anchorage, Alaska
- Champions: California (men's); Alaska Anchorage (women's)
- MVP: Ryan Anderson, California (men's); Rebecca Kielpinski, Alaska Anchorage (women's)

The 2006 Great Alaska Shootout was held November 22, 2006, through November 24, 2006 at Sullivan Arena in Anchorage, Alaska

== Brackets ==
* – Denotes overtime period

=== Men's ===
5th Place Game; November 25
Hofstra	75
Alaska Anchorage	65
7th Place Game
UMKC	79
Marshall	75

Consolation 2nd Round; November 24
UMKC	75
Alaska Anchorage	79
Hofstra	73
Marshall	70

First Round; November 22, 23
Loyola Marymount	69
Alaska Anchorage	58
UMKC	70
Pacific	71
Hawaii	80
Hofstra	79
Marshall	70
California	72

Semifinals; November 25
Loyola Marymount	88
Pacific	85**
Hawai'i	72
California	56

Championship; November 25
Loyola Marymount	70
California	78
3rd Place Game
Pacific	71
Hawai'i	60

=== Women's ===
Semifinals; November 21
Air Force	60
Alaska Anchorage	62
Butler	53
UC Riverside	65

Championship; November 22
Alaska Anchorage	72
UC Riverside	67
3rd Place game November 22
Air Force	62
Butler	61
