= 2010 Fairbanks Grizzlies season =

Indoor Football League team season

- Owner: Chad Dittman; Ricky Bertz; Michael Taylor
- Head coach: Robert Fuller
- Home stadium: Carlson Center

Results
- Record: 9-5
- Division place: 2nd Pacific North
- Playoffs: Lost IC Wild Card 35-45 (Stampede Express)

The 2010 Fairbanks Grizzlies season was the team's third season as a professional indoor football franchise and second in the Indoor Football League (IFL). One of twenty-five teams that competed in the IFL for the 2010 season, the Fairbanks, Alaska-based Fairbanks Grizzlies were members of the Pacific North Division of the Intense Conference.

Under the leadership of owners Chad Dittman, Ricky Bertz, Michael Taylor and head coach Robert Fuller, the team played their home games at the Carlson Center in Fairbanks, Alaska.

== Schedule ==
Win Tie Loss Bye

=== Regular season ===
Week	Day	Date	Kickoff	Opponent	Results		Location
Week	Day	Date	Kickoff	Opponent	Final score	Team record	Location
1	Sunday	February 28	5:05pm	at Alaska Wild	W 29-28	1-0	Sullivan Arena
2	Monday	March 8	7:05pm	Tri-Cities Fever	W 69-67	2-0	Carlson Center
3	Friday	March 12	7:35pm	at Kent Predators	W 57-42	3-0	ShoWare Center
4	Saturday	March 20	7:00pm	Alaska Wild	L 36-53	3-1	Carlson Center
5	Bye						
6	Thursday	April 1	12:05pm	at Alaska Wild	W 31-30	4-1	Sullivan Arena
7	Saturday	April 10	7:05pm	at Tri-Cities Fever	L 39-44	4-2	Toyota Center
8	Bye						
9	Saturday	April 24	7:03pm	Alaska Wild	W 40-32	5-2	Carlson Center
10	Bye						
11	Saturday	May 8	7:05pm	at Billings Outlaws	L 24-46	5-3	Rimrock Auto Arena at MetraPark
12	Friday	May 14	7:30pm	at Kent Predators	L 26-42	5-4	ShoWare Center
13	Saturday	May 22	7:05pm	Billings Outlaws	W 55-54	6-4	Carlson Center
14	Saturday	May 29	7:05pm	at Tri-Cities Fever	L 21-50	6-5	Toyota Center
15	Saturday	June 5	7:05pm	La Crosse Spartans	W 64-36	7-5	Carlson Center
16	Saturday	June 12	7:05pm	Kent Predators	W 49-42	8-5	Carlson Center
17	Friday	June 18	7:05pm	Colorado Ice	W 42-33	9-5	Carlson Center

=== Playoffs ===
Round	Day	Date	Kickoff	Opponent	Results		Location
Round	Day	Date	Kickoff	Opponent	Final score	Team record	Location
Wild Card	Monday	June 28	7:05pm	at San Angelo Stampede Express	L 35-45	---	San Angelo Coliseum

== Standings ==
2010 Pacific North Division
	W	L	T	PCT	GB	DIV	PF	PA	STK
y-Billings Outlaws	12	2	0	0.857	---	9-1	740	521	W3
x-Fairbanks Grizzlies	9	5	0	0.643	3.0	7-5	582	599	W3
x-Tri-Cities Fever	7	7	0	0.500	5.0	7-6	670	646	L1
Kent Predators	5	9	0	0.357	7.0	5-8	555	678	W1
~~Alaska Wild~~	~~2~~	~~12~~	~~0~~	~~0.143~~	~~10.0~~	~~2-10~~	~~377~~	~~457~~	~~L11~~

== Roster ==
2010 Fairbanks Grizzlies roster
Quarterbacks: 8 Matt Bassuener; 19 Justin Rummell; Running backs: 29 Antwan Harris; 42 Denny Kimmel; Wide receivers: 3 Josh Crawford; 4 Lonnie Sanders; 1 Tony Taylor	Offensive linemen: 90 Baron Harrell; 91 Raphael Ieru; 55 Zach Lamphere; 79 Vaughn Lesuma; Defensive linemen: 9 Asi Faoa; 92 Richard Posey; 43 Mike Quinn; 17 Bert Whigham	Linebackers: 24 Bob Takeno; 52 Devin Robinson; Defensive backs: 2 Johnell Brown; 14 Antonio Dishman; 21 Noah Harris; 3 Daudi White; Kickers: 10 Carlos Ojeda	Injured reserve: Currently vacant; Exempt lst: Currently vacant; Practice squad: Currently vacant; Rookies in italics Roster updated June 28, 2010; 22 Active, 0 Inactive, 0 PS
