= DeVon =

DeVon is a given name.

People bearing it include:

- DeVon Hardin (born 1986), American professional basketball player
- DeVon Walker (born 1985), American former indoor football player

== See also ==
- Devon (given name)
- De'von Hall (born 1985), former American football player
