= 2010 Alaska Wild season =

Indoor Football League team season

- Owner: Charles Matthews (first 9 games); Indoor Football League (Interim)
- Head coach: Darnell Lee (resigned on May 13, 2-7 record); Carl Sundquist (Interim)
- Home stadium: Sullivan Arena; 1600 Gambell Street; Anchorage, AK 99501

Results
- Record: 2-12
- Division place: 5th Pacific North
- Playoffs: did not qualify

The 2010 Alaska Wild season was the team's fourth season as a professional indoor football franchise and second in the Indoor Football League (IFL). One of twenty-five teams competing in the IFL for the 2010 season, the Anchorage, Alaska-based Alaska Wild were members of the Pacific North Division of the Intense Conference.

Under the leadership of owner Charles Matthews and head coach Darnell Lee, the team played their home games at the Sullivan Arena in Anchorage, Alaska. Lee resigned from the Wild on May 13, and the team forfeited its remaining home games. The IFL assumed control of the team, and made sure that the Wild played their final road game commitment at the Tri-Cities Fever. The team would then fold following the end of the season.

== Schedule ==
Win Tie Loss Bye

=== Regular season ===
Week	Day	Date	Kickoff	Opponent	Results		Location
Week	Day	Date	Kickoff	Opponent	Final Score	Team Record	Location
1	Sunday	February 28	5:05pm	Fairbanks Grizzlies	L 28-29	0-1	Sullivan Arena
2	Monday	March 8	7:05pm	Kent Predators	W 48-39	1-1	Sullivan Arena
3	Bye						
4	Saturday	March 20	7:00pm	at Fairbanks Grizzlies	W 53-36	2-1	Carlson Center
5	Saturday	March 27	7:05pm	at Chicago Slaughter	L 33-34	2-2	Sears Centre
6	Thursday	April 1	12:05pm	Fairbanks Grizzlies	L 30-31	2-3	Sullivan Arena
7	Friday	April 9	7:30pm	at Kent Predators	L 54-59	2-4	ShoWare Center
8	Saturday	April 17	7:05pm	at Billings Outlaws	L 25-65	2-5	Rimrock Auto Arena at MetraPark
9	Saturday	April 24	7:03pm	at Fairbanks Grizzlies	L 32-40	2-6	Carlson Center
10	Saturday	May 1	7:05pm	at Tri-Cities Fever	L 48-56	2-7	Toyota Center
11	Bye						
12	Sunday	May 16	7:05pm	Billings Outlaws	L 0-1 (forfeit)	2-8	Sullivan Arena
13	Sunday	May 23	5:05pm	Tri-Cities Fever	L 0-1 (forfeit)	2-9	Sullivan Arena
14	Sunday	May 30	5:05pm	La Crosse Spartans	L 0-1 (forfeit)	2-10	Sullivan Arena
15	Bye						
16	Saturday	June 12	7:05pm	at Tri-Cities Fever	L 26-64	2-11	Toyota Center
17	Saturday	June 19	7:05pm	Kent Predators	L 0-1 (forfeit)	2-12	Sullivan Arena

== Standings ==
2010 Pacific North Division
	W	L	T	PCT	GB	DIV	PF	PA	STK
y-Billings Outlaws	12	2	0	0.857	---	9-1	740	521	W3
x-Fairbanks Grizzlies	9	5	0	0.643	3.0	7-5	582	599	W3
x-Tri-Cities Fever	7	7	0	0.500	5.0	7-6	670	646	L1
Kent Predators	5	9	0	0.357	7.0	5-8	555	678	W1
~~Alaska Wild~~	~~2~~	~~12~~	~~0~~	~~0.143~~	~~10.0~~	~~2-10~~	~~377~~	~~457~~	~~L11~~

== Roster ==
2010 Alaska Wild roster
Quarterbacks: 1 James Phillips; 18 Jorge Vasquez; Running backs: 20 Brandon Tate; Wide receivers: 31 John Curtis; 45 Craig Hobroski; 86 Mike Waller	Offensive linemen: 77 Tui Alailefaeula; Defensive linemen: 57 Chad Havercamp; 92 Mitchell Johnson; 75 Russell Knight; 63 Clark Pauls	Linebackers: 49 Rod Gagnon; 68 Gary Reynolds; Defensive backs: 4 Jemeel Brady; 42 Andre Cummings; 25 Ryan Reynolds; 12 Phillip Thomas; Kickers Larry Stovall-Moody	Injured Reserve: currently vacant; Exempt List: currently vacant; Practice squad: currently vacant; rookies in italics Roster updated June 12, 2010; 17 Active, 0 Inactive, 0 PS → More rosters
