= 2010 Billings Outlaws season =

Indoor Football League team season

- Owner: Mike Parnell
- General manager: Adam Steadman
- Head coach: Heron O'Neal
- Home stadium: Rimrock Auto Arena at MetraPark; 308 6th Avenue North; Billings Montana 59101

Results
- Record: 12-2
- Division place: 1st Pacific North
- Playoffs: Won IC Quarterfinals 54-45 (Fever); Won IC Semifinals 68-39 (Stampede Express); Won IC Championship 53-42 (Diamonds); Won United Bowl 43-34 (Storm)

The 2010 Billings Outlaws season was the team's eleventh and final season as a professional indoor football franchise and second in the Indoor Football League (IFL). One of twenty-five teams competing in the IFL for the 2010 season, the Billings, Montana-based Billings Outlaws were members of the Pacific North Division of the Intense Conference.

Under the leadership of head coach Heron O'Neal, the team played their home games at the Rimrock Auto Arena at MetraPark in Billings, Montana.

On October 7, 2010 the Outlaws announced they would cease operations due to not having enough money for the 2011 season, this was in large part due to a disagreement with county commissioners over funding non-insured losses suffered during the 2010 tornado that severely damaged the Rimrock Auto Arena.

== Schedule ==
Win Tie Loss Bye

=== Regular season ===
Week	Day	Date	Kickoff	Opponent	Results		Location	Attendance
Week	Day	Date	Kickoff	Opponent	Final Score	Team record	Location	Attendance
1	Sunday	February 28	4:00pm	Kent Predators	W 56-40	1-0	Rimrock Auto Arena at MetraPark	3,386
2	Friday	March 5	7:15pm	at Colorado Ice	W 47-39	2-0	Budweiser Events Center	
3	Saturday	March 14	4:00pm	Tri-Cities Fever	W 64-50	3-0	Rimrock Auto Arena at MetraPark	3,039
4	Monday	March 22	7:05pm	at Sioux Falls Storm	L 31-37	3-1	Sioux Falls Arena	
5	Bye							
6	Bye							
7	Sunday	April 11	4:05pm	Colorado Ice	W 71-41	4-1	Rimrock Auto Arena at MetraPark	2,683
8	Saturday	April 17	7:05pm	Alaska Wild	W 65-25	5-1	Rimrock Auto Arena at MetraPark	4,018
9	Saturday	April 24	7:05pm	at Tri-Cities Fever	W 70-47	6-1	Toyota Center	
10	Friday	April 30	7:30pm	at Kent Predators	W 54-30	7-1	ShoWare Center	
11	Saturday	May 8	7:05pm	Fairbanks Grizzlies	W 46-24	8-1	Rimrock Auto Arena at MetraPark	3,924
12	Sunday	May 16	7:05pm	at Alaska Wild	W 1-0 (forfeit)	9-1	Sullivan Arena	
13	Saturday	May 22	5:05pm	at Fairbanks Grizzlies	L 24-46	9-2	Carlson Center	
14	Saturday	May 29	7:05pm	at Kent Predators	W 53-47	10-2	ShoWare Center	
15	Bye							
16	Saturday	June 12	7:05pm	Sioux Falls Storm	W 60-40	11-2	Rimrock Auto Arena at MetraPark	4,827
17	Saturday	June 19	7:05pm	Tri-Cities Fever	W 68-40	12-2	Rimrock Auto Arena at MetraPark	3,783

=== Playoffs ===
Round	Day	Date	Kickoff	Opponent	Results		Location	Attendance
Round	Day	Date	Kickoff	Opponent	Final Score	Team record	Location	Attendance
IC Quarterfinals	Sunday	June 27	3:05pm	Tri-Cities Fever	W 54-45	---	Billings Sports Plex	800
IC Semifinals	Saturday	July 3	2:00pm	San Angelo Stampede Express	W 68-39	---	Billings Sports Plex	1,500
IC Championship	Saturday	July 10	7:00pm	Arkansas Diamonds	W 53-42	---	Billings Sports Plex	
United Bowl	Saturday	July 17	7:00pm	Sioux Falls Storm	W 43-34	---	Billings Sports Plex	2,500

== Standings ==
2010 Pacific North Division
	W	L	T	PCT	GB	DIV	PF	PA	STK
y-Billings Outlaws	12	2	0	0.857	---	9-1	740	521	W3
x-Fairbanks Grizzlies	9	5	0	0.643	3.0	7-5	582	599	W3
x-Tri-Cities Fever	7	7	0	0.500	5.0	7-6	670	646	L1
Kent Predators	5	9	0	0.357	7.0	5-8	555	678	W1
~~Alaska Wild~~	~~2~~	~~12~~	~~0~~	~~0.143~~	~~10.0~~	~~2-10~~	~~377~~	~~457~~	~~L11~~

== Roster ==
2010 Billings Outlaws roster
Quarterbacks: 5 Chris Dixon; Running backs: 22 Timothy Brown; 27 Eddie Linscomb; Wide receivers: 11 Antuan Bloom; 9 Travis Browne; 4 Carl Sims; 6 James Walton	Offensive linemen: 50 Gerald Davis; 65 Charlie Sanders; 75 Myniya Smith; Defensive linemen: 15 Michael Bazemore; 34 Tyrell Herndon; 92 Jervonte Jackson; 53 Kelly Rouse; 99 Chris Turner	Linebackers: 37 Anthony Degrate; Defensive backs: 19 Michael Eby; 1 Jovan Jackson; 3 Travonti Johnson; 7 Muhammad Shamsid-Deen; 2 Kadafi Tunsil; Kickers: 23 Garret Palmer	Injured reserve: Currently vacant; Exempt list: Currently vacant; Practice squad: Currently vacant; Rookies in italics Roster updated June 19, 2010; 24 Active, 0 Inactive, 0 PS

== 2010 player awards ==
Week 1: Defensive Player of the Week
Mike Bazemore (4 sacks)
Week 3: Offensive Player of the Week
James Walton (8 catches, 118 yards, 3 tds)
Week 7: Offensive Player of the Week
Chris Dixon (22-32 passing for 217 yds, 8 tds, 9 carries for 58 yards)
Round 1: Offensive Player of the Week
Chris Dixon (15-20 passing for 162 yards, 5tds, 18 carries for 134 yards, 1 td)
Round 2: Special Teams Player of the Week
Tim Brown (4 returns, 111 yards, 1 td, 11 carries, 68 yards, 1 td, 4 catches, 61 yards, 1 td)
Round 3: Offensive Player of the Week
Chris Dixon (19 of 25 passing for 191 yards, 8 tds)
Round 3: Defensive Player of the Week
Jovan Jackson (2 interceptions, 2 pass break-ups, 2.5 tackles)
United Bowl: Offensive Player of the Week
Chris Dixon (17 of 25 passing for 153 yards, 2 tds, 13 carries, 50 yards, 2 tds)
United Bowl: Defensive Player of the Week
Tyrell Herndon (5.5 tackles, 2.5 for loss, 1 sack, 1 forced fumble)
United Bowl: Special Teams Player of the Week
Tim Brown (2 returns, 62 yards, 1 td, 6 carries, 14 yards, 1 td, 8 catches, 47 yards, 1 td)
