= 2010 Tri-Cities Fever season =

Indoor Football League team season

- Owner: Teri Carr
- General manager: Teri Carr
- Head coach: Adam Shackleford
- Home stadium: Toyota Center

Results
- Record: 7–7
- Division place: 3rd Pacific
- Conference place: 6th Intense
- Playoffs: Lost First round 45–54 (Outlaws)

The 2010 Tri-Cities Fever season was the team's sixth season as a professional indoor football franchise and first in the Indoor Football League (IFL). One of twenty-five teams competing in the IFL for the 2010 season, the Kennewick, Washington-based Tri-Cities Fever were members of the Pacific Division of the Intense Conference.

Under the leadership of head coach Adam Shackleford, the team played their home games at the Toyota Center in Kennewick, Washington.

The Fever lost to the Billings Outlaws 45–54 in the 2010 First Round.

== Schedule ==
Win Tie Loss Bye

=== Regular season ===
Week	Day	Date	Kickoff	Opponent	Results		Location
Week	Day	Date	Kickoff	Opponent	Final score	Team record	Location
1	Bye						
2	Monday	March 8	7:05pm	at Fairbanks Grizzlies	L 67–69	0–1	Carlson Center
3	Saturday	March 14	4:00pm	at Billings Outlaws	L 50–64	0–2	Rimrock Auto Arena at MetraPark
4	Bye						
5	Saturday	March 27	7:05pm	Kent Predators	L 49–55	0–3	Toyota Center
6	Bye						
7	Saturday	April 10	7:05pm	Fairbanks Grizzlies	W 44–39	1–3	Toyota Center
8	Sunday	April 18	3:05pm	at Kent Predators	L 10–23	1–4	ShoWare Center
9	Saturday	April 24	7:05pm	Billings Outlaws	L 47–70	1–5	Toyota Center
10	Saturday	May 1	7:05pm	Alaska Wild	W 56–48	2–5	Toyota Center
11	Saturday	May 8	7:05pm	Kent Predators	W 71–24	3–5	Toyota Center
12	Saturday	May 15	7:00pm	at Colorado Ice	L 41–57	3–6	Budweiser Events Center
13	Sunday	May 23	5:05pm	at Alaska Wild	W 1–0 (forfeit)	4–6	Sullivan Arena
14	Saturday	May 29	7:05pm	Fairbanks Grizzlies	W 39–37	5–6	Toyota Center
15	Friday	June 4	7:05pm	at Kent Predators	W 54–36	6–6	ShoWare Center
16	Saturday	June 12	7:05pm	Alaska Wild	W 64–26	7–6	Toyota Center
17	Saturday	June 19	7:05pm	at Billings Outlaws	L 40–68	7–7	Rimrock Auto Arena at MetraPark

=== Playoffs ===
Round	Day	Date	Kickoff	Opponent	Results		Location
Round	Day	Date	Kickoff	Opponent	Final score	Team record	Location
Wild Card	Sunday	June 27	3:05pm	at Billings Outlaws	L 45–54	---	Rimrock Auto Arena at MetraPark

== Standings ==
2010 Pacific North Division
	W	L	T	PCT	GB	DIV	PF	PA	STK
y-Billings Outlaws	12	2	0	0.857	---	9-1	740	521	W3
x-Fairbanks Grizzlies	9	5	0	0.643	3.0	7-5	582	599	W3
x-Tri-Cities Fever	7	7	0	0.500	5.0	7-6	670	646	L1
Kent Predators	5	9	0	0.357	7.0	5-8	555	678	W1
~~Alaska Wild~~	~~2~~	~~12~~	~~0~~	~~0.143~~	~~10.0~~	~~2-10~~	~~377~~	~~457~~	~~L11~~

== Roster ==
2010 Tri-Cities Fever roster
Quarterbacks: 8 Andrew Carcich; 5 Houston Lillard; Running backs: 29 Tyson Thompson; Wide receivers: 4 Brandon Copeland; 7 Joey Hew Len; 6 Thyron Lewis; 23 Ray Little; 1 Courtney Singleton; 9 Johnny Walker	Offensive linemen: 62 Kenny Ackermann; 57 Donald Fondren; 95 Dave Howell; Defensive linemen: 69 Blair Boynton; 11 Ameer Ismail; 96 Fred Poole; 55 Curtis Terry	Linebackers: 76 Jason Donnal; 40 Cyrus Mulitalo; Defensive backs: 10 Carldayle Brantley; 3 Dwain Crawford; 19 Montavis Pitts; 13 Jo Artis Ratti; 2 Lionell Singleton; Kickers: 44 Brett Jaekle	Injured Reserve: currently vacant; Exempt List: currently vacant; Practice squad: currently vacant; rookies in italics Roster updated June 19, 2010; 24 Active, 0 Inactive, 0 PS → More rosters
