= Great Alaska Shootout =

Annual college basketball tournament in Anchorage

- Sport: Men's & women's college basketball
- Founded: 1978; 2022 (as women's-only tournament)
- Folded: 2017 (men)
- No. of teams: 4 (women's)
- Country: United States
- Venues: Alaska Airlines Center, Anchorage, Alaska
- Website: goseawolves.com

The Great Alaska Shootout is an annual women's college basketball tournament in Anchorage, Alaska that features host University of Alaska Anchorage and three visiting NCAA Division I teams. The four-team tournament resumed in 2022 following a four-year layoff. The women's Shootout was started in 1980 and ran through 1997 as the Northern Lights Invitational, featuring either four- or eight-team fields and playing at the UAA Sports Center. Following a one-year absence, the tournament was renamed and run along with the men's Great Alaska Shootout every Thanksgiving week from 1999 to 2017. The tournament was held at Sullivan Arena from 1999 to 2013 and moved to the Alaska Airlines Center in 2014.

In 2022, the four-team women's tournament was reborn with co-sponsorship by Arctic Slope Regional Corporation and ConocoPhillips Alaska.

== Men's history ==
The University of Alaska Anchorage (UAA) hosted the tournament every Thanksgiving from 1978 to 2017. Tournament games were played at the Alaska Airlines Center, a new arena on the UAA campus, from 2014 to 2017. Prior to that, games were played at the Sullivan Arena in Anchorage from 1983 to 2013 and at Buckner Field House on Fort Richardson from 1978 to 1982. The men's tournament included eight teams (with the exception of a six-team field in 2009).

The tournament was one of the longest-running tournaments in college basketball history, lasting for 40 years, and brought the highest level of collegiate basketball to Alaska. The Shootout was held Thanksgiving weekend.

Under National Collegiate Athletic Association (NCAA) rules, teams are normally limited to approximately 28 regular-season games. However, games in "exempted events," traditionally played early in the season, are not counted against that limit. The most recent policy from the NCAA in this regard allows all teams to play in one exempted event per season. Those teams who choose to take advantage of that opportunity may play up to thirty-one games per season, including games played in those exempted events but excluding postseason tournament games. A previous version of the rule allowed for all games played outside the United States mainland to be exempt from the then-27-game limit. This version was partly responsible for the genesis of tournaments such as Great Alaska Shootout.

The Great Alaska Shootout began in 1978 as the brainchild of former UAA men's basketball coach Bob Rachal. Raycom Sports first picked up the broadcast rights to the tournament in 1979, and ESPN began broadcasting it in 1985.

On August 26, 2017, it was announced that the 2017 men's Shootout would be the last. The University of Alaska Anchorage stopped funding it as newer tournaments were drawing away top teams to warmer locations.

== Past champions, runners-up and MVPs ==
=== Men's tournament ===
The following table indicates the winners, runners-up and tournament most valuable players (MVPs).

Year	Winner	Score	Opponent	Tournament MVP
1978	North Carolina State	72–66	Louisville	Clyde Austin, NC State
1979	Kentucky	57–50	Iona	Jeff Ruland, Iona
1980	North Carolina	64–58	Arkansas	Scott Hastings, Arkansas
1981	Southwestern Louisiana	81–64	Marquette	Steve Burtt, Iona
1982	Louisville	80–70	Vanderbilt	Lancaster Gordon, Louisville
1983	North Carolina State	65–60	Arkansas	Joe Kleine, Arkansas
1984	UAB	50–46	Kansas	Steve Mitchell, UAB
1985	North Carolina	65–60	UNLV	Brad Daugherty, North Carolina
1986	Iowa	103–80	Northeastern	Roy Marble, Iowa
1987	Arizona	80–69	Syracuse	Sean Elliott, Arizona
1988	Seton Hall	92–81	Kansas	Chris Mills, Kentucky
1989	Michigan State	73–68	Kansas State	Steve Smith, Michigan State
1990	UCLA	89–74	Virginia	Don MacLean, UCLA
1991	Massachusetts	68–56	New Orleans	Jim McCoy, Massachusetts
1992	New Mexico State	95–94	Illinois	Sam Crawford, New Mexico State
1993	Purdue	88–73	Portland	Glenn Robinson, Purdue
1994	Minnesota	79–74	BYU	Townsend Orr, Minnesota
1995	Duke	88–81	Iowa	Ray Allen, Connecticut
1996	Kentucky	92–65	College of Charleston	Ron Mercer, Kentucky
1997	North Carolina	73–69	Purdue	Antawn Jamison, North Carolina
1998	Cincinnati	77–75	Duke	William Avery, Duke
1999	Kansas	84–70	Georgia Tech	Drew Gooden, Kansas
2000	Syracuse	84–62	Missouri	Preston Shumpert, Syracuse
2001	Marquette	72–63	Gonzaga	Dwyane Wade, Marquette
2002	College of Charleston	71–69	Villanova	Troy Wheless, College of Charleston
2003	Purdue	78–68	Duke	Kenneth Lowe, Purdue
2004	Washington	79–76	Alabama	Nate Robinson, Washington
2005	Marquette	92–89 (OT)	South Carolina	Steve Novak, Marquette
2006	California	78–70	Loyola Marymount	Ryan Anderson, California
2007	Butler	81–71	Texas Tech	Mike Green, Butler
2008	San Diego State	76–47	Hampton	Kyle Spain, San Diego State
2009	Washington State	93–56	San Diego	Klay Thompson, Washington State
2010	St. John's	67–58	Arizona State	Justin Brownlee, St. John's
2011	Murray State	90–81 (2OT)	Southern Mississippi	Isaiah Canaan, Murray State
2012	Charlotte	67–59	Northeastern	Pierria Henry, Charlotte
2013	Harvard	71–50	TCU	Wesley Saunders, Harvard
2014	Colorado State	65–63	UC Santa Barbara	Alan Williams, UC Santa Barbara
2015	Middle Tennessee	78–70	Toledo	Nathan Boothe, Toledo
2016	Iona	75–73	Nevada	Sam Cassell Jr, Iona
2017	Central Michigan	75–72	Cal State Bakersfield	Shawn Roundtree, Central Michigan

=== Women's tournament ===
The following table indicates the winners, runners up and tournament MVPs.

Year	Winner	Score	Opponent	Tournament MVP
1980	Iowa	73–52	Alaska Anchorage	Cindy Haugejorde, Iowa
1981	San Diego State	50–41	Houston	Diena Pels, San Diego State
1982	Minnesota	70–66	Indiana	Laura Coenen, Minnesota
1983	Old Dominion	76–53	Wichita State	Lorri Bauman, Drake
1984	Texas	82–60	UNLV	Annette Smith, Texas
1985	Louisiana Tech	88–69	Penn State	Dawn Royster, North Carolina
1986	Northeast Louisiana	70–68	USC	Lisa Ingram, Northeast Louisiana
1987	New Orleans	84–61	Memphis State	Kunshinge Sorrell, Mississippi State
1988	South Carolina	98–97 (OT)	UNLV	Martha Parker, South Carolina
1989	Stephen F. Austin	96–81	Old Dominion	Connie Cole, Stephen F. Austin
1990	Alaska Anchorage	88–87	South Alabama	Diane Dobrich, Alaska Anchorage
1991	Northern Illinois	63–60	Louisville	Lisa Foss, Northern Illinois
1992	Penn State	83–62	Missouri-Kansas City	Susan Robinson, Penn State
1993	Hawai'i	N/A^{1}	SMU	Valerie Agee, Hawai'i
1994^{2}	Rhode Island	N/A^{1}	Northeast Louisiana	Dayna Smith, Rhode Island
1994^{2}	Clemson	79–62	UCLA	Tara Saunooke, Clemson
1995	South Carolina	83–71	Arizona State	Shannon Johnson, South Carolina
1996	Georgia	72–55	Oregon	Tracy Henderson, Georgia
1997	Tennessee	87–66	Wisconsin	Chamique Holdsclaw, Tennessee
1998	No tournament			
1999	Kansas	78–68	Louisville	Lynn Pride, Kansas
2000	Ohio State	95–60	Rhode Island	Jaime Lewis, Ohio State
2001	Iowa	90–73	Gonzaga	Lindsey Meder, Iowa
2002	Nevada	68–56	Indiana	Laura Ingham, Nevada
2003	Alaska Anchorage	61–58	Clemson	Kamie Jo Massey, Alaska Anchorage
2004	Stanford	67–47	Louisiana-Lafayette	Candice Wiggins, Stanford
2005	Central Connecticut State	69–65 (OT)	Arizona	Gabriella Guegbelet, Central Connecticut State
2006	Alaska Anchorage	78–70	UC Riverside	Rebecca Kielpinski, Alaska Anchorage
2007	Alaska Anchorage	52–50	Santa Clara	Rebecca Kielpinski, Alaska Anchorage
2008	Alaska Anchorage	58–57	Syracuse	Rebecca Kielpinski, Alaska Anchorage
2009	Alaska Anchorage	49–48	Cincinnati	Nicci Miller, Alaska Anchorage
2010	Kent State	53–47	Alaska Anchorage	Jamilah Humes, Kent State
2011	Miami	92–72	South Florida	Shenise Johnson, Miami
2012	Utah State	67–57	Alaska Anchorage	Devyn Christensen, Utah State
2013	Georgetown	92–78	Alaska Anchorage	Andrea White, Georgetown
2014	Long Beach State	69–60	Alaska Anchorage	Megan Mullings, Alaska Anchorage
2015	Western Kentucky	62–58	Alaska Anchorage	Kendall Noble, Western Kentucky
2016	USC	67–54	Portland	Kristen Simon, USC
2017	Alaska Anchorage	59–53	Tulsa	Shelby Cloninger, Alaska Anchorage
2018	Not held			
2019	Not held			
2020	Not held			
2021	Not held			
2022	Alaska Anchorage	88–75	La Salle	Vishe' Rabb, Alaska Anchorage
2023	Utah	117–72	Eastern Kentucky	Alissa Pili, Utah
2024	Troy	86–69	North Dakota State	Shaulana Wagner, Troy
2025	UC Irvine	63–55	St. Thomas	Jada Wynn, UC Irvine

^{1}Tournament was played in a round robin format.
^{2}The tournament was moved to earlier in the season beginning in the 1994–95 season; hence the first 1994 tournament corresponds to the 1993–94 season and the second tournament to the 1994–95 season.
