= Troy Wheless =

American former basketball player (born 1980)

Personal information
- Born: December 19, 1980 (age 45)
- Listed height: 6 ft 3 in (1.91 m)
- Listed weight: 175 lb (79 kg)

Career information
- High school: Bunn (Bunn, North Carolina)
- College: College of Charleston (1999–2003)
- NBA draft: 2003: undrafted
- Position: Shooting guard

Career history

Coaching
- 2004–2005: College of Charleston (DBO)
- 2005–2006?: College of Charleston (assistant)

Career highlights
- AP Honorable Mention All-American (2003); SoCon Player of the Year (2003); First-team All-SoCon (2003)

Troy Wheless (born December 19, 1980) is an American former basketball player known for his collegiate career at the College of Charleston (CofC) between 1999–2000 and 2002–03. During his four-year career with the Cougars, the school won four Southern Conference (SoCon) South Division championships and advanced to the National Invitation Tournament in 2003. Wheless scored 1,108 points in 116 career games. During Wheless' career, CofC recorded an overall record of 92 wins to just 30 losses. As a senior, Wheless began the season by leading the Cougars to win the Great Alaska Shootout and was named its most valuable player. For the year, he averaged 15.2 points, 3.3 rebounds, 2.3 assists and 1.6 steals per game en route to being named the SoCon Player of the Year as well as an Associated Press Honorable Mention All-American.

After earning a degree in Corporate Communications in 2003, Wheless "struggled to find a career path," according to a June 2005 article in The Post and Courier. Professional basketball overseas did not work out and he began to work in marketing until CofC coach Tom Herrion called to offer him a position as the Director of Basketball Operations. He spent one season in this position until he was promoted to be a full-time assistant coach at the start of the 2005–06 season. He lasted one season. Today he lives in North Carolina and has two children.
