= DeVon Walker =

American football player (born 1985)

No. 8
- Position: Defensive specialist

Personal information
- Born: November 22, 1985 (age 40); Compton, California, U.S.
- Listed height: 6 ft 0 in (1.83 m)
- Listed weight: 188 lb (85 kg)

Career information
- High school: Gahr (Cerritos, California)
- College: Nevada
- NFL draft: 2008: undrafted

Career history
- Baltimore Ravens (2008)*; San Jose SaberCats (2008)*; Tri-Cities Fever (2008–2010); Kent Predators (2010)
- * Offseason or practice squad member only

DeVon Walker (born November 22, 1985) is a former indoor football defensive specialist who last played Kent Predators of the Indoor Football League (IFL). He played college football at Nevada.

== Early life ==
Walker attended Gahr High School. While there, he lettered three times in football on offense and defense. Also during the season he was named defensive player-of-the-week three times and achieved the defensive MVP award.

In 2005, Walker, a two-star cornerback recruit began receiving offers from Division I-A schools such as: Nevada, Idaho, San Diego State, TCU, Tulsa, and Washington State. He began favoring San Diego State; however, he later chose to commit to Nevada.

== College career ==
After his sophomore season, Walker was being recruited by multiple Division I-A schools. However, midway through the school year, Walker transferred to Nevada, where he played for his final two college seasons. In 2006, in 10 games, he recorded 18 tackles, two passes broken up, and one forced fumble. Then as a senior, in 2007, in 13 games, with 13 starts, he recorded 85 tackles, 3 interceptions, and eighteen passes broken up. While at Nevada he was also a communications major with a minors in business and music.

== Professional career ==
Measureables
Ht.	Wt.	40 yd.	20 Shut.	Squat Max.	Vertical Jump	Bench Max.	Broad Jump
6'0"	188 lb.	4.42	4.01	610 lbs.	39"	320 lbs.	10'9"

Walker went unselected in the 2008 NFL draft and was picked up by the Baltimore Ravens as a free agent; however, he failed to make it past training camp. Soon after Walker had several workouts with teams in the Canadian Football League, but failed to make a team as a starter. He then spent the last three weeks of the 2008 Arena Football League season with the San Jose SaberCats. He was then assigned to the Tri-Cities Fever on October 6, 2008. Walker re-signed with the Tri-Cities Fever in 2010. He was the first player to be signed for the new Arena Football 1 Fever team.

== Personal life ==
Walker is the son of Lee Walker, a well-known football coach in Long Beach, California, and Jacqueline Harris, a nurse. He is a personal trainer at Starfit Fitness Club, as well as the general manager. He is now the owner of Limitless Sports Academy. He has six children: Amoni Walker, Dillon Walker, Mia Walker, Axton Walker, Adiyah Walker, and Aiden Walker.
