= Alaska Airlines Center =

Multi-purpose arena in Anchorage, Alaska

- AAC
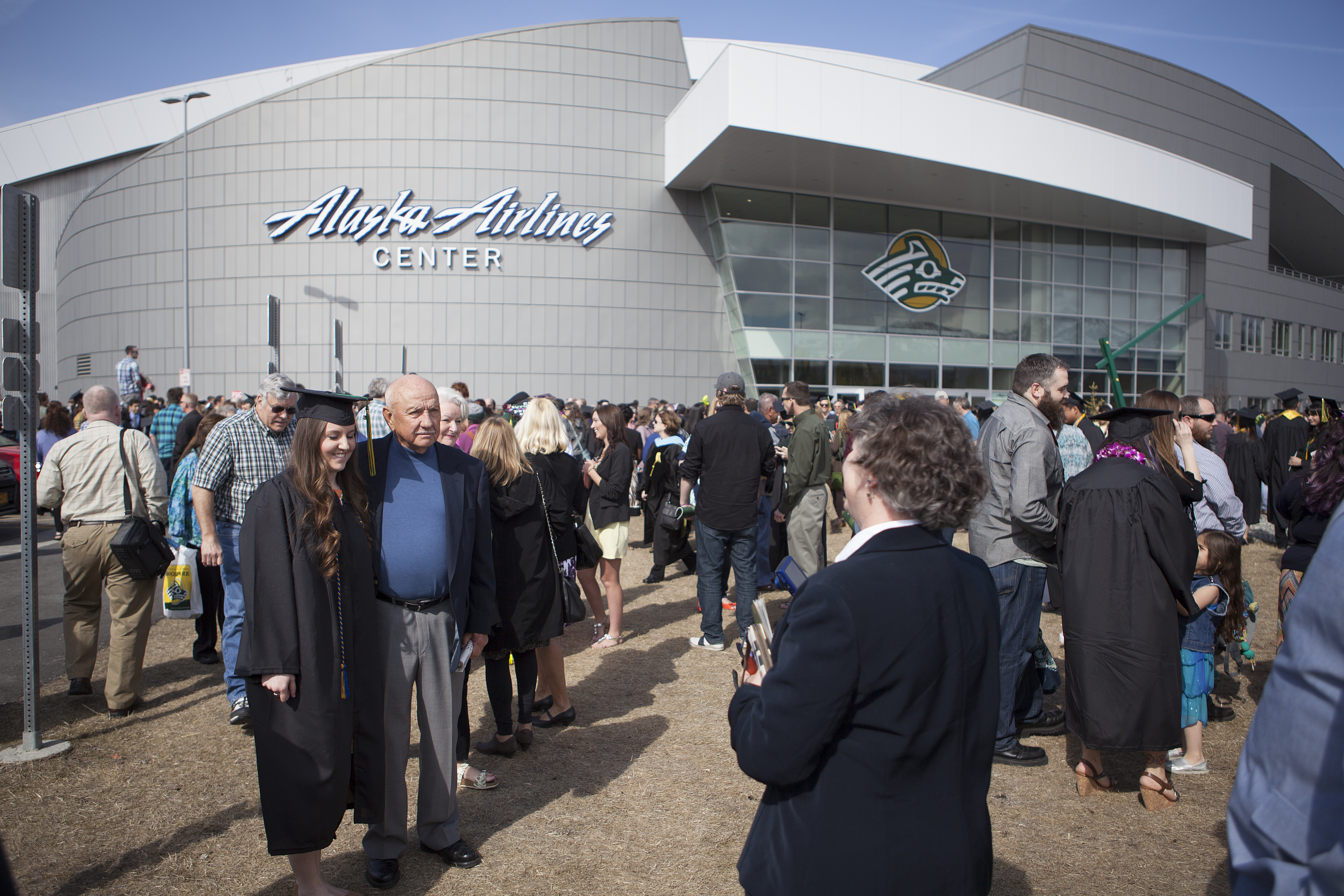

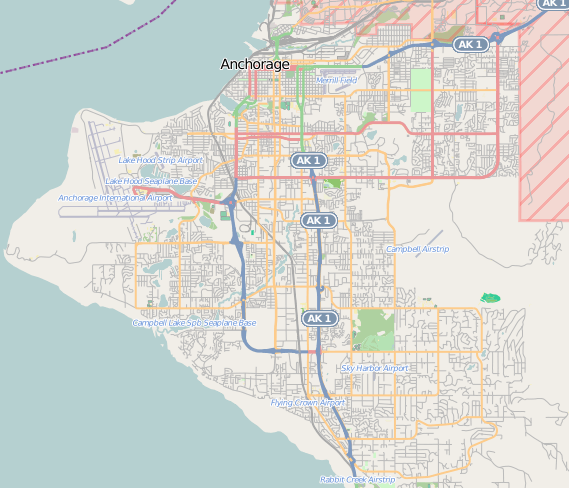
- Location within Anchorage Location within Alaska
- Former names: UAA Community Arena; Seawolf Arena; Seawolf Sports Arena
- Address: 3550 Providence Dr; Anchorage; USA
- Location: Anchorage, Alaska, United States
- Coordinates: 61°11′17″N 149°48′44″W
- Owner: University of Alaska Anchorage
- Operator: University of Alaska Anchorage
- Capacity: 5,000
- Scoreboard: Yes

Construction
- Groundbreaking: 2012
- Opened: Sept 2014
- Cost: $109 million

Tenants
- Alaska Anchorage Seawolves (all sports except ice hockey)

Website
- https://www.uaa.alaska.edu/about/administrative-services/departments/business-services/alaska-airlines-center.cshtml

The Alaska Airlines Center is a 5,000-seat multi-purpose arena in Anchorage, Alaska. It is located on the campus of the University of Alaska Anchorage (UAA) and adjacent to Providence Alaska Medical Center (PAMC).

== History ==
The arena went through several preliminary names, such as the UAA Community Arena, Seawolf Arena and Seawolf Sports Arena, before a naming rights and sponsorship deal was announced between UAA and Alaska Airlines on March 21, 2013. The arena held its grand opening on September 5, 2014.

The arena replaces the Wells Fargo Sports Complex as the home of UAA's athletic department and programs, including UAA Seawolves basketball and volleyball teams. The Sports Complex was built in 1978, at a time when Anchorage Community College predominated the campus; UAA had come into existence only a few years prior during a system reorganization, replacing Anchorage Senior College. Athletic officials at UAA had long complained of the inadequacies of the facility. After making preliminary plans, they set about serious lobbying efforts to secure funds to replace the structure starting in 2007.

Then-Alaska governor Sarah Palin vetoed $1 million for planning of the structure from the fiscal year (FY) 2008 capital budget. Shortly thereafter, Fran Ulmer was appointed chancellor of UAA, and began to intensively champion the arena. Financing came together as a result of the efforts led by Ulmer and other UAA officials, legislators Kevin Meyer and Bill Stoltze, and Anchorage businessmen Don Winchester and Steve Nerland. In 2008, a Title IX lawsuit was filed against UAA over inequitable facilities for the women's athletic teams at the Wells Fargo Sports Complex, which heightened efforts to replace that structure. In 2009, the University of Alaska Board of Regents approved a smaller, $80 million arena, before approving the current arena at their meeting in Fairbanks on June 3, 2011. $15 million was allocated in the FY 2009 capital budget, with an additional $60 million coming from the approval of bonds by Alaska voters in 2010. The remaining $34 million came from the FY 2012 capital budget signed by governor Sean Parnell, which also included $2 million for team recruiting efforts for the Great Alaska Shootout. Design of the arena commenced in 2011, shortly after the regents' vote. Groundwork and construction occurred throughout 2012.

The arena and PAMC share parking, as parking on the UAA campus north of Providence Drive is limited. The school's ice hockey team continues to play at the Sullivan Arena, as plans for this arena did not include an ice rink. The Wells Fargo Sports Complex will continue to house the Seawolves' practice rink, along with expanded hockey offices. UAA officials are considering the future construction of a separate ice hockey arena. The arena is also expected to attract non-UAA tenants, some of whom currently rent the Sullivan to hold their events.

== 2018 earthquake ==
On November 30, 2018, the center suffered minor damage caused by the 7.0 earthquake that day. The gymnasium flooded due to broken fire sprinklers, and several trophy cases had broken glass panels. There were no injuries at the facility.
