= Sullivan Arena =

Arena in Alaska, United States

Coordinates: 61°12′20″N 149°52′21″W

- The Sully
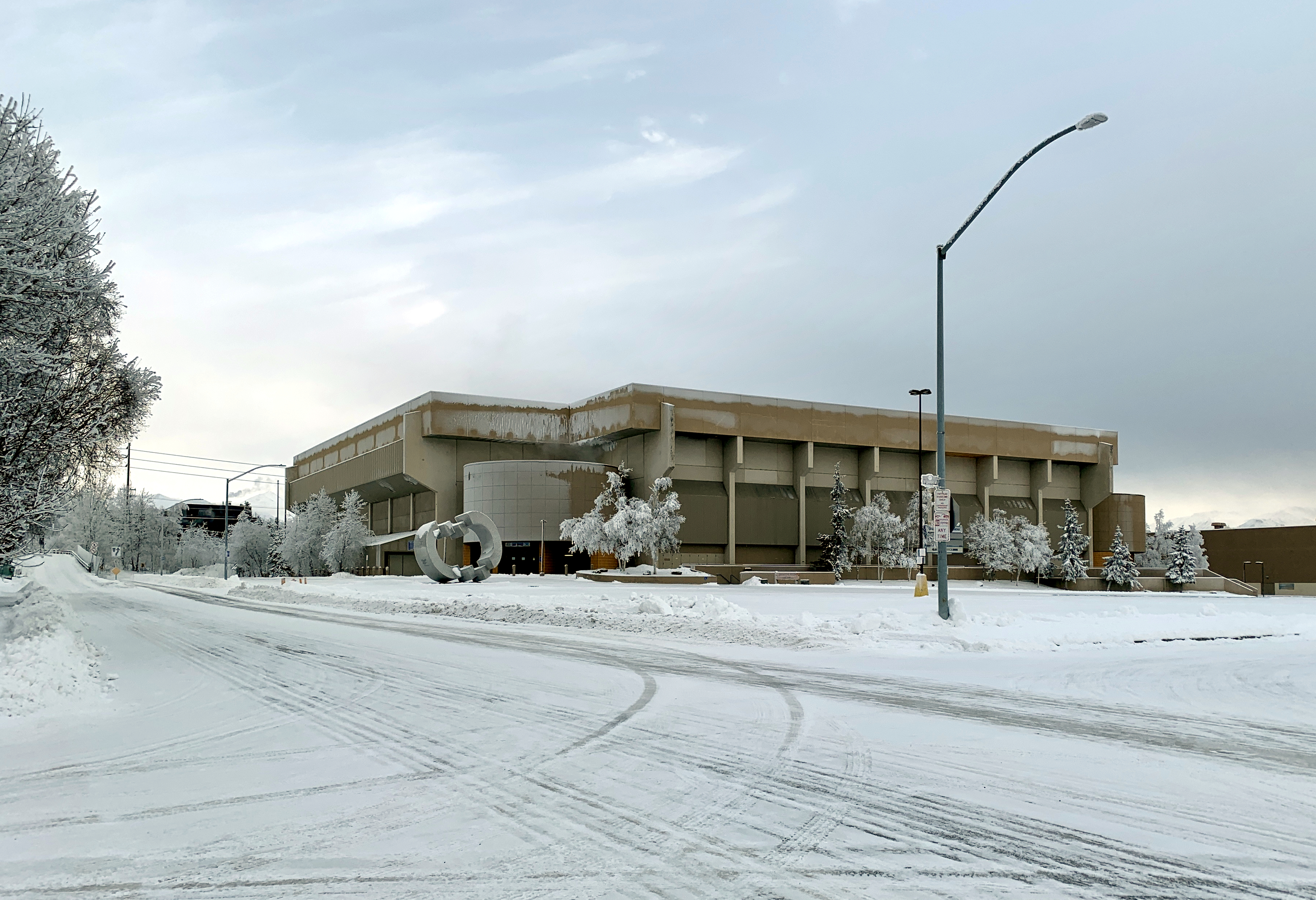
- Sullivan Arena (2020)

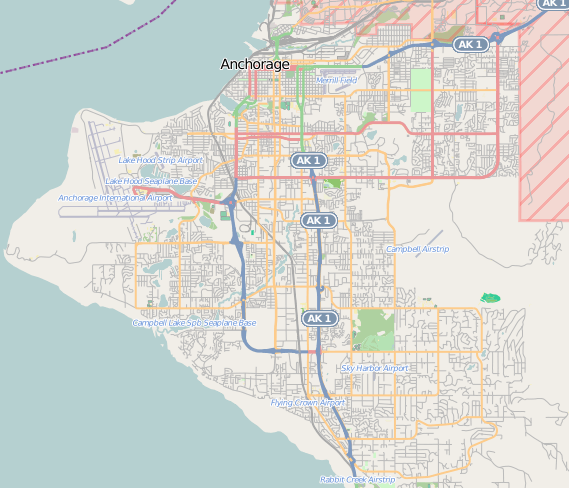
- Location within Anchorage Location within Alaska
- Full name: George M. Sullivan Arena
- Address: 1600 Gambell Street
- Location: Anchorage, Alaska
- Owner: Municipality of Anchorage
- Operator: All In 49
- Capacity: Ice Hockey: 6,290 (seated), 6,490 (with standing room); Basketball: 7,987; Concert: up to 8,751; Boxing/Wrestling: 8,935
- Surface: 200' x 100' (ice hockey)

Construction
- Groundbreaking: August 1981
- Opened: February 8, 1983
- Renovated: 2015
- Cost: $25 million ($80.8 million in 2025 dollars) $9.1 million (2015 renovations)
- Architects: The Luckman Partnership Inc. Harold Wirum & Associates
- Project managers: Hanscomb Heery, Inc.
- Services engineers: Skogland, Inc.
- General contractor: Kissee Contractors

Tenants
- Alaska Anchorage Seawolves (NCAA) (1983–2019); Alaska Aces (ECHL) (2003–2017); Alaska Wild (Intense/IFL) (2007–2010); Anchorage Wolverines (NAHL) (2024–present)

George M. Sullivan Arena (commonly shortened to "Sullivan Arena" and often referred to colloquially as "The Sullivan" or "The Sully") is a 6,290-seat arena in Anchorage, Alaska, United States. The arena is named after former Anchorage mayor George M. Sullivan. It is owned by the Municipality of Anchorage and operated by All in 49. The Sullivan Arena sits in the southwest region of Fairview, a neighborhood in Anchorage. The arena opened in 1983 and sits just east of Mulcahy Stadium as part of the Chester Creek Sports Complex. Sullivan Arena hosted the 1989 World Junior Ice Hockey Championships along with the Harry J. McDonald Memorial Center in Eagle River.

In ice hockey, it was the home of the professional Alaska Aces of the ECHL from 1995 to 2017 and the University of Alaska Anchorage Seawolves men's NCAA Division I team from 1983 to 2019. It hosted the Great Alaska Shootout basketball tournament, which relocated to the Alaska Airlines Center in 2014. From 2007 to 2010, it was home to the Alaska Wild of the Indoor Football League. In 2021, the junior Anchorage Wolverines of the North American Hockey League planned to use Sullivan Arena for home games starting in the 2021–22 season, assuming the arena reopened following its use as a homeless shelter during the COVID-19 pandemic.

The Sullivan Arena operated on and off as a homeless shelter since the pandemic began in 2020. In May 2023, the homeless shelter shut down, as Anchorage mayor Dave Bronson said it needed to return to hosting hockey games and concerts. When the homeless shelter at Sullivan shut down, homeless camps in Anchorage's parks and green areas exploded in size. Anchorage officials have no plans to provide another winter shelter. On July 9, 2024, the Wolverines confirmed that they would relocate from Ben Boeke Ice Arena to Sullivan Arena for the 2024-25 season.

For hockey, the Sullivan Arena offers 6,251 seats with a standing room capacity of 6,451. If areas designated for wheelchairs are included, the arena can seat 6,290, plus standing room, during hockey games. The arena is noted for having an international-dimension (Olympic-sized) ice rink (61 m × 30 m / 200 ft × 98.5 ft) instead of the NHL dimensions (200 ft × 85 ft / 61 m × 25.9 m) common among North American venues. The main arena floor contains 32,000 square feet of space.

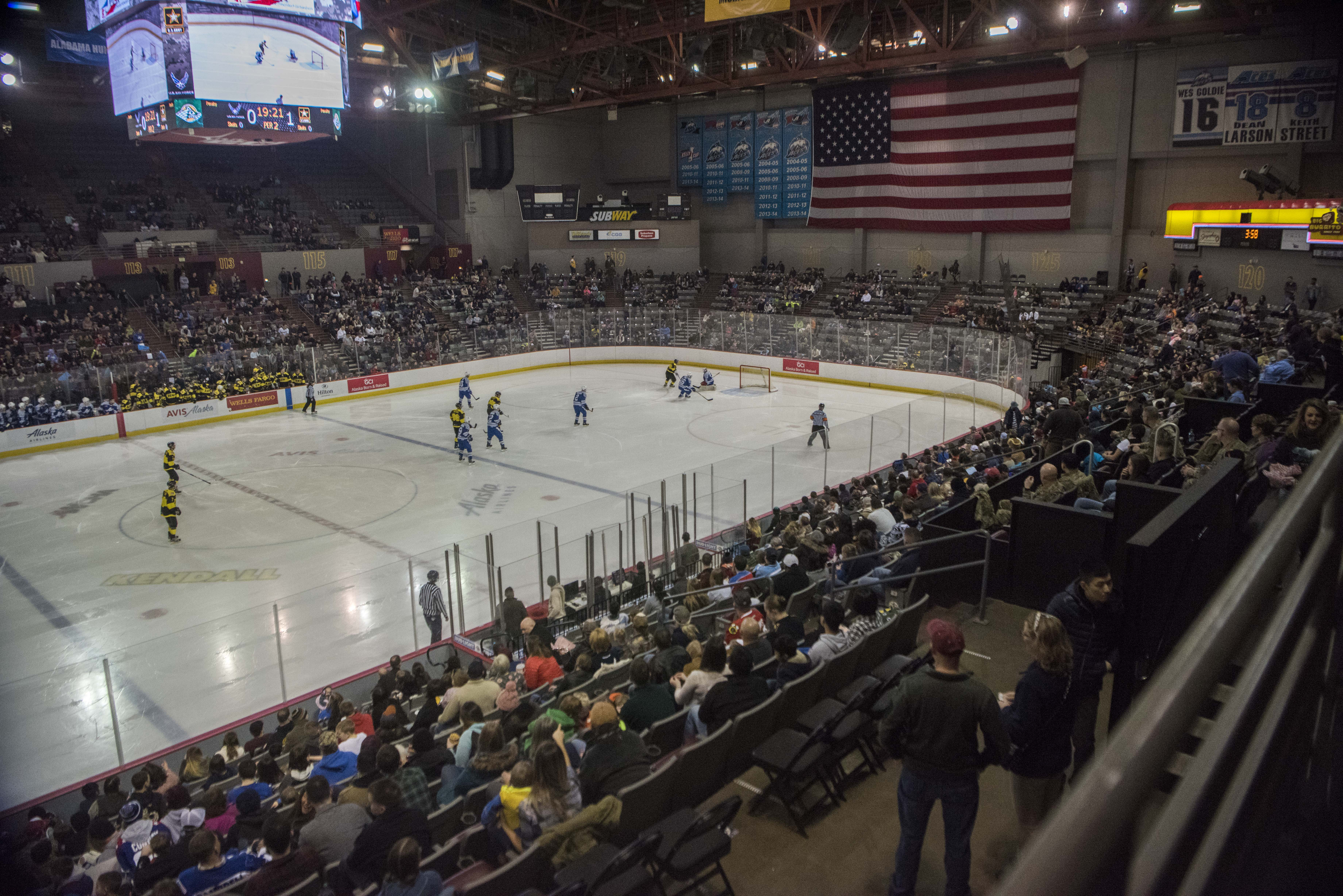
Arena interior in 2019

In 2014, a new center-hung scoreboard, with four 8-by-8-foot video screens and a wraparound LED display system was installed to replace the 80s-style scoreboard which had a black-and-white dot matrix display. The new scoreboard was previously installed at the Cow Palace in Daly City, California, where it was used by the ECHL affiliate of the San Jose Sharks, the San Francisco Bulls. The Bulls purchased the scoreboard for their first season in 2012 but the team folded less than two years later. The scoreboard is made by Colosseo, a European company specializing in stadium and arena LED and entertainment technology.

There were plans, projected for 2015, for the neighboring Mulcahy Stadium to be demolished and rebuilt to its west in order to create 400 new parking spaces for the arena. In addition, all seats and telescopic risers inside Sullivan Arena were replaced, the arena floor was rebuilt, and its ice-making equipment was upgraded for the 2015–16 hockey season. Another renovation in 2017 expanded the arena's storage space by 5,000 square feet, replaced the arena's portable stage, floor seating and artificial turf, and improved the arena's acoustics.

Musicians that have performed at the arena include The Beach Boys, Johnny Cash, Eric Clapton, Jimmy Buffett, Bon Jovi, Scorpions, Ozzy Osbourne, Steve Miller Band, Dr. Dre, Snoop Dogg, Coolio, Filter, Lonestar, Metallica, Aerosmith, Green Day, Stone Temple Pilots, No Doubt, Blink-182, James Brown, Elton John, Red Hot Chili Peppers, 36 Crazyfists, Sum 41, Chicago, and Luke Bryan.
