= Alaska Anchorage Seawolves =

Sports Teams of the University of Alaska Anchorage

- University: University of Alaska Anchorage
- Nickname: Seawolves
- NCAA: Division II (primary); Division I (gymnastics and hockey)
- Conference: GNAC (primary); MPSF (gymnastics); RMISA (skiing)
- Athletic director: Michael Bazemore
- Location: Anchorage, Alaska
- Varsity teams: 13 (5 men's, 6 women's, 1 co-ed)
- Basketball arena: Alaska Airlines Center
- Ice hockey arena: Avis Alaska Sports Complex
- Other venues: Alyeska Resort; Kincaid Park; The Dome
- Colors: Green and gold
- Mascot: Spirit
- Website: goseawolves.com
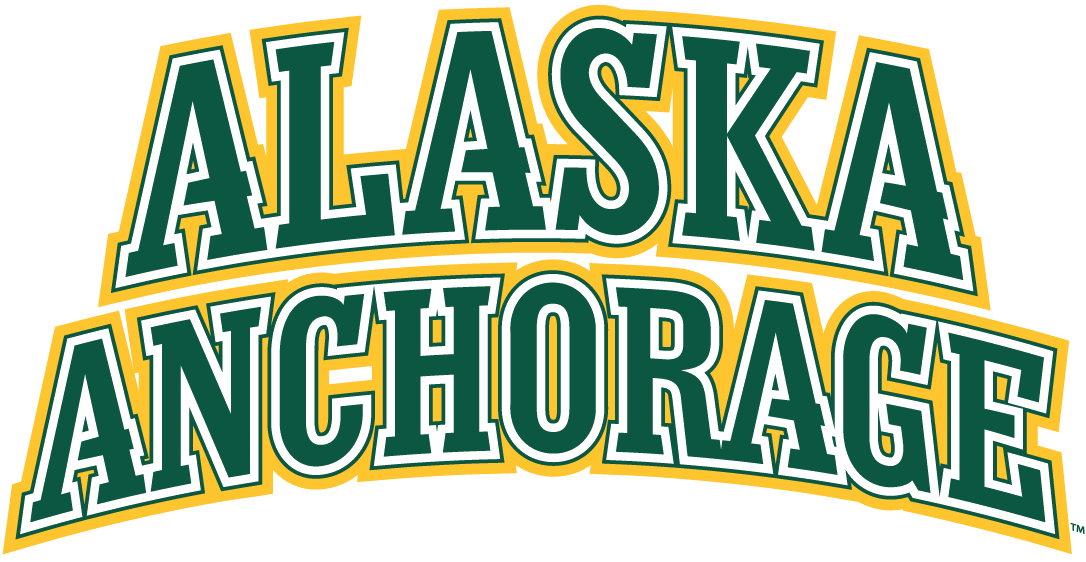

The Alaska Anchorage Seawolves are the 13 varsity athletic teams that represent the University of Alaska Anchorage (UAA), in Anchorage, Alaska, United States, in NCAA intercollegiate sports. The vast majority of UAA's athletic teams are in NCAA Division II, with the exception of the women's gymnastics and men's ice hockey teams, which are members of Division I.

The Seawolves principally compete as members of the Great Northwest Athletic Conference, fielding teams in women's volleyball, men's and women's basketball, men's and women's cross country, and men's and women's indoor and outdoor track & field. Teams playing outside the GNAC include the hockey team (independent, no conference affiliation), the gymnastics team (Mountain Pacific Sports Federation), and the ski teams (Rocky Mountain Intercollegiate Ski Association).

The nickname, Seawolves, is based on a Sea-Wolf, a mythical creature in Tlingit and Haida traditions.

== Sports sponsored ==
Men's sports	Women's sports
Basketball	Basketball
Cross country	Cross Country
Ice hockey	Gymnastics
Track and field^{†}	Track and field^{†}
	Volleyball
Co-ed sports
Skiing
† – Track and field includes both indoor and outdoor
